= Unidirectional Lightweight Encapsulation =

The Unidirectional Lightweight Encapsulation (ULE) is a data link layer protocol for the transportation of network layer packets over MPEG transport streams.

Because of the very low protocol overhead, it is especially suited for IP over Satellite services (where every bit counts). Such a system is for example DVB-S. However, ULE can also be used in the context of DVB-C and DVB-T, theoretically in every system which is based on MPEG transport streams (e.g., ATSC).

ULE has been engineered by the IP over DVB (ipdvb) working group of the Internet Engineering Task Force (IETF) and has been standardized in RFC 4326.

Another encapsulation method is Multiprotocol Encapsulation (MPE), which was developed and standardized by the DVB project.

== See also ==
- MPEG-2
- Generic Stream Encapsulation (GSE)
- Multiprotocol Encapsulation (MPE)
- Datacasting
- Internet Protocol Datacasting (IPDC) for DVB-H
- UDcast
- Interactive television

== Implementations ==
Software: Linux Kernel, ulenet for Windows XP,

The ipdvb Working Group maintains a list of ULE implementations.
