= IP over DVB =

Digital video networking

IP over DVB implies that Internet Protocol datagrams are distributed using some digital television system, for example DVB-H, DVB-SH, DVB-T, DVB-S, DVB-C or their successors like DVB-T2, DVB-S2, and DVB-C2. This may take the form of IP over MPEG, where the datagrams are transferred over the MPEG transport stream, or the datagrams may be carried in the DVB baseband frames directly, as in GSE.

== Application examples ==
- Data broadcast (datacast), for example a data carousel sending programme information and media over and over again.
- IP multicast, for sending media efficiently to a limited group of subscribing users, using only the transmitter towers where users for the moment are situated.
- interactive TV services
- To provide internet access by utilizing the DVB system as a broadband downlink, in combination with some narrow-band duplex system. Examples:
  - Satellite Internet access, e.g. to buildings in the countryside, using a telephone modem as the back-channel
  - Broadband Internet access to trains
  - Mobile broadband internet access to cellular phones including a mobile TV receiver, for example a DVB-H receiver.

== Return channels ==
All services except the first requires some kind of return channel.

- DVB-RCT (DVB Return Channel Terrestrial)
- DVB-RCS (DVB Return Channel via Satellite)
- Dial-up modems
- ADSL
- VDSL
- Cable modems
- Fiber to the x
- 2.5G
- 2.75G (also called E)
- 2.875G (also called E+)
- 3G
- 3G+ (also called H)
- HSPA+ (also called H+)
- 4G
- 4G+
- 5G

== Protocols for IP over DVB base band frames ==
- Generic Stream Encapsulation (GSE), ETSI TS 102 606: "Digital Video Broadcasting (DVB); Generic Stream Encapsulation (GSE) Protocol", European Telecommunications Standard Institute (ETSI)

== Protocols for IP over MPEG transport stream ==
- MPEG Multiprotocol encapsulation (MPE), or ETSI-DAT. EN 301 192, "Specifications for Data Broadcasting", European Telecommunications Standards Institute(ETSI), 2004.
- MPEG Unidirectional Lightweight Encapsulation (ULE) (RFC 4326)
- Unidirectional link (UDE)
- DVB-H IP datacasting IPDC

== DVB-IPTV ==
DVB-IPTV is an open DVB standard that enables Audio/Video services to be delivered to and through the home via Internet Protocol networking. DVB-IPTV was formerly known as DVB-IPI.

== See also ==
- DVB-MHP (Multimedia Home Platform)
