= Converter/descrambler =

Device that decodes a Cable TV signal

When a descrambler is added to the Cable Converter Box in the same chassis, it is referred to as a Converter/Descrambler or sometimes a Combination Unit, and is a type of Set-top box, it allows : local broadcast channels, basic cable channels, authorized premium channels, "Pay-Per-View" (PPV), and “Video On Demand” (VOD) services to be viewed. A Combination Converter/Descrambler is generally called a Set-top box or STB it is a single (one-piece) system installed in a single cabinet and represents a single component that is capable of descrambling premium services, like HBO or Showtime, pay-per-view cable channels., Video on Demand, Games or other specialty pay services, and transposes the cable signal for RF output on channel 3 or 4. This unit contains a converter and a descrambler, enclosed in a common box and outputs the signal directly to a TV, VCR, DVR, PC, DVD or video projector.

== See also ==
- Business Support Systems
- Operations Support System
- Cable television headend
- Set-top box
- Cable Converter Box
- Scrambler
- Descrambler
- encryption
- Provisioning (technology)
- conditional access system
- One-time pad
- Voice inversion
- Addressable Systems
- Addressability

Related Technologies:

- ATSC tuner
- Audio
- Cable modem
- Connectivity: RS-232, USB, Bluetooth and Wi-Fi
- Digital television adapter (DTA)
- DOCSIS
- DVB
- Free-to-air
- Integrated Services Digital Broadcasting
- Interactive television
- IPTV
- QAM tuner
- QPSK
- Satellite dish
- Symbol rate
