= GVT =

GVT may refer to:

- Gauge vector–tensor gravity in astrophysics
- German volume training, a form of weight training
- Global Village Telecom, a Brazilian telecommunications company
  - GVT TV, a Brazilian television channel
- Glyn Valley Tramway in Wales
- Graft-versus-tumor effect in transplantation medicine
- Grand Valley Trail, in Ontario, Canada
- Grand Valley Transit, a public transportation agency in Colorado
- Green Valley Township (disambiguation), various settlements in the United States
- Green View Tower, a skyscraper in Tijuana, Mexico
- Graphics Virtualization Technology, an Intel technology
- Gravity-vacuum transit, a proposed transportation system
- Group voting ticket, a voting system in Australia
- Majors Airport, serving Greenville, Texas
