= Satellite modem =

Type of modem

A satellite modem or satmodem is a modem used to transmit and receive digital information using a communications satellite. It converts digital data into a modulated radio-frequency signal for transmission and demodulates received signals to recover the transmitted data. In order to accomplish this over a long-distance satellite link, the modems often perform Forward Error Correction, framing, synchronization, and other signal processing functions.</ref>

Satellite modem are used in ground stations, network gateways, Very-small-aperture terminals, and satellite user terminals. They support a range of applications including broadband access, cellular backhaul, broadcasting, defense communications, and spacecraft Telemetry.

== Satellite link ==
Satellite modems employ a range of modulation schemes, including both Phase-shift keying, and Quadrature amplitude modulation, depending on the communication system and applicable waveform standard.

The DVB-S2 standard specifies QPSK, 8PSK, 16APSK, and 32APSK modulation, together with concatenated BCH code and Low-density parity-check code forward error correction. DVB-S2X further extends the range of supported modulation and coding configurations.

Some satellite systems employ Adaptive coding and modulation which automatically adjust modulation and coding parameters in response to changing link conditions to improve spectral efficiency and link availability.

== Features ==
The main functions of a satellite modem are modulation and demodulation. Satellite communication standards also define error correction codes and framing formats.

Popular modulation types being used for satellite communications:

- Binary phase-shift keying (BPSK);
- Quadrature phase-shift keying (QPSK);
- Offset quadrature phase-shift keying (OQPSK);
- 8PSK;
- Quadrature amplitude modulation (QAM), especially 16QAM.

The popular satellite error correction codes include:

- Convolutional codes:
  - with constraint length less than 10, usually decoded using a Viterbi algorithm (see Viterbi decoder);
  - with constraint length more than 10, usually decoded using a Fano algorithm (see Sequential decoder);
- Reed–Solomon codes usually concatenated with convolutional codes with an interleaving;
- New modems support superior error correction codes (turbo codes and LDPC codes).

Frame formats that are supported by various satellite modems include:

- Intelsat business service (IBS) framing
- Intermediate data rate (IDR) framing
- MPEG-2 transport framing (used in DVB)
- E1 and T1 framing

High-end modems also incorporate some additional features:

- Multiple data interfaces (like RS-232, RS-422, V.35, G.703, LVDS, Ethernet);
- Embedded Distant-end Monitor and Control (EDMAC), allowing to control the distant-end modem;
- Automatic Uplink Power Control (AUPC), that is, adjusting the output power to maintain a constant signal to noise ratio at the remote end;
- Drop and insert feature for a multiplexed stream, allowing to replace some channels in it.

== Internal structure ==
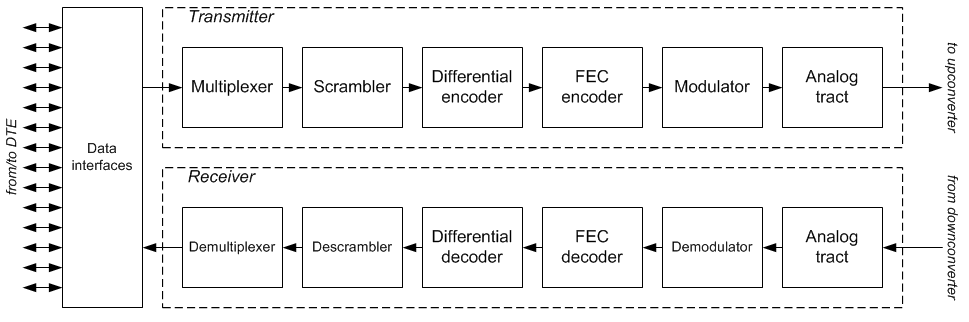
Satellite modem's internal structure

Probably the best way of understanding how a modem works is to look at its internal structure. A block diagram of a generic satellite modem is shown on the image.

=== Analog front end ===
After a digital-to-analog conversion in the transmitter, the signal passes through a reconstruction filter. Then, if needed, frequency conversion is performed.

The purpose of the analog front end in the receiver is to convert signal's frequency, to adjust its power via an automatic gain control circuit and to get its complex envelope components.

The input signal for the analog front end is at the intermediate frequency, sometimes, in the L band, in which case it must be converted to an IF. Then the signal is either sampled or processed by the four-quadrant multiplier which produces the complex envelope components (I, Q) through multiplying it by the heterodyne frequency (see superheterodyne receiver).

At last the signal passes through an anti-aliasing filter and is sampled or (digitized).

=== Modulator and demodulator ===
A digital modulator transforms a digital stream into a radio signal at the intermediate frequency (IF). A modulator is generally simpler than a demodulator because it doesn't have to recover symbol and carrier frequencies.

A demodulator is one of the most important parts of the receiver. The exact structure of the demodulator is defined by a modulation type. However, the fundamental concepts are similar. Moreover, it is possible to develop a demodulator that can process signals with different modulation types.

Digital demodulation implies that a symbol clock (and, in most cases, an intermediate frequency generator) at the receiving side has to be synchronous with those at the transmitting side. This is achieved by the following two circuits:

- timing recovery circuit, determining the borders of symbols;
- carrier recovery circuit, which determines the actual meaning of each symbol. There are modulation types (like frequency-shift keying) that can be demodulated without carrier recovery, however, this method, known as noncoherent demodulation, is generally worse.

There are also additional components in the demodulator such as the intersymbol interference equalizer.

If the analog signal was digitized without a four-quadrant multiplier, the complex envelope has to be calculated by a digital complex mixer.

Sometimes a digital automatic gain control circuit is implemented in the demodulator.

=== FEC coding ===
Error correction techniques are essential for satellite communications, because, due to satellite's limited power a signal-to-noise ratio at the receiver is usually rather poor. Error correction works by adding an artificial redundancy to a data stream at the transmitting side and using this redundancy to correct errors caused by noise and interference. This is performed by an FEC encoder. The encoder applies an error correction code to the digital stream, thereby adding redundancy.

An FEC decoder decodes the Forward error correction code used within the signal. For example, the Digital Video Broadcasting standard defines a concatenated code consisting of inner convolutional (standard NASA code, punctured, with rates $1/2$, $2/3$, $3/4$, $5/6$, $7/8$), interleaving and outer Reed–Solomon code (block length: 204 bytes, information block: 188 bytes, can correct up to 8 bytes in the block).

=== Differential coding ===
There are several modulation types (such as PSK and QAM) that have a phase ambiguity, that is, a carrier can be restored in different ways. Differential coding is used to resolve this ambiguity.

When differential coding is used, the data are deliberately made to depend not only on the current symbol, but also on the previous one.

=== Scrambling ===
Scrambling is a technique used to randomize a data stream to eliminate long '0'-only and '1'-only sequences and to assure energy dispersal. Long '0'-only and '1'-only sequences create difficulties for timing recovery circuit. Scramblers and descramblers are usually based on linear-feedback shift registers.

A scrambler randomizes the transmitted data stream. A descrambler restores the original stream from the scrambled one.

Scrambling shouldn't be confused with encryption, since it doesn't protect information from intruders.

=== Multiplexing ===
A multiplexer transforms several digital streams into one stream. This is often referred to as 'muxing.'

Generally, a demultiplexer is a device that transforms one multiplexed data stream into several. Satellite modems don't have many outputs, so a demultiplexer here performs a drop operation, allowing to the modem to choose channels that will be transferred to the output.

A demultiplexer achieves this goal by maintaining frame synchronization.

== Modem Cybersecurity ==
Satellite modems may be exposed to security vulnerabilities through their air interfaces, terrestrial network interfaces, and hardware or software implementations. These vulnerabilities have been exploited during events such as the Viasat hack.

== Applications ==
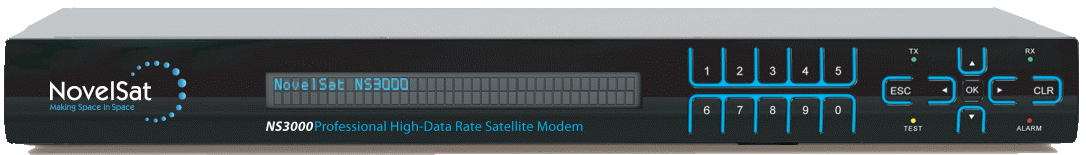
The NS3000 Satellite Modem modulates and demodulates data and video signals transmitted via satellite.

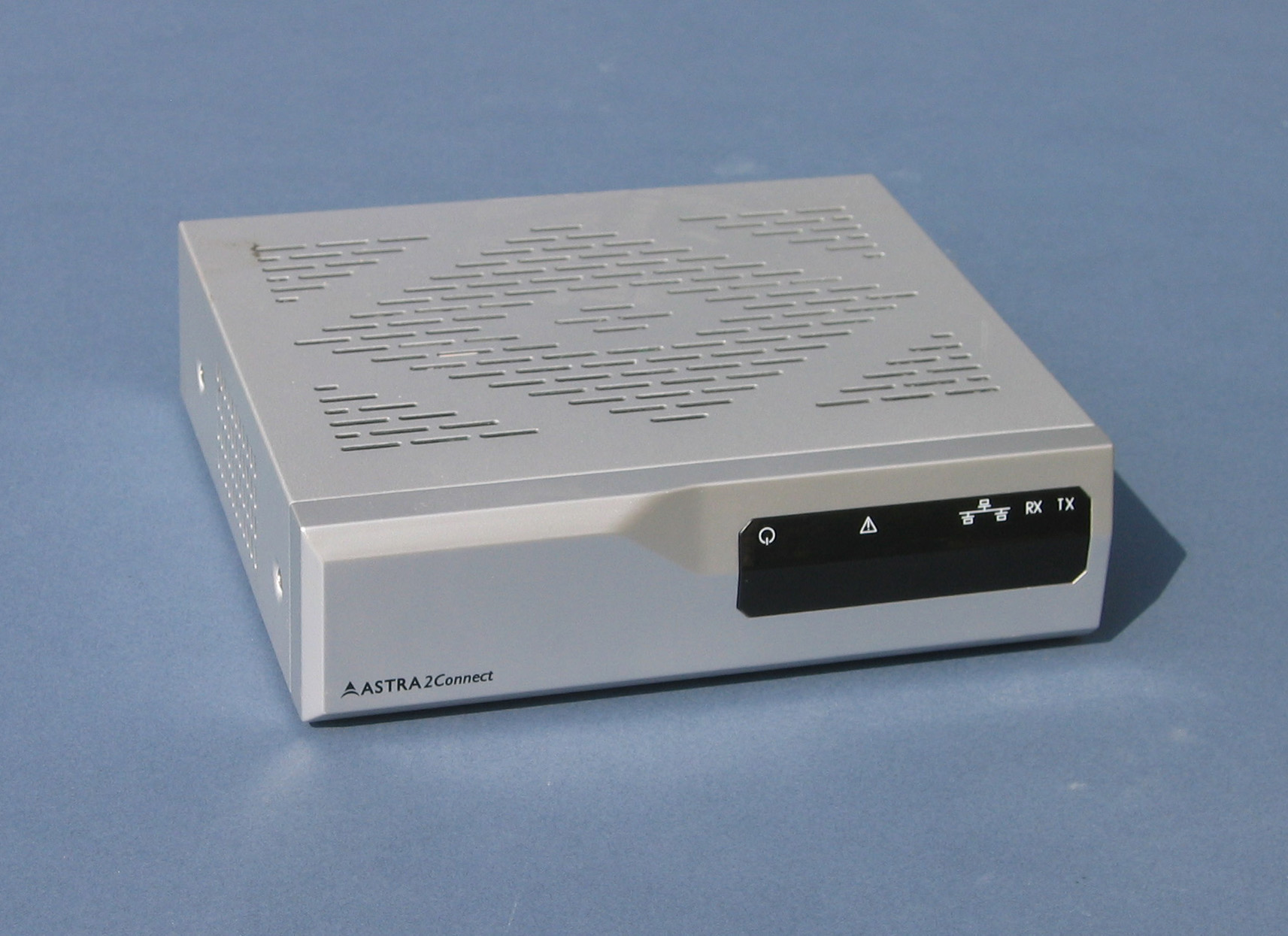
The "IP modem" (satellite modem) developed and made by Newtec of Belgium for SES' 2Mbit/s ASTRA2Connect European two-way satellite Internet system

Satellite modems are used in a variety of communications systems, including enterprise and consumer broadband, cellular backhaul, broadcast, maritime and aeronautical communications, and defense applications.

In two-way satellite broadband systems, terminals transmit and receive through a satellite link. Some networks leverage the DVB-RCS or DVB-RCS2 standards for return channels, while others employ proprietary waveforms. Satellite modems are use with both Geostationary orbit and non-Geostationary orbits (such as Medium Earth orbit, Low Earth orbit, and Highly elliptical orbit). Non-geo systems often require additional frequency tracking and Doppler effect compensation because of the relative motion between the satellites and the earth.

== See also ==
- Communications satellite
- Data collection satellite
- Yahsat
- Intelsat
- Viasat (American company)
- Satellite Internet access
- VSAT
