= DiBcom =

French fabless semiconductor company

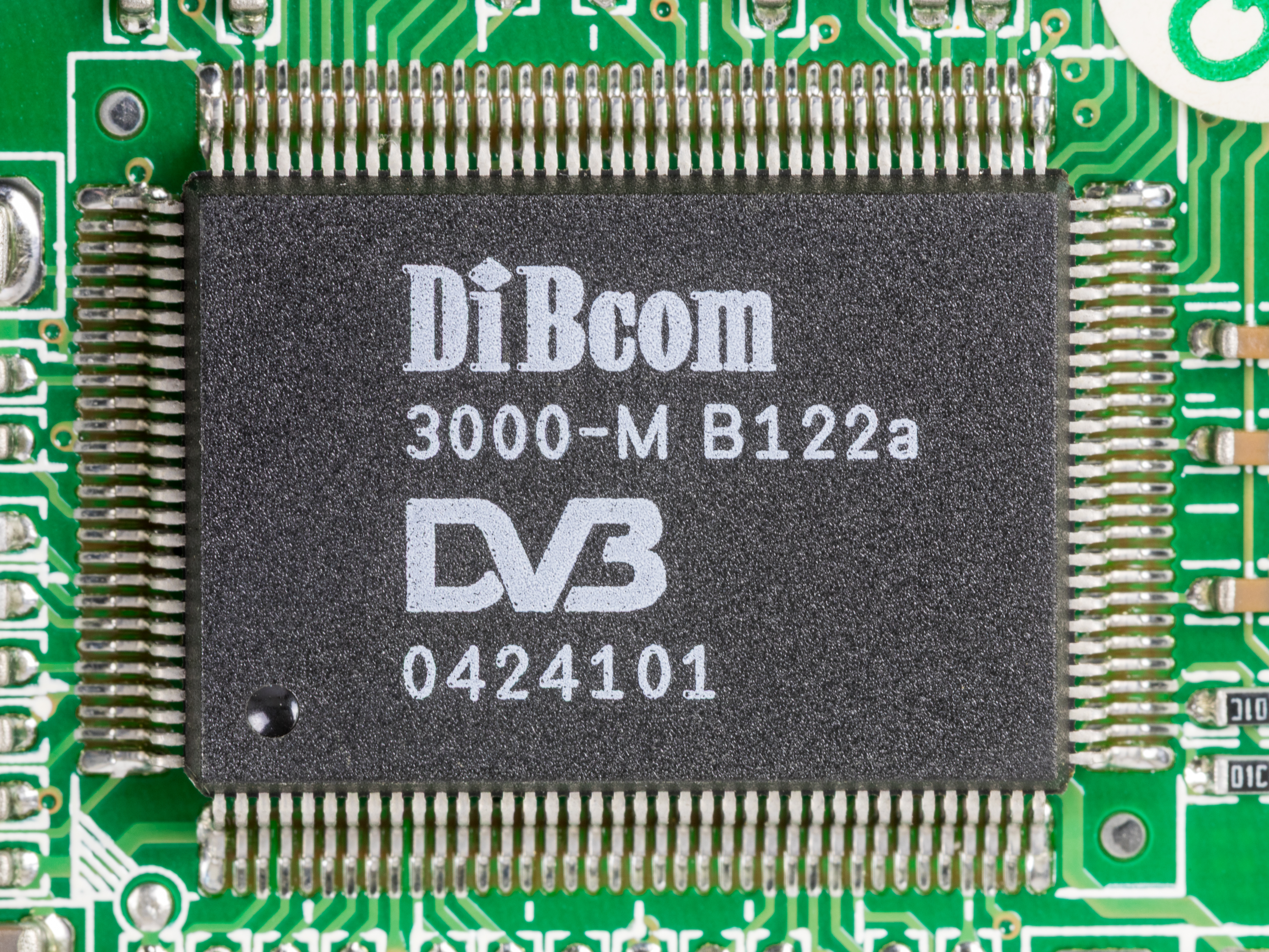
DiBcom 3000-M - Demodulator in a DVB-T-USB device

DiBcom was a French fabless semiconductor company that designs chipsets for low-power mobile TV and radio reception. Its chipsets are compliant with the current worldwide Digital Video Broadcasting standards DVB-T, DVB-T2, DVB-H, DVB-SH, with ATSC-M/H, ISDB-T (1seg and Full-SEG), CMMB and with DAB, DAB+, DMB in multistandard programmable platforms. It specializes in antenna diversity demodulator chipsets with a built-in tuner to minimize component count.

DiBcom has been acquired by Parrot SA in September 2011.
