= AUPC =

AUPC may refer to:

- Arellano University – Plaridel Campus (A.U.P.C.), a private university in the Philippine
- Automatic Uplink Power Control (AUPC), a feature of high-end satellite modems
