= Constellation shaping =

Energy efficiency enhancement method for digital signal modulation

Constellation shaping is an energy efficiency enhancement method for digital signal modulation that improves upon amplitude and phase-shift keying (APSK) and conventional quadrature amplitude modulation (QAM) by modifying the continuous uniform distribution of the data symbols to match the channel. In a channel corrupted by an additive white Gaussian noise (AWGN), this implies transmitting low-energy signals more frequently than high-energy signals with the target to approach a Gaussian distribution of the transmission power.

In digital signal modulation, information bits modulate the carrier electromagnetic wave signal to a set of desired phase, frequency and amplitude states. This set of allowed states is called a constellation. Typically, the probability of an information bit to be a 0 is the same as that of a 1, leading to all states from the constellation to appear with an equal probability. However, optimal transmission through most practical channels, like the AWGN, require a non-equal probability of the transmission symbols.

A shaped constellation transmission sends some signal combinations more often and others less frequently to optimize the signal quality at the destination, or to maintain the same quality using less transmission energy.

== Probabilistic constellation shaping ==
Probabilistic constellation shaping attempts to directly modify the Probability mass function by applying a distribution matcher between the user data and the mapper to constellation symbols. A practical transmitter and receiver architecture which achieves that was proposed in. This technique gathered more interest in September 2016 when Nokia Bell Labs demonstrated working 1 Tbit/s data transmission channels between German cities. In October 2016, Alcatel-Lucent and Bell Labs claimed to have achieved 65 Tbit/s transmission over a 6,600 km (4,100 mile) single mode fiber in laboratory trials. The industry's first commercial field trial was completed in 2018 by China Telecom and Huawei Technologies.

== Geometric constellation shaping ==
Geometric constellation shaping attempts to modify the distribution of transmission power by optimizing the constellation states themselves. In an AWGN channel, this typically implies gathering more constellation points around the area where the amplitude is small, and fewer points in the areas of high amplitude. Other types of channels require that high-amplitude points are clipped altogether, due to e.g. problems with amplifier efficiency. A notable examples are satellite links, where an APSK constellation is preferred to QAM.

The benefits of geometric constellation shaping is that no distribution matcher is required, which simplifies the digital signal processing at the transmitter and receiver. However, geometric constellation shaping does not typically allow Gray code labeling of the constellation points, leading to a performance degradation. Probabilistic shaping is thus slightly more effective than geometric shaping.
