= Addressability =

Digital ability for message responses

Addressability is the ability of a digital device to individually respond to a message sent to many similar devices. Examples include pagers, mobile phones and set-top boxes for pay TV. Computer networks are also addressable via the MAC address on Ethernet network cards, and similar networking protocols like Bluetooth. This allows data to be sent in cases where it is impractical (or impossible, such as with wireless devices) to control exactly where or to which devices the message is physically sent.

In the case of simple hardware devices like the pager, the address is simply the electronic serial number (and later IMEI/MEID) in its firmware, or physically manufactured into its circuitry. In the case of GSM mobile phones, it also includes the subscriber identity module, which is also present as a smart card on satellite TV receivers, or a different PCMCIA CableCARD for cable TV. Addressing and encryption are used together for conditional access to different TV channel bundles which a pay-TV customer has or has not paid for.

Addressing is also done in software at higher levels such as IP addresses, which can be dynamically allocated. Even physically separate devices are now addressable, such as to enforce revocation lists for digital restrictions, or to use the former DIVX DVD video rentals, although the latter only used its identity to "phone home" for billing purposes.

== Cable TV ==
Addressable systems or addressability for use in cable television communication systems are generally known. Addressability is typically regarded as the administration and control of addressable devices, known generically as provisioning or activation in the parlance of telecommunications industry, but specifically speaking to authorization of a particular service. Within the field of cable television or CATV, for example, an addressability system or addressable system may enable and control the distribution of cable services. The system creates a conditional access system (CAS), and allows the cable system to control and administer which cable products a customer may purchase and/or view.

A typical cable communications system includes several basic components such as a service provider, a cable television headend, business support systems (BSS), an operations support system (OSS), a controller and a customer's set-top box (STB), also known as a cable converter box, or simply a converter, or more correctly converter/descrambler. The set-top box is a key component in addressability systems as it is an integrated receiver/decoder (IRD). Normally, the headend receives a signal sent by a service provider, which may send the signal via an uplink (UL) to a satellite and a downlink (DL) from the satellite to the headend. At the headend, the signal may be manipulated by being scrambled, encrypted and having authorization codes attached thereto by a scrambler. The billing system or BSS typically manages products and services, customers and addressable equipment such as the converters and controllers. A customer's request for a certain service or product is normally forwarded to the BSS. The billing system or BSS sends instructions to the controller, which configures the converter in accordance with the instructions. The controller also communicates with the headend to receive the proper authorization information needed for the particular configuration. This information is sent to the converter. The converter also receives the signal and compares information on the signal to corresponding authorization from the controller. Based on the comparison, the customer's STB may or may not be able to descramble the signal and view the content or television program.

The addressability system may be viewed as the interface between the billing system or BSS/OSS and the controller. Known addressability systems receive information from the billing system and send it to the appropriate controller to enable the controller to properly configure the converter. A conventional addressability system may include an addressability server linked to the billing system. The addressability server receives information from the billing system and passes it to controller processors, which forward the information to the appropriate controller. Known systems are hardware driven and the packaging of enabling information is integrated with the billing system. The billing system gathers data corresponding to the customer and request, then packages the data into a format for a particular type of controller. Different types of controllers include controllers manufactured by General Instrument (GI), Motorola, Jerrold, Scientific Atlanta, Zenith, Tocom and Oak.

== See also ==
- Set-top box
- Cable converter
- Scrambler
- Provisioning (technology)
- conditional access system
- Voice inversion

=== Related technologies ===
- ATSC tuner
- Audio
- Cable modem
- Digital television adapter (DTA)
- DOCSIS
- DVB
- Free-to-air
- Interactive television
- IPTV
- QAM tuner
- QPSK
