= DVB-RCS =

Satellite return channel specification

DVB-RCS (Digital Video Broadcasting - Return Channel via Satellite) provides a method by which the DVB-S platform (and in theory also the DVB-S2 platform) can become a bi-directional, asymmetric data path using Wireless between broadcasters and customers. It is a specification for an interactive on-demand multimedia satellite communication system formulated in 1999 by the DVB consortium. Without this method, various degrees of interactivity can be offered, without implying any return channel back from the user to the service provider: Data Carrousel or Electronic Programs Guides (EPG) are examples of such enhanced TV services which make use of “local interactivity”, without any return path from customer to provider.

== Chronology ==
The 5th revision of the DVB-RCS standard was completed in 2008. A major update included the very first broadband mobile standardization. This extended version, formally referred to as "ETSI EN 301 790 v 1.5.1" is also known as "DVB-RCS+M". The "+M" version added several new features, such as the ability to use "DVB-S2" bursts in the uplink channel back to the satellite. It incorporated signal fade mitigation techniques and other solutions to combat short term signal loss.

In contrast to other satellite communications systems, DVB-RCS was created in an open environment where any DVB member can participate. DVB membership is open to all companies willing to subscribe. The work group called "DVB TM-RCS" is currently pursuing other technical solutions for the approved commercial system.

In 2009 technical work started for a new version of DVB-RCS called "DVB-RCS NG" (Next Generation). In this more powerful version of the standard "RCS2" there will be support for Higher Layers for Satellite (HLS) communication.

=== Evolution ===
In older systems, interactive video broadcasting was possible as a result of using physical cables for connectivity. However, in remote areas cable connections may be unavailable, two-way communication was then impossible via traditional means. One possible solution was to use a satellite linked connection for the return (uplink) channel in addition to the standard downlink channel. This option is more expensive to implement than with cabled connections in built-up areas, but may be more cost effective for remote areas where the costs of laying cable to users would not be recovered for a long time. Additional costs involved in RCS systems include the costs of a two-way satellite antenna and renting data bandwidth from a satellite communications provider.

=== Advantages ===
DVB-RCS is an open source satellite communication satellite with efficient bandwidth management, which makes it a cost-efficient alternative solution for many users. It also provides an established foundation for further satellite communications research.

=== Hardware implementation ===
To implement this kind of communication, a user will require a device called a SIT, (Satellite Interactive Terminal, "astromodem" or satellite modem). A suitable satellite-dish is also required. Some systems are supplied as a pre-built combination. The user receives multimedia stream transmissions via the downlink-signals from the satellite. The user sends requests for service signals via the "SIT" and the uplink channel to the satellite. Upon receipt of the command from the user the satellite sends the user request data to the service provider. This takes about 0.5 seconds to connect each way with the satellite. (1 second total for satellite up and downlinks, and another second to the service provider and back, a total of 2 seconds Round-trip delay time).

This technology can also be used for internet access via satellite. The downward route is from the service provider to the satellite, (via a standard uplink station), then via the downlink of the satellite to the users "SIT". Signal encoding uses phase-shift keying (QPSK or GMSK). The corresponding upward route is via the uplink-channel provided by the "SIT", data requests are transferred via the satellite to the service provider. The signal is then processed by a burst demodulator, (using the MF-TDMA protocol via the data scheduler). The data requested is then routed over the wired internet.

The protocol used for the satellite-SIT portion of the journey is Multiple Frequency Time Division Multiple Access (MF-TDMA). Using this protocol, the user receives data in packets (bursts) that may not be a continuous stream, but when stored and rearranged will generate a virtual 2-dimensional data array. A scheduler is used to maintain these bursts and eliminate duplicates. This protocol is implemented in such a way that different users will receive varying amounts of packet bursts, this helps to regulate the data stream from the satellite-link according to user demands.

=== Standards ===
The standard that implements DVB-RCS is ETSI EN 301.790.
