= Head end =

Head end may refer to:

- cable television headend, the central facility serving a local area for cable television systems
- SMATV headend, Single Master Antenna Television, receives and rebroadcasts satellite TV throughout a property

== See also ==
- Head-end power is the electrical power distribution system used in passenger trains
