= WIB =

WIB may refer to:

- Western Indonesian Time (Indonesian: Waktu Indonesia Barat)
- Workforce Investment Board, to promote workforce investment in US-associated places
- War Industries Board, US, World War I
- WiB (digital terrestrial television)
