= MSPP =

MSPP may refer to:

- The Microbee Software Preservation Project
- University of Maryland School of Public Policy
- Massachusetts School of Professional Psychology
- McCourt School of Public Policy at Georgetown University
- Multi-Service Provisioning Platform, see Add-drop multiplexer
- Microsoft PowerPoint
