= Randomizer =

Randomizer may refer to:

- Scrambler, a telecommunications device
- Video game randomizers
- Random number generator
