= Addressable =

Addressable may refer to an address.

Alternatively it could refer to one of the following:

- Addressability, the ability of a digital device to individually respond to a message sent to many similar devices
- Content-addressable memory, a special type of computer memory used in certain very-high-speed searching applications
- Total addressable market, used to reference the revenue opportunity available for a product or service
