= DVB-MS =

DVB-MS is a complementary system for digital television multi-point distribution based on the satellite delivery system DVB-S. For cable delivery system DVB-MC is used which is based on DVB-C.

The DVB-MS system uses microwave frequencies above > 10 GHz to directly distribute television services from a central point to homes of viewers. To receive the signal a small frequency converter is used instead of a satellite dish for DVB-S. DVB-MC uses frequencies below 10 GHz.
