= Multiprotocol Encapsulation =

Multiprotocol Encapsulation, or MPE for short, is a Data link layer protocol defined by DVB which has been published as part of ETSI EN 301 192. It provides means to carry packet oriented protocols (like for instance IP) on top of MPEG transport stream (TS).

Another encapsulation method is Unidirectional Lightweight Encapsulation (ULE) which was developed and standardized within the IETF as RFC 4326.

== Protocol Outline ==
MPE uses MPEG-2 Private Table sections to carry the user datagrams. The section header is used to convey:

- the frame's destination MAC address
- optional ISO/IEC 8802-2 Logical Link Control (LLC) and ISO/IEC 8802-1 Sub-Network Attachment Point (SNAP) information
- a payload scrambling indication
- a MAC address scrambling indication

MAC addresses from 1 to 6 bytes length may be used. The format of MPEG-2 DSM-CC sections happens to be compatible with DVB MPE.

== MPE-based IP Service Offerings ==
=== Service Architecture ===
A complete IP service offering over MPEG-2 TS can be established by organizing MPE streams into one or more IP Platforms carried on a broadcast network by means of the IP/MAC Notification Table mechanism which is also defined in ETSI EN 301 192.

=== Commercial Offerings ===
Both major European satellite operators (SES and Eutelsat) are offering commercial IP services using MPE (such as ASTRA2Connect) to both businesses and consumers.

== See also ==
- IP over DVB
- ASTRA2Connect
