= DVB-SH =

Digital TV standard that allows satellite TV to be watched on a cellphone

DVB-SH ("Digital Video Broadcasting - Satellite services to Handhelds") is a physical layer standard for delivering IP based media content and data to handheld terminals such as mobile phones or PDAs, based on a hybrid satellite/terrestrial downlink and for example a GPRS uplink. The DVB Project published the DVB-SH standard in February 2007.

The DVB-SH system was designed for frequencies below 3 GHz, supporting UHF band, L Band or S-band. It complements and improves the existing DVB-H physical layer standard. Like its sister specification (DVB-H), it is based on DVB IP Datacast (IPDC) delivery, electronic service guides and service purchase and protection standards.

In late 2016, it was acknowledged within the DVB Project newsletter that DVB-SH and the related DVB-H standard had been a commercial failure.

== Standard description ==
=== Architecture ===
There are two physical layers (terrestrial and satellite), what increases de system configuration options. Depending on the transmitted signal modulation we can find two kind of architectures: SH-A and SH-B.

==== SH-A Architecture ====
Both terrestrial and satellite layers use Orthogonal frequency-division multiplexing (OFDM) this modulation solves the multipath problem, where the same token can be received multiple times with a delay due to bounces. Use OFDM in both transmitters enables creating single-frequency networks (SFN), that increases spectral efficiency but forces the terrestrial signal being identical to the transmitted by the satellite. For this reason, is permitted to implement Multi-frequency network (MFN) where terrestrial and satellite components can broadcast through different channels with the same modulation.

==== SH-B Architecture ====
Terrestrial component uses OFDM but satellite uses Time-division multiplexing (TDM). Both components have to broadcast in different frequencies to avoid interference. It is not possible creating SFN but increases satellite's signal transmission performance because TDM works better with these kinds of transmissions.

== Comparison with DVB-H ==
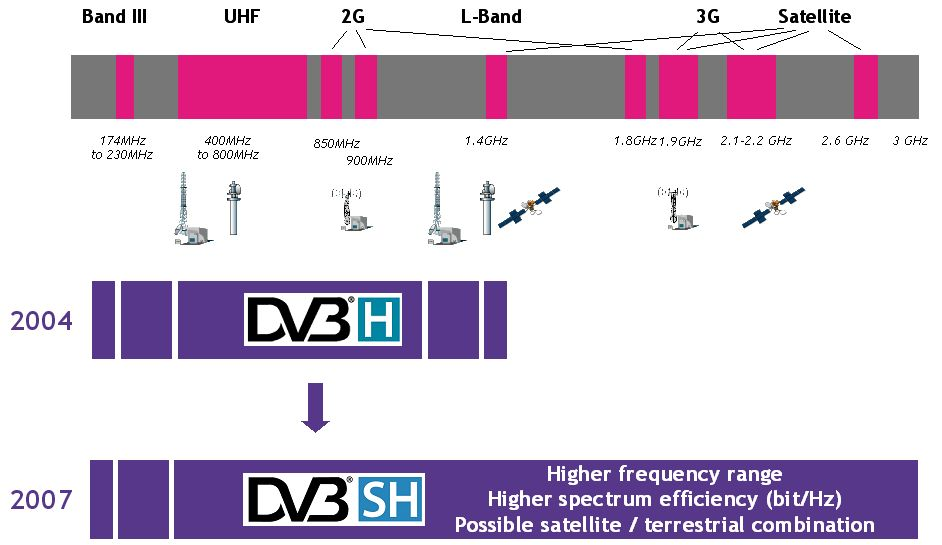
DVB-SH supported spectrum

The DVB-SH incorporates a number of enhancements when compared to DVB-H:

- More alternative coding rates are available
- The omission of the 64QAM modulation scheme
- The inclusion of support for 1.7 MHz bandwidth and 1k FFT
- FEC using Turbo coding
- Improved time interleaving
- Support for antenna diversity in terminals

Recently, results from BMCO forum (Alcatel April 2008) shows a radio improvement of at least 5.5 dB on signal requirements between DVB-H and DVB-SH in the UHF frequencies. The improvements to signal requirements translates to better in-building penetration, better in-car coverage and extension of outdoor coverage. DVB-SH chipsets are being developed now by DiBcom and NXP Semiconductors, and are expected to be available in beginning of 2008. Initial specifications show that the chipsets supports both UHF and S-Band and are compatible with DVB-H.

DiBcom has announced a DVB-SH chip with availability in 2008 Q3. Dibcom DVB-SH 2008 Q3. The chip "has dual RF tuners supporting VHF, UHF, L-Band and S-Band frequencies".

== Project organization ==
French Agence de l'innovation industrielle is now financing this effort through TVMSL, a project led by Alcatel-Lucent that plans to develop a DVB-SH standard suitable for hybrid satellite and terrestrial transmission. Other partners involved in TVMSL are Sagem Wireless, Alenia, RFS, Philips, DiBcom, TeamCast, UDcast, CNRS, INRIA, CEA-LETI.

== Satellites ==
ICO, one of the biggest satellite operators in the United States, in 2007 announced a nationwide deployment of an hybrid satellite/terrestrial network in DVB-SH with Alcatel-Lucent and Expway. ICO G1 satellite carrying DVB-SH technology on board was launched on April 14, 2008. It is the world's first DVB-SH satellite in orbit.

Eutelsat W2A satellite carrying a Solaris Mobile (a Eutelsat and SES joint venture, now EchoStar Mobile) DVB-SH S band payload was launched on 3 April 2009. It will cover Western Europe. S-band payload was scheduled to enter into service in May 2009 but this did not occur due to an anomaly currently being investigated. On 1 July 2009, Solaris Mobile filed the insurance claim. The technical findings indicate that the company should be able to offer some, but not all of the services it was planning to offer.

Inmarsat's S band satellite programme, called EuropaSat, will deliver mobile multimedia broadcast, mobile two-way broadband telecommunications and next-generation MSS services across all member states of the European Union and as far east as Moscow and Ankara by means of a hybrid satellite/terrestrial network. It will be built by Thales Alenia Space and launched in early 2011 by ILS.

== Trials ==
As of February 2008, DVB-H/SH trials were- or had recently been- underway in many cities and countries: Ireland, United Kingdom, Malaysia, Singapore, Helsinki, Berlin, Cambridge, Pittsburgh, Paris, Tehran, Madrid, Sydney, South Africa, Taiwan, The Hague, Brussels, Bern, Vienna, New Zealand, Philippines, Copenhagen, Budapest, Erlangen, Sri Lanka, Roeselare, and India.

DVB-SH in S-band is seen as an alternative in Europe. Field trials and studies showed better performance in radio than DVB-H standard that would lead to much lower costs for network deployments.

In France again, SFR and Alcatel-Lucent teamed up to deploy a DVB-SH trial. The results confirmed the theoretical assumptions on the superiority of the DVB-SH over DVB-H, being the natural evolution of this legacy technology.

In Italy, 3 Italia, RAI and Alcatel-Lucent joined forces for the first DVB-SH trial in Italy.

In United States, Dish Network and Alcatel-Lucent joined forces for the first DVB-SH trial in US.

== See also ==
- Electronic program guide
- E-VSB ATSC standard
- Handheld projector
- IP over DVB
- DVB over IP
- MediaFLO
- Mobile DTV Alliance industry association
- Mobile TV a term for the entire category
- Multimedia Broadcast Multicast Service (MBMS)
- OFDM system comparison table
- Spectral efficiency comparison table
- WiMAX
