= Telecine (disambiguation) =

- Telecine, is transferring motion picture film into video and is performed in a color suite.
- Rede Telecine, are six premium television channels in Brazil, jointly owned by Globosat and formerly partially owned by 20th Century Fox, Paramount Pictures, Universal Pictures, MGM and previously DreamWorks.
