= UDcast =

- Type: Private
- Industry: Telecommunications
- Founded: 2000
- Headquarters: Sophia Antipolis
- Products: Networking equipment
- Website: www.udcast.com

UDcast was a company that provided products for Internet Protocol (IP) over broadcast media. It developed technology for IP networks over satellite and servers to provide television on mobile networks.

== History ==
UDcast was involved in international standards organisations such as ETSI and the Internet Engineering Task Force. UDcast was founded in June 2000 by members of the INRIA research center who had helped develop Unidirectional Link Routing (the UD stands for unidirectional, and the cast for broadcast). The mechanism was published in 2001 as number 3077 in the Request for Comments series. Founders included Antoine Clerget, Patrick Cipière, Emmanuel Duros, and Luc Ottavj. From at least 2003 through 2007, Hubert Zimmermann Was chief executive officer.

UDcast marketed wide-area network optimization appliances optimized for satellite infrastructures, with optimizations targeted at some specific satellite markets. They used acronyms such as DVB-H, DVB-SH, ATSC and WiMAX.

On 3 February 2011 OneAccess Networks announced they completed the acquisition of UDCast.
