= Reti Radiotelevisive Digitali =

RRD Reti Radiotelevisive Digitali S.p.A.
- Company type: Private
- Industry: Telecommunications
- Founded: 2004
- Headquarters: Milan, Italy
- Products: Broadcast equipment, Consulting, System Integration
- Website: www.rrd.tv

Reti Radiotelevisive Digitali (also known as RRD) is an Italian broadcasting, consulting and system integration company, and is the first company to implement and launch a commercial service on the DVB-H Handheld TV for 3G Mobile Operator 3 Italy. The group was established in 2004 by Teletext Italia and started working on DVB-H standard in 2005, at that time not yet fully standardized.

The 3 Italy DVB-H service was launched commercially in May 2006. Reti Radiotelevisive Digitali was in charge for site acquisition, analog site conversion, head-end development and operation for 3G Mobile Operator 3 Italy. On Q4 2006 RRD develop and deploy Hiwire Head-End in SES Americom premises for Las Vegas Hiwire Trial.
