= Mobile DTV Alliance =

American marketing organization

The Mobile DTV Alliance is a marketing organization based in San Ramon, California that was founded in 2006 by a consortium of companies to promote open standards for mobile TV. Its goal is the rapid adoption of mobile TV technology via DVB-H and to further the mobile TV experience in North America.

The President of the Mobile DTV Alliance, Yoram Solomon, is also on the boards of the WiMedia Alliance and Wi-Fi Alliance.

The Alliance was founded by Intel, Microsoft, Modeo, Motorola, Nokia and Texas Instruments.
