= German volume training =

Form of weight training

German Volume Training (GVT), commonly referred to as the "10x10 workout", is a form of weight training. It employs high set counts and moderate repetitions. GVT workouts typically involve 10 sets of 10 repetitions focused on a specific muscle group.

== Muscle building ==
GVT training programs emphasize different muscle groups each day in order to work the targeted muscle groups close to their breaking points, causing the body to build muscle mass quickly. GVT is a mainstream bodybuilding program and can be done at a frequency suitable to the trainee.

Guidelines ensure trainer safety - rest is important between sets, and should last between 60 and 90 seconds. During the set the lifter must also consider the amount of weight. For any given exercise, only about 60% of the lifter's one rep max should be used. For example, if a lifter's maximum bench press amount is 100 pounds (45 kg) then they should only lift 60 pounds (27 kg) for each rep. Another important consideration when using this type of training program is recovery time.

Most training programs involve daily training, whereas GVT recommends 5 days of workouts each week. Since each day a different muscle group is targeted and worked to near exhaustion, the soreness of that muscle may feel more intense and recovery may take longer than normal. On the 6th day, the regimen starts over, giving the lifter 2 days off for muscle recovery. The GVT program typically helps put on mass, and does not necessarily help improve the lifter's one rep max.

German volume training could also involve a set of muscles targeted in a day. For example, in one day, lifter can train his back and legs. Usually complimentary muscle groups are chosen to reduce the strain on muscles.
