= Green Valley Township =

Green Valley Township may refer to:

- Green Valley Township, Becker County, Minnesota
- Green Valley Township, Holt County, Nebraska
- Green Valley Township, Miner County, South Dakota, in Miner County, South Dakota
- Green Valley Township, Solano County, California
