= Add-drop multiplexer =

Manipulates DWDM channel contents

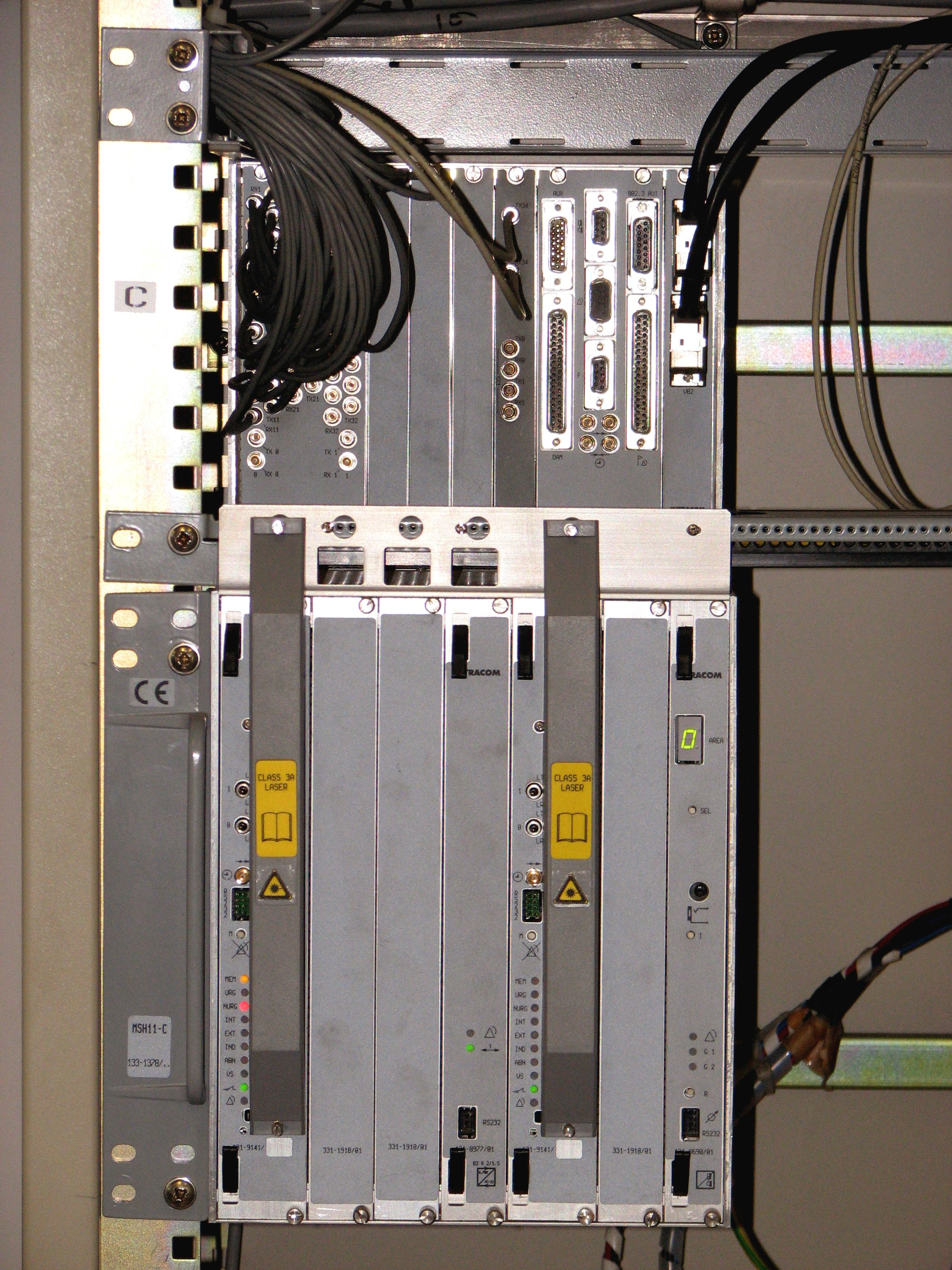
An add-drop multiplexer.

An add-drop multiplexer (ADM) is an important element of an optical fiber network. A multiplexer combines, or multiplexes, several lower-bandwidth streams of data into a single beam of light. An add-drop multiplexer also has the capability to add one or more lower-bandwidth signals to an existing high-bandwidth data stream, and at the same time can extract or drop other low-bandwidth signals, removing them from the stream and redirecting them to some other network path. This is used as a local "on-ramp" and "off-ramp" to the high-speed network.

ADMs can be used both in long-haul core networks and in shorter-distance metro networks, although the former are much more expensive due to the difficulty of scaling the technology to the high data rates and dense wavelength division multiplexing (DWDM) used for long-haul communications. The main optical filtering technology used in add-drop multiplexers is the Fabry–Pérot etalon.

Newer "multi-service SONET/SDH" (also known as a multi-service provisioning platform or MSPP) equipment has all the capabilities of legacy ADMs, but can also include cross-connect functionality to manage multiple fiber rings in a single chassis. These devices can replace multiple legacy ADMs and also allow connections directly from Ethernet LANs to a service provider's optical backbone. At the end of 2003, sales of multiservice ADMs exceeded those of legacy ADMs for the first time, as the change to next-generation SONET/SDH networks accelerated.

An emerging variety of ADMs that is becoming popular as the carriers continue to invest in metro optical networks are reconfigurable optical add-drop multiplexers (ROADMs).

== See also ==
- Optical add-drop multiplexer
- Drop and insert
