= Amplitude and phase-shift keying =

Digital modulation scheme

Amplitude and phase-shift keying (APSK) is a digital modulation scheme that conveys data by modulating both the amplitude and the phase of a carrier wave. In other words, it combines both amplitude-shift keying (ASK) and phase-shift keying (PSK). This allows for a lower bit error rate for a given modulation order and signal-to-noise ratio, at the cost of increased complexity, compared to ASK or PSK alone.

Quadrature amplitude modulation (QAM) can be considered a subset of APSK because all QAM schemes modulate both the amplitude and phase of the carrier. Conventionally, QAM constellations are rectangular and APSK constellations are circular, however this is not always the case. The distinction between the two is in their production; QAM is produced from two orthogonal signals. The advantage of APSK over conventional QAM is a lower number of possible amplitude levels and therefore a lower peak-to-average power ratio (PAPR). The resilience of APSK to amplifier and channel non-linearities afforded by its low PAPR have made it especially attractive for satellite communications, including DVB-S2.

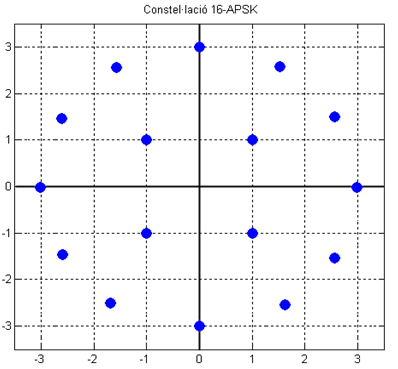
A modified constellation diagram of 16-APSK. Typically 16-APSK will have 15 degree phase offset on the outer ring, which is not depicted here. Symbols can be easily distinguished from each other and, moreover, varying of the space between rings is a way to counteract transmission distortions.

== Constellations ==
There are many APSK constellations. Circular constellations are the most common. There may be multiple circular constellations of the same order, for example 16-APSK could be implemented using a (1, 5, 10) constellation or a (5, 11) constellation. Increasing the number of rings decreases the bit error rate but increases the PAPR. Other APSK constellations include triangular, rectangular and hexagonal constellations.

A careful design of the constellation geometry can approach the Gaussian capacity as the constellation size grows to infinity. For the regular QAM constellations, a gap of 1.56 dB is observed. The previous solution, where the constellation has a Gaussian shape, is called constellation shaping.
