= WiB (digital terrestrial television) =

Frequency spectrum reuse technology

Teracom, inspired by earlier research, introduced a new system concept dubbed "WiB", that aims to improve frequency reuse in the UHF band while at the same time, enable savings in both operating power and capital expenditure.

Simulation results hint at an attainable spectral efficiency of at least 1.37–1.6 bit/s/Hz and a capacity increase in the range of 37–60%, while outlining possibilities for further optimizations.

However, the concept hints at possible methods of convergence and coexistence with future 5G mobile communication technologies, although this was not the main focus of the proposal.

== Innovation to broadcast towers ==
- Each tower should transmit the whole 224 MHz of DTT spectrum, eliminating channel combiners.
- A much lower transmission power is used (about 90% less)
- Modulation is more robust (e.g., QPSK)
- Relaxed equipment requirements.
- Synchronization similar to SFN, but with different content and orthogonal scattered pilots.

== Expected enhancements to receivers ==
- Frequency-hopping spread spectrum (e.g., Time-Frequency Slicing).
- Ability to tune to wider channels (e.g., 32 MHz instead of 8 MHz).
- Antenna discrimination considerations.
- Layered successive interference cancellation (SIC), performance could be further improved when optimizing for QPSK vs. QPSK.
- Variable bit rate services via multiple Physical Layer Pipes (PLP).
- Optional interference cancellation via beamforming.
