= GVT TV =

Direct broadcast satellite company

- Industry: Telecommunication
- Founded: September 16, 2011
- Defunct: April 15, 2016
- Successor: Vivo TV
- Headquarters: Curitiba, Brazil
- Products: Direct broadcast satellite
- Owner: Telefônica Vivo
- Parent: GVT
- Website: gvtinternet.com.br

GVT TV was a Brazilian pay television via satellite operator and a subsidiary of Global Village Telecom (GVT), which transmitted its signal via a DTH (direct to home) system for the K_{u} band. On September 16, 2011, the beta version was launched. GVT TV was created with the intention to fight for satellite TV leadership with big Brazilian operators such as Sky Brazil and Via Embratel, which use the same satellite television technology.

It was shut down in 2016 when GVT's parent company, Telefónica, retired the GVT brand in place of the Vivo brand.
