= DVB-S2 =

Digital satellite television standard

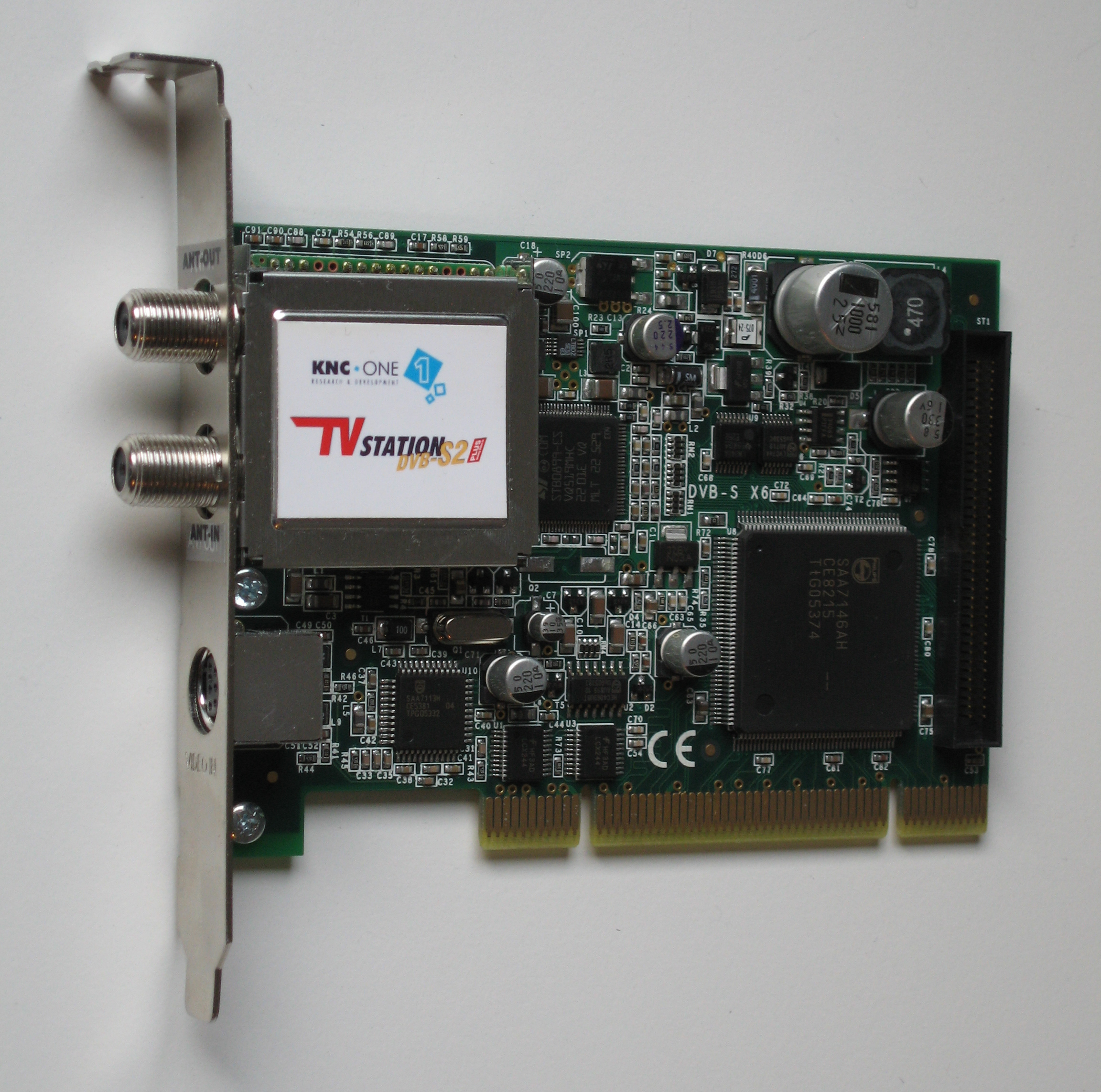
DVB-S2 PCI tuner card

Digital Video Broadcasting - Satellite - Second Generation (DVB-S2) is a digital satellite transmission standard developed by the Digital Video Broadcast project as the successor for the DVB-S system. It was ratified by ETSI (EN 302307) in March 2005. The standard is based on DVB-S and the electronic news-gathering (or Digital Satellite News Gathering) system, used by mobile units for sending sounds and images from remote locations worldwide back to their home television stations.

DVB-S2 is designed to support a broad range of applications including: broadcast services (standard and HDTV), interactive services including Internet access, and (professional) data content distribution). The development of DVB-S2 coincided with the introduction of HDTV and H.264 (MPEG-4 AVC) video codecs, which are both supported in DVB-S2x, allowing transmission of broadcast content and other digital data.

Two new key features that were added compared to the DVB-S standard are:

- A powerful coding scheme based on a modern LDPC code. For low encoding complexity, the LDPC codes chosen have a special structure, also known as Irregular Repeat-Accumulate codes.
- VCM (Variable Coding and Modulation) and ACM (Adaptive Coding and Modulation) modes, which allow optimizing bandwidth utilization by dynamically changing transmission parameters.

Other features include enhanced modulation schemes up to 32APSK, additional code rates, and the introduction of a generic transport mechanism for IP packet data including MPEG-4 audio–video streams, while supporting backward compatibility with existing MPEG-2 TS based transmission.

DVB-S2 achieves significantly better performance than its predecessors – mainly allowing for an increase of available bitrate over the same satellite transponder bandwidth. The measured DVB-S2 performance gain over DVB-S is around 30% at the same satellite transponder bandwidth and emitted signal power. When the contribution of improvements in video compression is added, an (MPEG-4 AVC) HDTV service can now be delivered in the same bandwidth that supported an early DVB-S based MPEG-2 SDTV service only a decade before.

In March 2014, DVB-S2X specification has been published by DVB Project as an optional extension adding further improvements.

== Main features ==
- Direct input of one or more MPEG-2 Transport Streams (TS). MPEG-TS is supported using a compatibility mode.
- The native stream format for DVB-S2 is called Generic Stream (GS), and can be used to efficiently carry IP-based data, including MPEG-4 AVC/H.264 services.
- Backward compatibility to DVB-S, intended for end users, and DVB-DSNG, used for backhauls and electronic news gathering.
- Variable coding and modulation (VCM) to optimize bandwidth utilization based on the priority of the input data; e.g., SDTV could be delivered using a more robust setting than the corresponding HDTV service.
- Adaptive coding and modulation (ACM) to allow flexibly adapting transmission parameters to the reception conditions of terminals, e.g., switching to a lower code rate during fading.
- Four modulation modes:
  - QPSK and 8PSK are proposed for broadcast applications, and can be used in non-linear transponders driven near to saturation.
  - 16APSK and 32APSK are used mainly for professional, semi-linear applications, but can also be used for broadcasting though they require a higher level of available C/N and an adoption of advanced pre-distortion methods in the uplink station in order to minimize the effect of transponder nonlinearity.
- Improved rolloff: α = 0.20 and α = 0.25 in addition to the roll-off of DVB-S α = 0.35 (though DVB-S can still benefit from improved roll off without breaking compatibility with existing DVB-S receivers).
- Improved coding: a modern large LDPC code is concatenated with an outer BCH code to achieve quasi-error-free (QEF) reception conditions on an AWGN channel. The outer code is introduced to avoid error floors at low bit-error rates. A single forward error correction or FEC frame may have either 64,800 bits (normal) or 16,200 bits (short). If VCM or ACM is used, the broadcast can be a combination of normal and short frames.
- Several code rates for flexible configuration of transmission parameters: 1/4, 1/3, 2/5, 1/2, 3/5, 2/3, 3/4, 4/5, 5/6, 6/7, 8/9, and 9/10. Code rates 1/4, 1/3, and 2/5 have been introduced for exceptionally poor reception conditions in combination with QPSK modulation. Encoding values 8/9 and 9/10 behave poorly under marginal link conditions (where the signal level is below the noise level). However, with targeted spot Ku or Ka band downlinks these code rates may be recommended to prevent out-of-region viewing for copyright or cultural reasons.
- Optional input stream synchronization to provide a constant end-to-end delay.

Depending on code rate and modulation, the system can operate at a C/N between −2.4 dB (QPSK, 1/4) and 16 dB (32APSK, 9/10) with a quasi-error free goal of a 10^{−7} TS packet error rate. Distance to the Shannon limit ranges from 0.7 dB to 1.2 dB.

Modes and features of DVB-S2 in comparison to DVB-S:

	DVB-S	DVB-S2
Input interface	Single transport stream (TS)	Multiple transport stream and generic stream encapsulation (GSE)
Modes	Constant coding & modulation	Variable coding & modulation and adaptive coding & modulation
FEC	Reed–Solomon (RS) 1/2, 2/3, 3/4, 5/6, 7/8	LDPC + BCH 1/4, 1/3, 2/5, 1/2, 3/5, 2/3, 3/4, 4/5, 5/6, 6/7, 8/9, 9/10
Modulation	Single-carrier QPSK	QPSK, 8PSK, 16APSK, 32APSK
Interleaving	Bit-interleaving	Bit-interleaving
Pilots	Pilot symbols	Pilot symbols

== Use cases ==
DVB-S2 is used for satellite television broadcasting, broadband service, and professional video and data communications. Principal applications include:

- Television broadcasting and distribution
- Satellite Broadband and interactive services
- Television contribution and satellite news gathering
- Professional data distribution and network trunking

== Improvements over DVB-S ==
DVB-S2 is 30% more efficient than DVB-S. It allows a wider range of applications combining DVB-S features (for household tasks), and DVB-DSNG (for professional tasks). DVB-S2 can adapt codification to maximize satellites resources value. It is compatible with last generation.

The main disadvantage, there are many millions of devices deployed using DVB-S over the world which has to be upgraded.

The next table compares both standards.

Satellite EIRP (dBW)	51		53.7	
System	DVB-S	DVB-S2	DVB-S	DVB-S2
Modulation and codification	QPSK 2/3	QPSK 3/4	QPSK 7/8	8PSK 2/3
Speed per token	27.5 (a = 0.35)	30.9 (a = 0.25)	27.5 (a = 0.35)	29.7 (a = 0.25)
C/N, 27.5 MHz (dB)	5.1	5.1	7.8	7.8
Bitrate (Mbit/s)	33.8	46 (+36%)	44.4	58.8 (+32%)
No. channels SDTV	7 MPEG-2, 15 AVC	10 MPEG-2, 21 AVC	10 MPEG-2, 20 AVC	13 MPEG-2, 27 AVC
No. channels HDTV	1–2 MPEG-2, 3–4 AVC	2 MPEG-2, 5 AVC	2 MPEG-2, 5 AVC	3 MPEG-2, 6 AVC

== The DVB-S to DVB-S2 upgrade process ==
The conversion process from DVB-S to DVB-S2 is being accelerated, due to the rapid increase of HDTV and introduction of 3D-HDTV. The main factor slowing down this process is the need to replace or upgrade set-top boxes, or acquire TVs with DVB-S2 integrated tuners, which makes the transition slower for established operators.

Current direct-to-home broadcasters using DVB-S2 are:

Australia

- VAST fully replaced the previous DVB-S Aurora service from December 2013. The extra capacity has allowed a Network Ten affiliate to be added along with five HD, seven SD multi-channels and limited advertisement targeting for viewers in DVB-T black-spot areas on Optus C1/D3 156E).
- Foxtel use this for their four HD downlinks on Optus D3 @ 156E.

Austria, Germany and Switzerland

- ARD and ZDF.
- HD+.
- Servus TV.
- Sky.
- SRG SSR.

Bangladesh

- All channels using Bangladesh Satellite-1 to broadcast TV channels are using DVB-S2.

Hungary

- Hello HD (also uses DVB-S for some SD and HD channels).
- Magyar Telekom.
- UPC Direct; also operates in Slovakia and the Czech Republic.

India

- Sun Direct is the first broadcaster in India commenced transmission of HD Channels on DVB-S2 way back in 2007.
- Airtel Digital TV.
- Videocon d2h.
- Dish TV for all its HD/SD channel transmissions via AsiaSat 5 and DVB-S is being used for transmissions via NSS-6..
- Tata Sky for its HD channel transmissions via INSAT-4A.

Iran

- IRIB on Badr5 26°E and on Intelsat 902 62°E and on Eutelsat W3A 7°E.
- Gem Group on YahSat 1A 52.5°E.

Turkey

- Digiturk on Türksat 4A/5B/6A 42°E.
- D-Smart on Türksat 4A 42°E.
- TRT (HDTV feed only) on Turksat 4A/5B/6A 42°E.
- DTVH (HD feed only) on Turksat 3A 42°E.

United Kingdom and Ireland

- Sky Q
- BBC (for all its HD channels, which are part of the Sky and Freesat services).
- ITV; Central West and Meridian South variants of ITV HD only (as of January 17, 2013).
- STV (STV HD channel).
- Saorsat (only available in Ireland).

Romania

- Dolce operated by Romtelecom (now Telekom Romania), only for HD channels. For SD channels is using DVB-S. Backward compatibility, if subscribed to HD package. Service can only be accessed with proprietary Set-top-boxes. NDS Encrypted. Card paired with set top box. If You have a HD receiver from them, you are able to receive two HD channels in basic package. Needs special antena for HD.
- Focus Sat operated by UPC Romania, only for HD .SD remains in DVB-S ( except fashion TV SD). Can be used with a DVB-S receiver for SD channels, or DVB-S2 for SD and HD. May be used also with a CAM and a TV with built in DVB-S (for SD channels)or DVB-S2 (Both SD and HD) tuner and common interface slot. HD channels are offered on separate package, therefore aside a HD terminal (TV or STB), you need to pay this package. CONNAX CAS 7 Encryption. Card not paired with receiver.
- Orange TV operated by Orange Romania, only in DVB-S2 both SD and HD. Viaccess Encrypted. Only available with proprietary set top boxes. Card paired with set top box. Set top boxes are only HD, these channels are available from the cheapest package.
- Digi TV, operated by RCS & RDS (since March 2014). Until March 2014, only DVB-S, SD. Nagravision 3 Encrypted. Although it is said that the card and receiver are paired, some subscribers stated that the service can also be accessed with a TV with built in DVB-S/S2 tuner and common interface by using a CAM. However, Until March 2014, only SD channels were available. Needs special subscribing for HD. DVB-S is used in SD reception while DVB-S2 is used both for SD and HD.

Other countries

- Astro in Malaysia (currently only for HD channels; uses DVB-S for backwards compatibility with SD channels).
- Bell Satellite TV in Canada (experimentally).
- Canal+ in Spain.
- CanalDigitaal in the Netherlands (HD channels only + some SD channels on Astra 3 23.5°E).
- CanalSat in France.
- Cignal in Philippines.
- Claro TV Satelital in Guatemala, Honduras, El Salvador, Nicaragua and Dominican Republic.
- Cosmote TV in Greece.
- Dialog TV in Sri Lanka for HD channels and some SD channels; other SD channels use DVB-S.
- Digital+ in Spain (currently only for HD channels and only on Astra).
- DirecTV in the US using H.264/MPEG-4 AVC codec for local and some national HDTV channels (newer satellites).
- Dish Network in the US (new channels).
- DStv in South Africa for HD channels; SD channels use DVB-S.
- ENTV in Algeria since July 17, 2021.
- GVT TV in Brazil. (Available to current customers of the GVT ADSL and telephony services).
- HRT in Croatia (from December 1).
- meo in Portugal.
- nc+ in Poland.
- MTS and Platform HD in Russia.
- Sky Direct in Philippines.
- Sky HD in Italy.
- Skylife in South Korea.
- SKY PerfecTV! in Japan.
- Sky Network Television in New Zealand upgraded all its transponders on Optus D1 @ 160E to DVB-S2 in March 2019. This was previously only used for their HD channels.
- TopTV in South Africa (services launched May 1, 2010).
- Viasat in Ukraine.
- Vivacom in Bulgaria.
- VTC in Vietnam.
- Satellite BG in Bulgaria.

These broadcasters have used DVB-S2 in their internal broadcast distribution networks, but may not have instituted DVB-S2 transmissions for consumers.

== Licensing ==
Sisvel, a Luxembourg-based company, administers the licenses for patents applying to this standard, as well as other patent pools.
