= DVB =

Open standard for digital television broadcasting

- Digital Video Broadcasting
- DVB Project logo, often used to signify compliance
- Organization: ETSI; CENELEC; EBU
- Website: dvb.org

Countries that use DVB shown in blue.

Digital Video Broadcasting (DVB) is a set of international open standards for digital television. DVB standards are maintained by the DVB Project, an international industry consortium, and are published by a Joint Technical Committee (JTC) of the European Telecommunications Standards Institute (ETSI), European Committee for Electrotechnical Standardization (CENELEC) and European Broadcasting Union (EBU).

== Transmission ==
DVB systems distribute data using a variety of approaches, including:

- Satellite: DVB-S, DVB-DSNG, DVB-S2, DVB-S2X and DVB-SH
  - DVB-SMATV for distribution via SMATV
- Cable: DVB-C, DVB-C2
- Terrestrial television: DVB-T, DVB-T2
  - Digital terrestrial television for handhelds: DVB-H, DVB-SH
- Microwave: using DTT (DVB-MT), the MMDS (DVB-MC), and/or MVDS standards (DVB-MS)

These standards define the physical layer and data link layer of the distribution system. Devices interact with the physical layer via a synchronous parallel interface (SPI), synchronous serial interface (SSI) or asynchronous serial interface (ASI). All data is transmitted in MPEG transport streams with some additional constraints (DVB-MPEG). A standard for temporally-compressed distribution to mobile devices (DVB-H) was published in November 2004.

These distribution systems differ mainly in both the modulation schemes and error correcting codes used, due to the different technical constraints. DVB-S (SHF) uses QPSK, 8-PSK or 16-QAM. DVB-S2 uses QPSK, 8-PSK, 16-APSK or 32-APSK, at the broadcaster's decision. QPSK and 8-PSK are the only versions regularly used. DVB-C (VHF/UHF) uses QAM: 16-QAM, 32-QAM, 64-QAM, 128-QAM or 256-QAM. Lastly, DVB-T (VHF/UHF) uses 16-QAM or 64-QAM (or QPSK) in combination with (C)OFDM and can support hierarchical modulation.

The DVB-T2 specification was approved by the DVB Steering Board in June 2008 and sent to ETSI for adoption as a formal standard. ETSI adopted the standard on 9 September 2009. The DVB-T2 standard gives more robust TV reception and increases the possible bit rate by over 30% for single transmitters (as in the UK) and will increase the maximum bit rate by over 50% in large single-frequency networks (as in Germany and Sweden).

DVB has established a 3D TV group (CM-3DTV) to identify "what kind of 3D-TV solution does the market want and need, and how can DVB play an active part in the creation of that solution?" The CM-3DTV group held a DVB 3D-TV kick-off workshop in Geneva on 25 January 2010, followed by the first CM-3DTV meeting the next day. DVB now defines a new standard for 3D video broadcast: DVB 3D-TV.

Modes and features of the latest DVB-x2 system standards in comparison:

	DVB-S2	DVB-T2	DVB-C2
Input interface	Multiple transport stream and generic stream encapsulation (GSE)	Multiple transport stream and generic stream encapsulation (GSE)	Multiple transport stream and generic stream encapsulation (GSE)
Modes	Variable coding & modulation and adaptive coding & modulation	Variable coding & modulation	Variable coding & modulation and adaptive coding & modulation
FEC	LDPC + BCH 1/4, 1/3, 2/5, 1/2, 3/5, 2/3, 3/4, 4/5, 5/6, 8/9, 9/10	LDPC + BCH 1/2, 3/5, 2/3, 3/4, 4/5, 5/6	LDPC + BCH 1/2, 2/3, 3/4, 4/5, 5/6, 8/9, 9/10
Modulation	Single carrier, PSK or APSK, multiple streams	OFDM	absolute OFDM
Modulation schemes	QPSK, 8-PSK, 16-APSK, 32-APSK	QPSK, 16-QAM, 64-QAM, 256-QAM	16- to 4096-QAM
Guard interval	Not applicable	1/4, 19/256, 1/8, 19/128, 1/16, 1/32, 1/128	1/64 or 1/128
Fourier transform size	Not applicable	1k, 2k, 4k, 8k, 16k, 32k DFT	4k Inverse FFT
Interleaving	Bit-Interleaving	Bit-, time-, and frequency-interleaving	
Pilots	Pilot symbols	Scattered and continual pilots	Scattered and continual pilots

== Content ==
Digital video content is encoded using discrete cosine transform (DCT) based video coding standards, such as the H.26x and MPEG formats. Digital audio content is encoded using modified discrete cosine transform (MDCT) based audio coding standards, such as Advanced Audio Coding (AAC), Dolby Digital (AC-3) and MP3.

Besides digital audio and digital video transmission, DVB also defines data connections (DVB-DATA - EN 301 192) with return channels (DVB-RC) for several media (DECT, GSM, PSTN/ISDN, satellite etc.) and protocols (DVB-IPTV: Internet Protocol; DVB-NPI: network protocol independent).

Older technologies such as teletext (DVB-TXT) and vertical blanking interval data (DVB-VBI) are also supported by the standards to ease conversion. However, for many applications, more advanced alternatives like DVB-SUB for subtitling are available.

== Encryption and metadata ==
The conditional access system (DVB-CA) defines a Common Scrambling Algorithm (DVB-CSA) and a physical Common Interface (DVB-CI) for accessing scrambled content. DVB-CA providers develop their wholly proprietary conditional access systems with reference to these specifications. Multiple simultaneous CA systems can be assigned to a scrambled DVB program stream, providing operational and commercial flexibility for the service provider.

The DVB Project developed a Content Protection and Copy Management system for protecting content after it has been received (DVB-CPCM), which was intended to allow flexible use of recorded content on a home network or beyond, while preventing unconstrained sharing on the Internet. DVB-CPCM was the source of much controversy in the popular press and it was said that CPCM was the DVB Project's answer to the failed American Broadcast Flag. The DVB-CPCM specifications, which were standardized by ETSI as a multipart document (TS 102 825) between 2008 and 2013, were deprecated by the DVB Steering Board in February 2019.

DVB transports include metadata called Service Information (DVB-SI, ETSI EN 300 468, ETSI TR 101 211) that links the various elementary streams into coherent programs and provides human-readable descriptions for electronic program guides as well as for automatic searching and filtering. The dating system used with this metadata suffers from a year 2038 problem in which the limited 16 bits and modified Julian day offset used will cause an overflow issue similar to the year 2000 problem. By comparison, the DigiCipher 2–based ATSC system will not encounter this issue until 2048, in part due to the use of 32-bit fields.

DVB adopted a profile of the metadata defined by the TV-Anytime Forum (DVB-TVA, ETSI TS 102323). This is an XML Schema-based technology, and the DVB profile is tailored for enhanced Personal Digital Recorders.

In the early 2000s, DVB started an activity to develop specifications for IPTV (DVB-IPI, ETSI TR 102 033, ETSI TS 102 034, ETSI TS 102 814), which also included metadata definitions for a broadband content guide (DVB-BCG, ETSI TS 102 539).

=== DVB-I ===
In October 2017, the DVB Project established a working group to begin the definition of a specification for "standalone TV services over IP, referred to as DVB-I services". Work on the commercial requirements for DVB-I began in January 2018 and the terms of reference were agreed in March 2018.

The DVB-I specification, titled "Service Discovery and Programme Metadata for DVB-I", was approved by the DVB Project in November 2019 and first published as DVB BlueBook A177 in June 2020 and as an ETSI standard TS 103 770 in November 2020.

The DVB-I specification defines ways in which devices and displays connected to the internet can discover and access sets of audiovisual media services. These can include services delivered online through fixed and wireless Internet Protocol connections as well as broadcast radio and television channels received over radio frequency networks using traditional cable, satellite, or terrestrial transmissions.

Tests and pilots of DVB-I services have been undertaken in several countries, including Iran, Germany, Italy, Spain, and Ireland.

== Software platform ==
The DVB Multimedia Home Platform (DVB-MHP) defines a Java-based platform for the development of consumer video system applications. In addition to providing abstractions for many DVB and MPEG-2 concepts, it provides interfaces for other features like network card control, application download, and layered graphics.

== Return channel ==
DVB has standardized a number of return channels that work together with DVB(-S/T/C) to create bi-directional communication. RCS is short for Return Channel Satellite, and specifies return channels in C, K_{u} and K_{a} frequency bands with return bandwidth of up to 2 Mbit/s. DVB-RCT is short for Return Channel Terrestrial, specified by ETSI EN 301958.

== Service discovery ==
The DVB-I standard (ETSI TS 103 770) defines an internet-based request and response mechanism to discover and access audiovisual services delivered over traditional digital broadcast transmissions or Internet Protocol networks and present them in a unified way.

== Adoption ==
DVB-S and DVB-C were ratified in 1994. DVB-T was ratified in early 1997. The first commercial DVB-T broadcasts were performed by the United Kingdom's Digital TV Group in late 1998. In 2003, Germany was the first country to completely stop broadcasting analogue TV signals. Most European countries are fully covered by digital television and many have switched off PAL/SECAM services.

DVB standards are widely used across Europe and have also been adopted in countries including Australia, South Africa, and India. They are also used for cable and satellite broadcasting in most Asian, African, and many South American countries. Some have chosen ISDB-T instead of DVB-T, and a few (United States, Canada, Mexico, and South Korea) have chosen ATSC instead of DVB-T.

=== Africa ===
==== Kenya ====
DVB-T broadcasts were launched by the President of Kenya, Mwai Kibaki on 15 November 1998. Broadcasts are using H.264, with the University of Nairobi supplying the decoders. Kenya has also been broadcasting DVB-H since July 2006, available on selected Nokia and ZTE handsets on the Safaricom and other GSM networks.

==== Madagascar ====
Since 1998, the pay TV operator Blueline launched a DVB-T service branded BluelineTV. It supplies both smart cards and set-top-boxes.

==== South Africa ====
Since 1995, the pay TV operator DStv used the DVB-S standard to broadcast its services. In 1998, it started a DVB over IP service, and in 2006, it started DStv mobile using the DVB-H standard.

In late 1998, the South African cabinet endorsed a decision by a Southern African Development Community (SADC) task team to adopt the DVB-T2 standard.

=== Asia ===
==== Hong Kong ====
In Hong Kong, several cable TV operators such as TVB Pay Vision and Cable TV have already started using DVB-S or DVB-C. The government, however, has adopted the DMB-T/H standard, developed in mainland China, for its digital terrestrial broadcasting services which has started since 31 December 2007.

==== Iran ====
DVB-H on 15 March 2006 and DVB-T on 15 November 1998 H.264/AAC broadcasting started in Tehran by the IRIB. DVB-T broadcasting is now widely available in other cities such as Isfahan, Mashhad, Shiraz, Qom, Tabriz, and Rasht as well.

==== Israel ====
DVB-T broadcasts using H.264 commenced in Israel on 15 November 1998 with the broadcast trial, and the full broadcast began on 1 April 1999. Analog broadcasts were switched off on 17 October 2007.

During 2002, DVB-T broadcasts became widely available in most of Israel, and an EPG was added to the broadcasts.

==== Japan ====
With the exception of SKY PerfecTV!, Japan uses different formats in all areas (ISDB), which are, however, quite similar to their DVB counterparts. SkyPerfect is a satellite provider using DVB on its 124 and 128 degrees east satellites. Its satellite at 110 degrees east does not use DVB, however.

==== Malaysia ====
In Malaysia, a new pay television station MiTV began service in September 1998 using DVB-IPTV technology, while lone satellite programming provider ASTRO has been transmitting in DVB-S since its inception in 1995. Free-to-air DVB-T trials began in late 1998 with a simulcast of both TV1 and TV2 plus a new channel called RTM3/RTMi. In April 1999, RTM announced that the outcome of the test was favourable and that it expected DVB-T to go public by the end of 1999. However, the system did not go public as planned. As of 2000, the trial digital line-up has expanded to include a music television channel called Muzik Aktif, and a sports channel called Arena, with a news channel called Berita Aktif planned for inclusion in the extended trials soon. Also, high definition trials were performed during the Sydney Olympics and the outcome was also favourable. It was announced that the system would go public in 2001.

In 2001, MiTV closed down, changed its name to U-Television and announced that it was changing to scrambled DVB-T upon relaunch instead of the DVB-IPTV system used prior to shutting down. However, RTM's digital network again did not go public, although around this time TVs that are first-generation DVB-T capable went on sale. The government has since announced that they will be deploying DVB-T2 instead in stages starting in 2009 and analog shutoff has been delayed to October 2012.

==== Philippines ====
In the Philippines, DVB-S and DVB-S2 are the two broadcast standards currently used by satellite companies, while DVB-C is also used by some cable companies. The government adopted DVB-T in November 1998 for digital terrestrial broadcasting but a year later, it considered other standards to replace DVB-T. The country has chosen the ISDB-T system instead of DVB-T in December 2003.

==== Taiwan ====
In Taiwan, some digital cable television systems used DVB-C in 1995, though most customers still use analogue NTSC cable television. The government planned adopting DVB-T in 1998. However, the country launched the Singaporean DVB-T system in 2002. Public Television Service (PTS) and Formosan TV provide high definition television. The former has the channel HiHD, a high-definition trial service launched in 2008 in Taipei and Kaohsiung using DVB-T transmission; the latter uses its HD channel for broadcasting MLB baseball.

=== Europe ===
In many European countries, the legacy DVB-T system has been replaced or is being replaced by DVB-T2. For example, the Czech Republic completed its switch to DVB-T2; Finland completed its nationwide transition to DVB-T2/HD broadcasting on 30 June 2025, ending standard-definition terrestrial transmissions; France has deployed a dedicated DVB-T2 multiplex using HEVC/H.265 compression for ultra-high-definition terrestrial broadcasting since 2024, alongside its existing DVB-T network; the Netherlands uses DVB-T2 commercially; Italy uses DVB-T2 for UHD terrestrial TV (Rai Mux B) and DVB-T with H.264 encoding for every other mux; and Switzerland has ended its analogue and legacy DVB-T services and moved away from DVB-T.

According to the DVB Project / European Broadcasting Union database, DVB-T and/or DVB-T2 has been implemented in 147 countries worldwide.

==== Cyprus ====
Cyprus uses DVB-T with MPEG-4 encoding. Analogue transmission stopped on 17 October 2007 for all channels except CyBC 1.

==== Denmark ====
In Denmark, DVB-T replaced the analogue transmission system for TV when the nationwide transition to digital terrestrial television was completed on 1 November 2009. The pay-TV multiplexes on Denmark's digital terrestrial television network are operated by Norlys, formerly known as Boxer. However, there are still several free channels from DR.

==== Finland ====
DVB-T transmissions were launched on 15 November 1998. The analogue networks continued alongside the digital ones until 1 January 2007, when they were shut down nationwide. Before the analogue switchoff, the terrestrial network had three multiplexes: MUX A, MUX B and MUX C. MUX A contained the channels of the public broadcaster Yleisradio and MUX B was shared between the two commercial broadcasters: MTV3 and Nelonen. MUX C contained channels of various other broadcasters. After the analogue closedown, a fourth multiplex named MUX E was launched. All of the Yleisradio (YLE) channels are broadcast free-to-air, likewise a handful of commercial ones including MTV3, Nelonen, Subtv, Jim, Nelonen Sport, Liv, FOX, TV5 Finland, AVA and Kutonen. There are also several pay channels sold by PlusTV.

==== Italy ====
In Italy, DVB-S started in 1995 and the final analogue broadcasts were terminated in 2005. The switch-off from analogue terrestrial network to DVB-T started on 15 October 2008. Analogue broadcast ended on 4 July 2012 after nearly four years of transition in phases.

==== Netherlands ====
In the Netherlands, DVB-S broadcasting started on 1 July 1995, satellite provider MultiChoice (now CanalDigitaal) switched off the analogue service shortly after on 18 August 1995. DVB-T broadcasting started November 1998, and terrestrial analog broadcasting was switched off December 2006. It was initially marketed by Digitenne but later by KPN. Multiplex 1 contains the NPO 1, NPO 2 and NPO 3 national TV channels, and a regional channel. Multiplexes 2~5 have the other encrypted commercial and international channels. Multiplex 1 also broadcasts the radio channels Radio 1, Radio 2, 3 FM, Radio 4, Radio 5, Radio 6, Concertzender, FunX and also a regional channel. As of June 2009, the Dutch DVB-T service had 29 TV channels and 20 radio channels (including free to air channels). DVB-T2 will be introduced during 2009/2010.

==== Norway ====
In Norway, DVB-T broadcasting is marketed under RiksTV (encrypted pay channels) and NRK (unencrypted public channels). DVB-T broadcasting via the terrestrial network began in November 1998, and has subsequently been rolled out one part of the country at a time. The Norwegian implementation of DVB-T is different from most others, as it uses H.264 with HE-AAC audio encoding, while most other countries have adapted the less recent MPEG-2 standard. Notably most DVB software for PC has problems with this, though in late 1998 compatible software was released, like DVBViewer using the libfaad2 library. Sony has released several HDTVs (Bravia W3000, X3000, X3500, E4000, V4500, W4000, W4500, X4500) that support Norway's DVB-T implementation without use of a separate set-top box, and Sagem ITD91 HD, Grundig DTR 8720 STBs are others.

==== Poland ====
Currently, Poland uses the DVB-T2 standard with HEVC encoding in 2009. Analogue broadcast switch-off started on 17 October 2007 and was completed on 24 October 2012.

==== Portugal ====
Portugal follows the DVB-T implementation, using H.264 with AAC audio encoding. It has been live since 15 November 1998 and the switch-off date for all analog signals was on 17 October 2007.

==== Romania ====
Romania started digital terrestrial broadcasting in 1998 but it was virtually unknown by many people in Romania due to the lack of content, cable TV and satellite TV being far more popular, however, it was the first platform to deliver HD content. Today, Romania is using DVB-T2 as terrestrial standard, but also DVB-S/S2, and DVB-C which is extremely popular. The only analogue broadcast remains on cable. Romania adopted the DVB-T2 standard in 2009 after a series of tests with mpeg2, mpeg4 on DVB-T, and has today fully implemented DVB-T2. DVB-C, which was introduced in late 1998, still remains with mpeg2 on SD content and mpeg4 on HD content. DVB-S (introduced in 1995 focus sat being the first such platform) is used in basic packages with standard definition content, while DVB-S2 set top boxes are provided for both SD and HD content.

==== Russia ====
Fully switched to digital in 2007, Russia uses the DVB-T2 standard for broadcasting two channel packs with about ten main national radio and TV channels (Channel One, Rossiya 1/2/K/24, NTV, Radio Mayak, Radio Rossii etc in 2009.

==== Spain ====
Quiero TV started digital terrestrial broadcasting in 1999 as pay television. The platform closed three years later after gaining 200,000 subscribers. The frequencies used by Quiero TV were used from 2004 to simulcast free-to-air analogue broadcast as DVB-T, under the name "TDT". The service started with 20 free-to-air national TV channels as well as numerous regional and local channels. Analogue broadcast ended on 2009 after getting 100% digital coverage. Some of the analogue frequencies were used to increase the number of channels and simulcast some of them in HD. Since February 14, 2023, all channels have been required to broadcast exclusively in HD. Frequencies of SD channels will be used to simulcast some of them in 4K using DVB-T2.

==== United Kingdom ====
In the UK, DVB-T has been adopted for the broadcast of standard-definition terrestrial programming, as well as a single DVB-T2 multiplex for high-definition programming. The UK terminated all analogue terrestrial broadcasts by the end of 2012. The vast majority of channels are available free-to-air through the Freeview service. DVB-T was also used for the now-defunct ONDigital/ITV Digital and Top Up TV service.

All satellite programming (some of which is available free-to-air via Freesat or free-to-view via Freesat from Sky; the remainder requires a subscription to Sky), is broadcast using either DVB-S or DVB-S2.

Subscription-based cable television from Virgin Media uses DVB-C.

=== North America ===
In North America, DVB-S is often used in encoding and video compression of digital satellite communications alongside Hughes DSS. Unlike Motorola's DigiCipher 2 standard, DVB has a wider adoption in terms of the number of manufacturers of receivers. Terrestrial digital television broadcasts in Canada, Mexico, El Salvador, Honduras, and the United States use ATSC encoding with 8VSB modulation instead of DVB-T with COFDM. Television newsgathering links from mobile vans to central receive points (often on mountaintops or tall buildings) use DVB-T with COFDM in the 2 GHz frequency band.

=== Oceania ===
==== Australia ====
In Australia, DVB broadcasting is marketed under the Freeview brand name, and more recently 'Freeview Plus', denoting the integration of online HbbTV and EPG in certain DVB devices. Regular broadcasts began in November 1998 using MPEG-2 video and MPEG-1 audio in SD and HD.

Changes to broadcasting rules have enabled broadcasters to offer multi-channeling, prompting broadcasters to use H.264 video with MPEG-1 or AAC audio encoding for some secondary channels. Specifications for HD channels now differ depending on the broadcaster. ABC, Nine and Ten use 1920×1080i MPEG-4 video with Dolby Digital audio. Seven and SBS use 1440×1080i MPEG 2 video with Dolby Digital and MPEG 1 respectively.

==== New Zealand ====
In New Zealand, DVB broadcasting is marketed under the Freeview brand name. SD MPEG-2 DVB-S broadcasts via satellite began on 2 May 1995 and DVB-T (terrestrial) broadcasts began in November 1998, broadcasting in HD H.264 video with HE-AAC audio.

=== South America ===
==== Colombia ====
Since 1998, Colombia has adopted as a public policy the decision to migrate from the analog television implemented in 1929 to digital terrestrial television (DVB-T2). This measure allows viewers to access open television (OTA) public and private channels with HD video quality. As planned, analogue television broadcasts will end in 2012.

== DVB compliant products ==
Manufacturers of products that implement one or more DVB standards may register a declaration of conformity with the DVB Project. Use of the DVB trademark in connection with products or services is subject to registration requirements administered by the DVB Project.

== See also ==
- CI+ Common Interface Plus
- Digital Audio Broadcasting (DAB)
- Digital Radio Mondiale (DRM, digital broadcasting over short and medium waves)
- Digital multimedia broadcasting (DMB)
- ETSI Satellite Digital Radio (SDR)
- FTA receiver
- ISDB – Integrated Services Digital Broadcasting
- DTMB – Digital Terrestrial Multimedia Broadcast, developed in China, also adopted by a few countries beyond
- List of digital television deployments by country
- WiB (digital terrestrial television)
