= DVB-S2X =

Extension of DVB-S2

DVB-S2X is a digital satellite television broadcast standard.

DVB-S2X is an extension of DVB-S2 satellite digital broadcasting standard. It was standardized by DVB Project in March 2014 as an optional extension of DVB-S2 standard. It became an ETSI standard.

== Main features ==
DVB-S2X increased efficiency up to 51% over DVB-S2.

Improvements include:

- Higher order modulation schemes (64/128/256APSK)
- Smaller roll-off factors of 5%, 10% and 15% (though even legacy DVB-S and DVB-S2 receivers can benefit from it)
- Improved filtering enabling smaller carrier spacing
- Channel bonding in order to combine several carriers, increasing efficiency in 'Direct-To-Home' (DTH) applications

Channel bonding helps, particularly for UHDTV services. Statistical multiplexing is often used to allow more television services to fit into a single satellite channel. Statistical multiplexing works best when many television channels can share bandwidth. With UHDTV services, it may be possible to fit only 3 services in a single satellite channel, which reduces the effectiveness of statistical multiplexing. Bonding channels increases the number UHDTV services within the bonded channel, allowing statistical multiplexing to work more efficiently.

Because of a lack of backward compatibility with DVB-S2 decoders, Belgian company Newtec developed the 'DVB-S2plus/Extensions' technology.

== Use cases ==
A possible use case is the launch of UHDTV-1 (e.g., 4k) television services in Ku-/Ka-band with HEVC encoding.

== See also ==
- DVB-S
- DVB-S2
