= DVB-C =

Digital cable television standard

Digital Video Broadcasting - Cable (DVB-C) is the DVB European consortium standard for the broadcast transmission of digital television over cable. This system transmits an MPEG-2 or MPEG-4 family digital audio/digital video stream, using a QAM modulation with channel coding. The standard was first published by the ETSI in 1994, and subsequently became the most widely used transmission system for digital cable television in Europe, Asia and South America. It is deployed worldwide in systems ranging from the larger cable television networks (CATV) down to smaller satellite master antenna TV (SMATV) systems.

== Technical description ==
=== DVB-C transmitter ===
Scheme of a DVB-C transmission system

With reference to the figure, a short description of the single processing blocks follows.

- Source coding and MPEG-2 multiplexing (MUX): video, audio, and data streams are multiplexed into an MPEG program stream (MPEG-PS). One or more MPEG-PSs are joined together into an MPEG transport stream (MPEG-TS). This is the basic digital stream which is being transmitted and received by home set top boxes (STB) or relevant integrable decoder (e.g. Conax) module. Allowed bit rates for the transported MPEG-2 depend on a number of modulation parameters: it can range from about 6 to about 64 Mbit/s (see the bottom figure for a complete listing).
- MUX adaptation and energy dispersal: the MPEG-TS is identified as a sequence of data packets, of fixed length (188 bytes). With a technique called energy dispersal, the byte sequence is decorrelated.
- External encoder: a first level of protection is applied to the transmitted data, using a nonbinary block code, a Reed–Solomon RS (204, 188) code, allowing the correction of up to a maximum of 8 wrong bytes for each 188-byte packet.
- External interleaver: convolutional interleaving is used to rearrange the transmitted data sequence, such way it becomes more rugged to long sequences of errors.
- Byte/m-tuple conversion: data bytes are encoded into bit m-tuples (m = 4, 5, 6, 7, or 8).
- Differential coding: In order to get a rotation-invariant constellation, this unit shall apply a differential encoding of the two Most Significant Bits (MSBs) of each symbol.
- QAM Mapper: the bit sequence is mapped into a base-band digital sequence of complex symbols. There are 5 allowed modulation modes: 16-QAM, 32-QAM, 64-QAM, 128-QAM, 256-QAM.
- Base-band shaping: the QAM signal is filtered with a raised-cosine shaped filter, in order to remove mutual signal interference at the receiving side.
- DAC and front-end: the digital signal is transformed into an analog signal, with a digital-to-analog converter (DAC), and then modulated to radio frequency by the RF front-end.

Available bit rates for a DVB-C system (Mbit/s)
Modulation	Bandwidth (MHz)				
Modulation	2	4	6	8	10
16-QAM	6.41	12.82	19.23	25.64	32.05
32-QAM	8.01	16.03	24.04	32.05	40.07
64-QAM	9.62	19.23	28.85	38.47	48.08
128-QAM	11.22	22.44	33.66	44.88	56.10
256-QAM	12.82	25.64	38.47	51.29	64.11

=== DVB-C receiver ===
The receiving STB adopts techniques which are dual to those used in the transmission.

- Front-end and ADC: the analog RF signal is converted to base-band and transformed into a digital signal, using an analog-to-digital converter (ADC).
- QAM Demodulation
- Equalization
- Differential decoding
- Outer interleaving
- Outer decoding
- MUX adaptation
- MPEG-2 demultiplexing and source decoding
- Programmable Transport Stream

== DVB-C2 ==
On February 18, 2008 it was announced that a new standard – DVB-C2 – would be developed during 2008, and a "Call for Technologies" was issued. Proposals including simulation programs and information on patent rights could be submitted until June 16, 2008.

"The results of the DVB-C2 Study Mission already provided clear indications that technologies are available allowing the performance of the second generation DVB cable transmission system to get so close to the theoretical Shannon Limit that any further improvements in the future would most likely not be able to justify the introduction of a disruptive third generation of cable transmission system." (DVB-C2 CfT)

By using state of the art coding and modulation techniques, DVB-C2 should offer greater than 30% higher spectrum efficiency under the same conditions, and the gains in downstream channel capacity will be greater than 60% for optimized HFC networks.

The final DVB-C2 specification was approved by the DVB Steering Board in April 2009.

DVB-C2 allows bit rates up to 83.1 Mbit/s on an 8 MHz channel bandwidth when using 4096-QAM modulation; future extensions will allow up to 97 Mbit/s and 110.8 Mbit/s per channel using 16384-QAM and 65536-AQAM modulation.

While a second generation system, DVB-C2, was developed, it was not deployed in the market.

== Countries that use DVB-C ==
- Albania
- Argentina
- Armenia
- Australia
- Austria
- Azerbaijan
- Belarus
- Belgium
- Bosnia and Herzegovina
- Brazil
- Bulgaria
- China
- Colombia
- Croatia
- Cyprus
- Czech Republic
- Denmark
- Ecuador
- Estonia
- Finland
- France prior to IPTV before 2014.
- Germany
- Georgia
- Gibraltar
- Greenland
- Hong Kong
- Hungary
- India
- Indonesia
- Ireland
- Israel
- Kazakhstan
- Latvia
- Lebanon
- Liechtenstein
- Lithuania
- Luxembourg
- Macau
- North Macedonia
- Mali
- Malta
- Moldova
- Mexico
- Montenegro
- Nepal
- Netherlands
- New Zealand
- Norway
- Pakistan
- Peru
- Philippines
- Poland
- Portugal
- Romania
- Russia
- Serbia
- Singapore Discontinued in 2019.
- Slovakia
- Slovenia
- Spain
- Sri Lanka
- Sweden
- Switzerland
- Taiwan
- Tanzania
- Thailand
- Turkey
- Ukraine
- United Kingdom
- Uruguay
- Venezuela
- Vietnam

== See also ==
- ATSC Standards
- Digital cable
- Digital Video Broadcasting (DVB)
- Digital Multimedia Broadcasting (DMB)
- Digital television (DTV)
- DVB-CI
- DigiCipher 2
- QAM - the US term for the North American equivalent to DVB-C
