= Voice inversion =

Method of obscuring transmission

Voice inversion scrambling is an analog method of obscuring the content of a transmission. It is sometimes used in public service radio, automobile racing, cordless telephones and the Family Radio Service. Without a descrambler, the transmission makes the speaker "sound like Donald Duck". Despite the term, the technique operates on the passband of the information and so can be applied to any information being transmitted.

== Forms and details ==
There are various forms of voice inversion which offer differing levels of security. Overall, voice inversion scrambling offers little true security as software and even hobbyist kits are available from kit makers for scrambling and descrambling. The cadence of the speech is not changed. It is often easy to guess what is happening in the conversation by listening for other audio cues like questions, short responses and other language cadences.

In the simplest form of voice inversion, the frequency $p$ of each component is replaced with $s-p$, where $s$ is the frequency of a carrier wave. This can be done by amplitude modulating the speech signal with the carrier, then applying a low-pass filter to select the lower sideband. This will make the low tones of the voice sound like high ones and vice versa. This process also occurs naturally if a radio receiver is tuned to a single sideband transmission but set to decode the wrong sideband.

There are more advanced forms of voice inversion which are more complex and require more effort to descramble. One method is to use a random code to choose the carrier frequency and then change this code in real time. This is called Rolling Code voice inversion and one can often hear the "ticks" in the transmission which signal the changing of the inversion point.

Another method is split band voice inversion. This is where the band is split and then each band is inverted separately. A rolling code can also be added to this method for variable split band inversion (VSB).

Common carrier frequencies are: 2.632 kHz, 2.718 kHz, 2.868 kHz, 3.023 kHz, 3.107 kHz, 3.196 kHz, 3.333 kHz, 3.339 kHz, 3.496 kHz, 3.729 kHz and 4.096 kHz.

Voice inversion offers no security at all and software is available to restore the original voice, which is why it is no longer used to protect conversations today. However, voice inversion is still found in low-end Chinese walkie talkies.

== See also ==
- Encryption
- Scrambler
- Secure communication – Scrambling and key distribution scheme for digital television
- Secure voice
