= DVB-H =

Digital TV standard for cellphones

DVB-H (digital video broadcasting - handheld) is one of three prevalent mobile TV formats. It is a technical specification for bringing broadcast services to mobile handsets. DVB-H was formally adopted as ETSI standard EN 302 304 in November 2004. The DVB-H specification (EN 302 304) can be downloaded from the official DVB-H website. For a few months from March 2008, DVB-H was officially endorsed by the European Union as the "preferred technology for terrestrial mobile broadcasting".

The major competitors of this technology were Qualcomm's MediaFLO system, the 3G cellular system based MBMS mobile-TV standard, and the ATSC-M/H format in the U.S.

As of 2008, the recently introduced DVB-SH (Satellite to Handhelds) and anticipated DVB-NGH (Next Generation Handheld) in the future were possible enhancements to DVB-H, providing improved spectral efficiency and better modulation flexibility.

DVB-H struggled against resistance from network operators to include the technology in their subsidized handsets. In late 2016, it was acknowledged within the DVB Project newsletter that DVB-H and DVB-SH had been a commercial failure.

Ukraine was the last country with a nationwide broadcast in DVB-H, which began transitioning to DVB-T2 during 2019.

== Technical explanation ==
DVB-H technology is a superset of the successful DVB-T (Digital Video Broadcasting - Terrestrial) system for digital terrestrial television, with additional features to meet the specific requirements of handheld, battery-powered receivers. In 2002 four main requirements of the DVB-H system were agreed: broadcast services for portable and mobile usage with 'acceptable quality'; a typical user environment, and so geographical coverage, as mobile radio; access to service while moving in a vehicle at high speed (as well as imperceptible handover when moving from one cell to another); and as much compatibility with existing digital terrestrial television (DVB-T), to allow sharing of network and transmission equipment.

DVB-H can offer a downstream channel at high data rates which can be used as standalone or as an enhancement of mobile telecommunication networks which many typical handheld terminals are able to access anyway.

Time slicing technology is employed to reduce power consumption for small handheld terminals. IP datagrams are transmitted as data bursts in small time slots. Each burst may contain up to two megabits of data (including parity bits). There are 64 parity bits for each 191 data bits, protected by Reed-Solomon codes. The front end of the receiver switches on only for the time interval when the data burst of a selected service is on air. Within this short period of time a high data rate is received which can be stored in a buffer. This buffer can either store the downloaded applications or playout live streams.

The achievable power saving depends on the relation of the on/off-time. If there are approximately ten or more bursted services in a DVB-H stream, the rate of the power saving for the front end could be up to 90%. DVB-H is a technical system which was carefully tested by the DVB-H Validation Task Force in the course of 2004 (see ETSI Technical Report TR 102 401). DVB-SH improved radio performances and can be seen as an evolution of DVB-H.

DVB-H Frame structure

DVB-H is designed to work in the following bands:

- VHF-III (170-230 MHz, or a portion of it)
- UHF-IV/V (470-862 MHz, or a portion of it)
- L (1.452-1.492 GHz)

DVB-SH now and DVB-NGH in the near future are expected to expand the supported bands.

DVB-H can coexist with DVB-T in the same multiplex.

== DVB-IPDC ==
DVB-IPDC (DVB for IP Datacasting) is the specification for broadcasting mobile TV services based on Internet Protocol. DVB-IPDC is a set of systems layer specifications originally designed for use with the DVB-H physical layer, but that will ultimately be used as a higher layer for all DVB mobile TV systems, including DVB-SH, and indeed as a higher layer for any other IP capable system.

In short, with regard to mobile TV, these specifications define what is delivered, how it is delivered, how it is described, and how it is protected. They cover system architecture, use cases, DVB PSI/SI signalling, electronic service guide (ESG), content delivery protocols (CDP), and service purchase and protection (SPP). Almost all of these have now been published as formal ETSI standards.

== DVB-NGH ==
In 2007 a study mission was formed to investigate the options for a potential DVB-H2 successor to DVB-H, but the project was later shelved. In November 2009, the DVB group made a 'call for technologies' for a new system (DVB-NGH - Next Generation Handheld) to update and replace the DVB-H standard for digital broadcasting to mobile devices. The schedule was for submissions to be closed in February 2010, the new ETSI standard published in 2013, and rollout of the first DVB-NGH devices from 2015.

== DVB-SH ==
The DVB-SH (Satellite services to Handheld) standard was published in February 2007. Trials are ongoing in several European countries.

== Service launches ==
In Finland, the license to operate a DVB-H network was awarded to Digita, but the service was closed in March 2012. In May 2006 they announced that they had signed a contract with Nokia to use its DVB-H platform for the service. The network was supposed to be launched on 1 December 2006, but disagreements regarding copyrights of the broadcast material have stalled the launch. Among the services available will be Voice TV and Kiss digital radio. Initially the network should cover 25% of the population with coverage area Helsinki, Oulu and Turku. Mobiili-TV started commercial services on 10 May 2007. The service was ended on 5.3.2012 due to lack of subscribers. Network operator Digita was granted to upgrade old DVB-H transmitters to next generation DVB-T2Lite technology which has ability to carry HD, SD and mobile-size picture for TV sets, laptops, pocket-PCs, mobile phones etc. simultaneously.

In India, Indian public broadcaster Prasar Bharti (also known as DD for Doordarshan) started DVB-H trials in various metropolitan areas to test the reception quality of the broadcast coverage. Moreover, DD is currently broadcasting 8 channels in the New Delhi.

In Italy, 3 Italia and Reti Radiotelevisive Digitali launched nationwide services in May 2006 (technology used), both Telecom Italia Mobile (TIM) and Mediaset in June 2006, Vodafone in December 2006. DVB OSF was the adopted security standard in this country. Since June 2008, 3 Italia has made some channels free on Dvb-h for all the users. All services had ceased by 2012.

In Singapore, DVB-H was first used for a live demonstration at a Nokia event in June 2004, where it carried Channel News Asia, being the first in the Asia Pacific region to use the technology. DVB-H was demonstrated again for the BroadcastAsia event in April 2005. In August 2008, M1, StarHub, Singtel and Mediacorp jointly conducted a consumer DVB-H trial which lasted three months and limited to 300 customers from the three telco companies. The trial carried six channels.

In the Philippines, SMART had launched its Mobile TV services, called MyTV. It is only available on the Nokia N92 and N77 mobile phone due to incompatibility of the current system with other security technologies such as DVB OSF, the one supported by all other handset manufacturers. However, with transition to OMA SmartCard Profile, it is yet to be available on other mobile phones models. This transition is not foreseen by end of 2008.

In the United States, Crown Castle had rolled out a DVB-H offering through a company they created called Modeo in 2006. It was initially offered in New York, but it was eventually terminated in 2007. Modeo was attempting to compete head-to-head with MediaFLO; which is both a Mobile TV company and Mobile TV Standard created by Qualcomm.

At the NAB trade show in April 2006, a second service launch was announced by SES Americom, Aloha Partners and Reti Radiotelevisive Digitali. Titled Hiwire Mobile Television, the service is set to begin trials in Las Vegas in Q4 2006. Hiwire owns two 6 MHz channels of spectrum at 700 MHz covering most of the country.

In Albania, DigitAlb and GrassValley launched the service on 20 December 2006, with free access up to the end of 2008. The package consists of 16 channels and covers 65% of the territory as of August 2007. The service ended in October 2010.

In Vietnam, VTC launched nationwide service on 21 December 2006. Similar issue to Smart in Philippines, the system was supporting only few Nokia handsets that limited the take-off of the service.

O_{2} Ireland commenced a trial in March 2007 with a single high site 1.2 kW transmitter at Three Rock covering the greater Dublin area.

In France, Spain and South Africa nationwide service launch is planned for 2008 or 2009, However, the unavailability of the UHF frequencies keeps on delaying services launches.

In Austria DVB-H is available since the start of UEFA Euro 2008 as result of a joint effort between Media Broad and the mobile operators 3 and Orange. The service was switched off at the end of 2010.

In Morocco, the service has been launched in May 2008.

In Switzerland, DVB-H was available from the start of UEFA Euro 2008 from Swisscom until 2010.

In Germany, the future of DVB-H is still unknown due to continuous issues with the license and open questions about the business model, in particular which role operators play in it and if they are willing to do so.

In China, two companies have been issued licenses by the government, Shanghai Media Group and China Central Television. Trials are currently underway, services were expected to be launched before the 2008 Beijing Olympics. However, in this country, China Multimedia Mobile Broadcasting (CMMB) is the standard the most deployed in 2008.

In Malaysia, 3 Italia, Maxis and Astro conducted a DVB-H trial using 3 Italia's know-how, launching in "mid 2007" with six channels. In June 2007, Nokia and MiTV planned to launch DVB-H in "the second half of 2007" through the U Mobile network, using a Nokia N77. Known as Mobile LiveTV, it carried seven channels in a package called Friendly User Program. The service was reportedly shut down in February 2009.

Kenya has a DVB-H service, DStv Mobile, which was launched in Nairobi by South African company Digital Mobile TV. Consumers will receive a package of ten DStv channels through their mobile phones at a cost of Sh1,000 per month. The channels will include SuperSport Update, SuperSport 2, SuperSport 3, CNN International, Big Brother Africa and Africa Magic.

In Iran, DVB-H services began in Tehran in March 2008. The service brings ten television and four radio channels to mobile phones.

In Estonia, DVB-H service started testing phase in April 2008 with Levira and EMT, offering up to 15 TV-stations. Testing period ended in November 2009; the service never went into commercial use.

In South Africa Multichoice launched the public version of its DVB-H service, called DSTV Mobile on 1 December 2010. During September 2018, MultiChoice announced that its DStv Mobile service will end on 31 October 2018.

In the Netherlands, KPN launched a DVB-H service on 29 May 2008. The service offers 10 channels, 1 channel specially made for the service and 9 channels which are converted regular broadcasts. On 30 March 2011, KPN announced it was terminating the DVB-H service on 1 June 2011 because of a lack of new mobiles supporting the standard which resulted in fewer users. KPN still believes in mobile video, but in the form of video-on-demand using mobile internet connections.

In Jamaica, DVB-H service was launched by telecoms provider LIME in 2010 in the capital city Kingston and its Metropolitan Area. Further upgrades were made and the service was made available in the second city, Montego Bay.

== Lack of acceptance ==
At the NAB show in April 2012, Peter Siebert of Europe's DVB Project Office said DVB-H did not succeed because so few devices were available, mainly because content producers would not subsidize them.

The competing technologies - like MediaFLO in the US - did not have any success, new sales were terminated in December 2010 and the allocated spectrum sold to AT&T.

These 1st generation transmissions protocols are not very spectrum efficient, but the fatal problem seems to be the lack of business model for mobile-TV. Very few have been willing to pay for the services. Even with a free mobile-tv signal, the daily use was often just a few minutes.

The Dutch KPN is an example. KPN quote lack of receiving devices, but even when KPN's service was initially free the average daily use was a mere 9 minutes per phone having a DVB-H receiver. (TV is typically watched 2–3 hours per day.)

As 4G/LTE became standard in most smartphones and used in many countries, it can provide the needed capacity for mobile TV within most people's data allotments. 4G/LTE has the potential of efficient multicast, which can increase the spectrum efficiency in broadcast type application to within a factor of maybe two compared to the newest (e.g. DVB-T2/T2Lite) broadcast protocols.

In late 2016, Phil Laven, the DVB Group's outgoing chairman, acknowledged within its official publication "DVB Scene" that DVB-H and DVB-SH had been a commercial failure and put this down to the reluctance of network operators to include the technology in subsidized handsets.

== See also ==
- ATSC-M/H U.S. mobile/handheld standard
- Digital Audio Broadcasting (DAB and DAB+)
- Digital Multimedia Broadcasting (DMB)
- Digital Radio Mondiale (DRM)
- Electronic program guide
- ETSI Satellite Digital Radio (SDR)
- E-VSB ATSC standard
- Handheld projector
- Integrated Services Digital Broadcasting (ISDB)
- IP over DVB
- DVB over IP
- MediaFLO
- Mobile DTV Alliance industry association
- Mobile TV a term for the entire category
- Multimedia Broadcast Multicast Service (MBMS)
- OFDM system comparison table - providing technical details
- OneSeg
- Spectral efficiency comparison table
- WiMAX
- Digital Video Broadcasting(DVB)
