= SMATV =

System for distributing television signals

SMATV (single master antenna television or satellite master antenna television), is a system for supplying and controlling the number and type of communication channels, usually television channels and FM stations to multiple televisions. It provides reception of DBS TV/FM channels for hotels, motels, dormitories, schools, hospitals and commercial properties with multiple tenants. Using a master antenna system video signals, audio signals and decoder signals can be distributed.

== Design ==
It consists of single outdoor unit or antenna feeding multiple receivers. Accessible channels can vary by user. Maintaining a high signal-to-noise ratio requires a larger antenna, typically 2–3 metres (6.6–9.8 ft) in diameter.

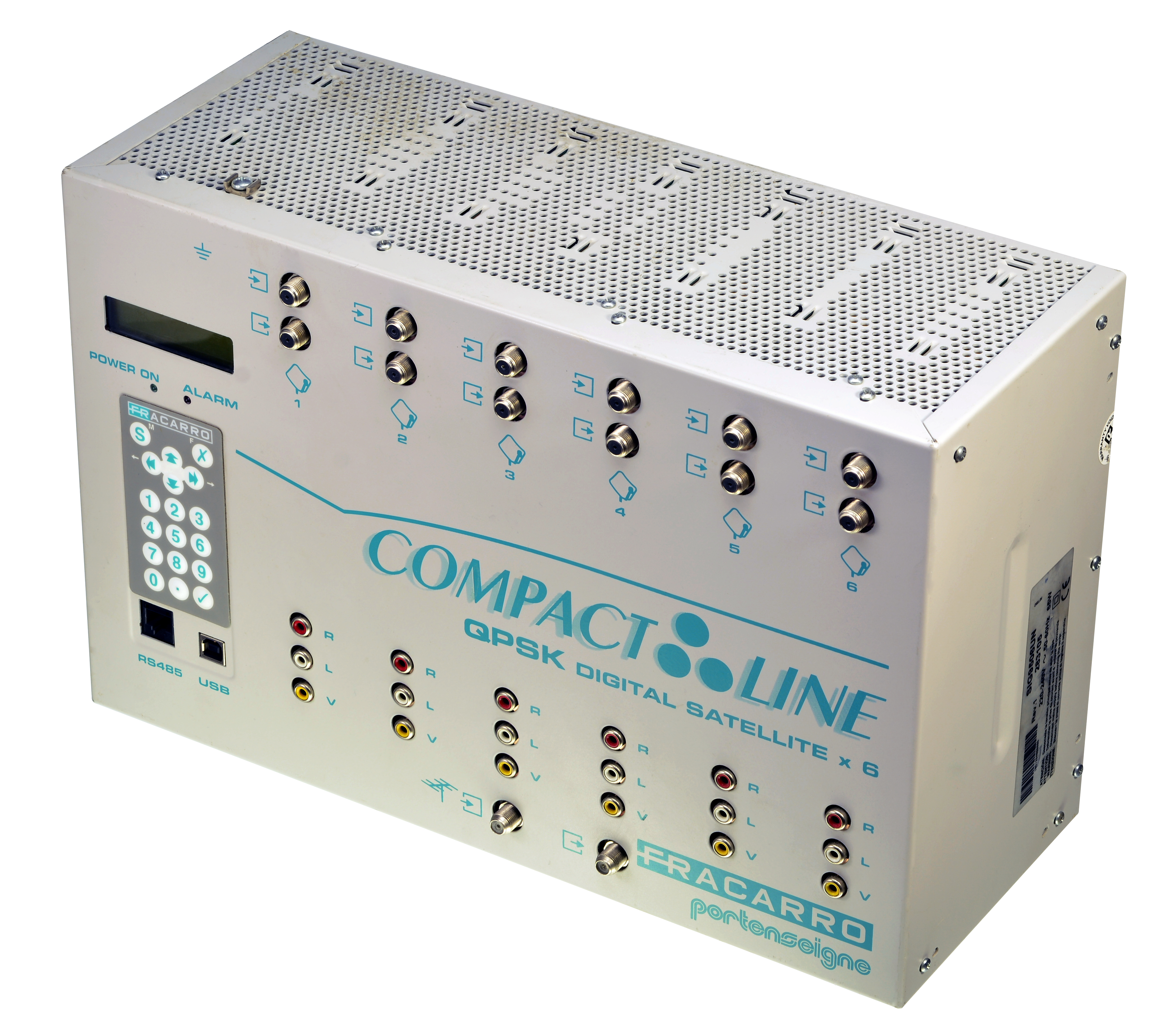
A QPSK Digital Satellite Headend by Fracarro.

A single SMATV headend receives and retransmits satellite television channels throughout a property.

The system consists of a master antenna and a matching transformer to match the balanced antenna with unbalanced cable and amplifiers. Most antennas have an impedance of around 300 Ω. To convert it to 75 Ω, a matching transformer (or balun) is used. For trunk line isolation, a resistive inductive splitter is used. The amplifier output is fed to the splitter through coaxial trunk lines.

== Distribution ==
Several methods of distribution are supported via SMATV. These include:

- IPTV (Internet Protocol) TV Systems
- COM1000 Pro:Idiom Encrypted HD Headend
- L-Band Satellite TV Distribution

The two main approaches for distribution of digital TV signals in SMATV installations are:

- Transmodulation from satellite quaternary phase shift keying QPSK to quadrature amplitude modulation QAM
- Direct QPSK distribution
