= NMTV =

NMTV may refer to:

- Norwegian Mobile TV, a DMB broadcaster in Norway
- North Metro TV, television station in Minnesota
- Inner Mongolia Radio and Television, broadcaster in Inner Mongolia, China
