= Digital tuner =

Digital tuner may refer to one of several types of tuner designed to receive digitally-encoded radio or television transmissions, or which incorporate some form of digital electronics.

== Television ==
- Set-top box, a separate tuner for TV transmissions, of which both digital and analogue versions exist
  - ATSC tuner, for reception of ATSC digital television as used in North America, parts of Central America and South Korea
  - DVB, another digital broadcast standard
  - ISDB digital television reception

== Radio ==
- Digital radio
  - Digital Audio Broadcasting (DAB)
  - HD Radio
  - 5G Broadcast
  - ISDB digital radio reception
- DSP radio, a receiver for traditional FM and AM transmissions which uses digital signal processing technology in place of analogue circuitry
