= Dynamic Resolution Adaptation =

Audio codec standard

Dynamic Resolution Adaptation (DRA) was an audio encoding specification developed by DigiRise Technology. It had been selected as the Chinese national audio coding standard, and declared suitable for China Multimedia Mobile Broadcasting and DVB-H as addressed in the International Journal of Digital Multimedia Broadcasting.

The format was recognised by the CTA EDID Timing Extension Block standard (used by many A/V interfaces) and the Blu-ray Disc specification, introduced with Blu-ray Disc 2.3. There were no discs released with DRA audio, though there were expected to be such discs for the Chinese market but did not happen.
