= S-DMB =

Defunct digital satellite TV standard for mobile phones

S-DMB (Satellite-DMB) was a hybrid version of the Digital Multimedia Broadcasting. The S-DMB used the S band (2170-2200 MHz) of IMT-2000. and delivered around 18 channels at 128 kbit/s in 15 MHz. It incorporated a high power geostationary satellite, the MBSat 1 (since 2013, sold to Asia Broadcasting Satellite (ABS) of China). For outdoor and light indoor coverage is integrated with a terrestrial repeater (low power gap-filler) network for indoor coverage in urban areas.

A similar architecture is also used in XM Satellite Radio, Sirius Satellite Radio, DVB-SH and ETSI Satellite Digital Radio (SDR).

== S-DMB deployment ==
On May 1, 2005 South Korea became the first country in the world to start S-DMB service. The service provider was TU Media, subsidiary of SK Telecom. The same satellite and system was used in Japan on the defunct MobaHo! service (2004–2009) of Mobile Broadcasting Corporation (MBCO).

== S-DMB Supported Devices ==
Samsung (Anycall)

- All the SCH-B Series. (E.g., SCH-B500, SCH-B540, SCH-B600, SCH-B890)
- SCH-W920
- SCH-M495 (Omnia)

Pantech (SKY)

- IM-U140

LG (CYON)

- SB310, SB210, SH150

Motorola

- ZN40

== S-DMB Channels ==
- Video Channels contain about 20 channels featuring news, sports, movies, animations, dramas, and educational programs. (E.g. CNN, National Geographic Channels, BBC.)
- Audio Channels contain about 13 various channels including English channels. Sound quality is near CD quality at AAC 128 kbit/s.
- Extra 2 Pay Per View (PPV) channels for movies and adult channel.

== See also ==
- TU Media (The First S-DMB Provider In South Korea)
- DAB (Digital Audio Broadcasting)
- DMB (Digital Multimedia Broadcasting)
- DRM (Digital Radio Mondiale)
- MediaFLO
- CMMB (China Multimedia Mobile Broadcasting)
- MobaHo!
- Multimedia Broadcast Multicast Service
- Satellite radio
- Satellite television
- WiMAX
