= TDtv =

TDtv combines IPWireless commercial UMTS TD-CDMA solution and 3GPP Release 6 Multimedia Broadcast Multicast Service (MBMS) to deliver Mobile TV. TDtv operates in the universal unpaired 3G spectrum bands that are available worldwide at 1900 MHz and 2100 MHz. It allows UMTS operators to fully utilize their existing spectrum and base stations to offer mobile TV and multimedia packages without affecting other voice and data 3G services.
