= Broadcast and Multicast Service =

Interface in CDMA mobile networks

Broadcast and Multicast Service (BCMCS) is an interface for providing broadcast and multicast services in 3GPP2 CDMA2000 mobile networks. BCMCS can be used to transfer light video and audio clips or other data to a large group of mobile subscribers in an efficient manner. To do so, BCMCS is a so-called point-to-multipoint service. This means that multiple users receive the same information using the same radio resources.

== Usage of BCMCS ==
BCMCS can be used for two different kinds of services. Broadcast services in which all users within the broadcasting area can receive the same information and a multicast services in which only users that have subscribed to the service can receive the information Although BCMCS can be used for mobile TV, it has some limitations in the capacity that can be used for this kind of service within the network.

== Enhanced Broadcast and Multicast Services ==
EBCMCS is an enhanced version of BCMCS. EBCMCS uses a new radio interface based on OFDM to combat problems with echoes (multipath) in the transmission.

== See also ==
- Multimedia Broadcast Multicast Service (MBMS), a point-to-multipoint service defined for 3GPP systems
