= Landline =

Telephone service provided via wire or cable

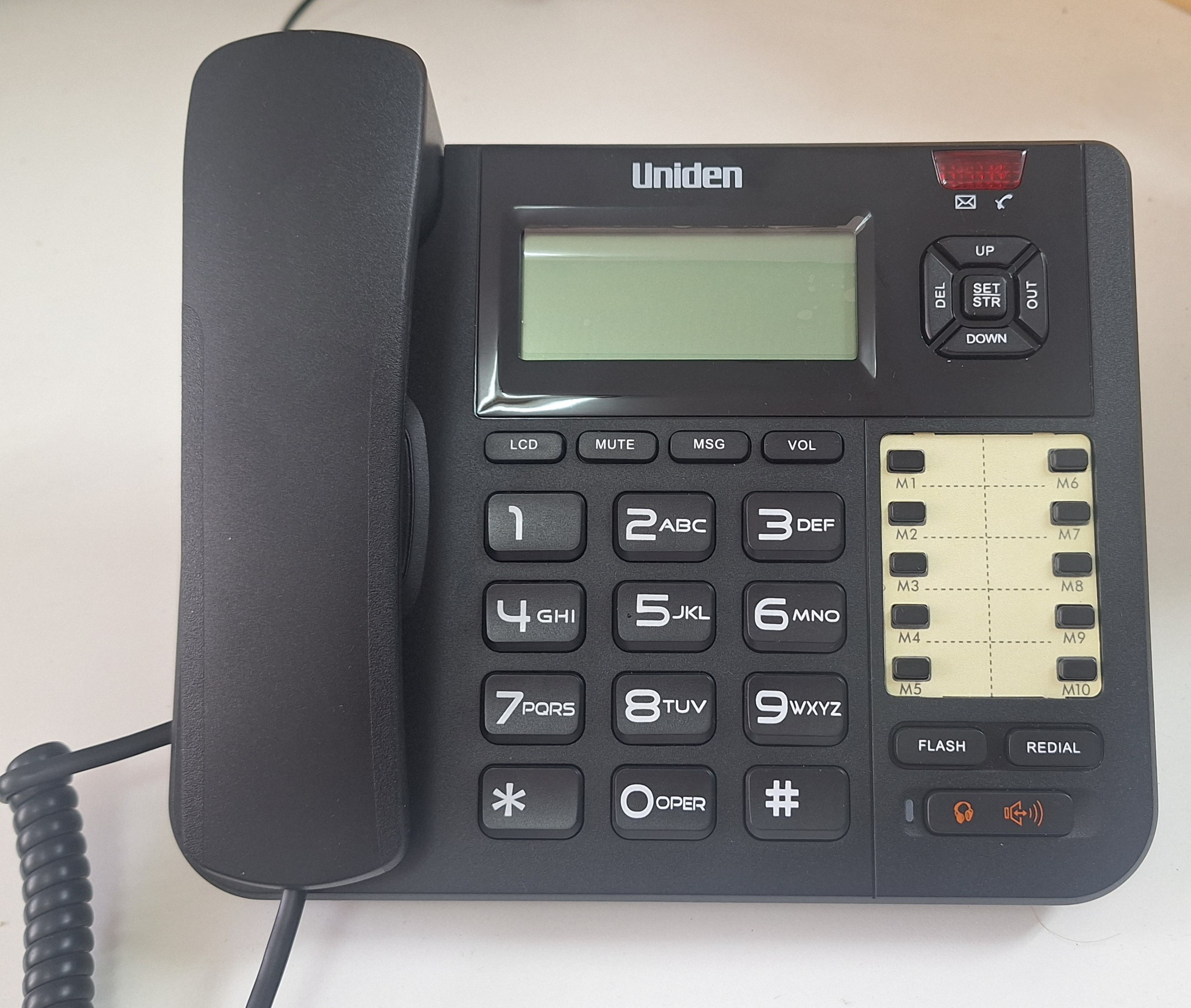
A landline telephone device

A landline, or fixed line, is a telephone service provided to a subscriber via cable or wire, i.e. metal conductors or optical fiber. The term differentiates a telephone service from the now ubiquitous Wireless service. It is loosely described as plain old telephone service (POTS).

Landline services are traditionally provided via the outside plant of a telephone company, consisting of analogue copper wire originating from a telephone company's central office, or wirecenter. Landline service often includes services that use Internet Protocol via broadband services.

The outside plant comprises tiers of cabling between distribution points in the exchange area, so that a single pair of copper wire, or an optical fiber, reaches each subscriber location, such as a home or office, at the network interface. Customer premises wiring extends from the network interface ("NID") to the location of one or more telephones inside the premises. A landline can carry high-speed internet such as digital subscriber line (DSL) which links back to the digital subscriber line access multiplexer (DSLAM) within the central office, T-1/T-3, or ISDN.

Subscribers' telephone sets connected to a landline may have a hard-wired handset, or it may be a cordless telephone; in either case it typically refers to the operation in relatively fixed locations, such as a residence or office. Wired handset landline telephones do not require mains electricity to work.

== Usage and statistics ==
In 2003, the CIA World Factbook reported approximately 1.263 billion main telephone lines worldwide. China had more than any other country, at 350 million, and the United States was second with 268 million. The United Kingdom had 23.7 million residential fixed home telephones.

A 2013 International Telecommunication Union report showed that the total number of fixed-telephone subscribers in the world was about 1.26 billion.

In many parts of the world, including Africa and India, the growth in mobile phone usage has outpaced that of landlines. In the United States, while 45.9 percent of households still had landlines as of 2017, more than half had only mobile phones. This trend is similar in Canada, where more than one in five households used mobile phones as their only source for telephone service in 2013. However, voice over IP (VoIP) services offer an alternative to traditional landlines, allowing numbers to remain in use without being tied to a physical location, making them more adaptable to modern ways of working. The FCC maintains both landline and Voice over IP subscriber numbers to monitor long-term trends in usage.

Landline phone subscriptions

Landline internet subscriptions

== Successors ==
Voice Over IP services can host landline numbers previously hosted on traditional fixed telephone networks. VoIP services can be used anywhere an Internet connection is available on many devices including smartphones, giving great flexibility to where calls may be answered and thus facilitating remote, mobile and home working, for example. VoIP porting allows landline numbers to remain in use, whilst freeing them from actual landlines tied to one location.

=== 2000s ===
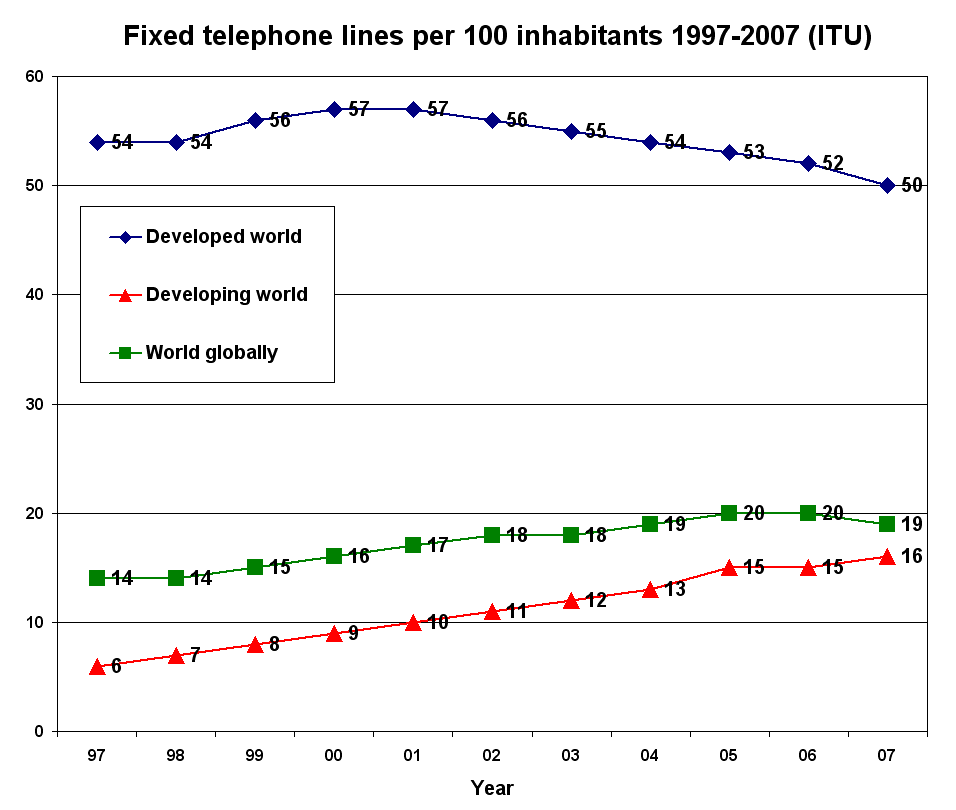
Global fixed telephone lines per 100 inhabitants (1997–2007)

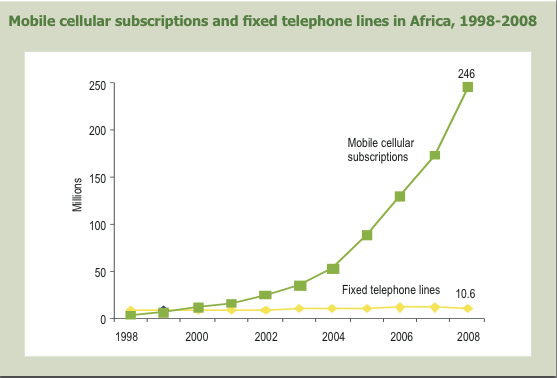
Total landline vs. mobile phones in Africa (1998–2008)

In many countries, landline service has not been readily available to most people. In some countries in Africa, the rise in cell phones has outpaced growth in landline service. Between 1998 and 2008, Africa added only 2.4 million landlines. In contrast, between 2000 and 2008, cell phone use rose from fewer than 2 in 100 people to 33 out of 100. There has also been a substantial decline of landline phones in the Indian subcontinent, in urban and even more in rural areas.

In the early 21st century, installations of landline telephones has declined due to the advancement of mobile network technology and the obsolescence of copper wire networking. It is more difficult to install landline copper wires to every user than it is to install transmission towers for mobile service that many people can connect to. Some predict that these metallic networks will be deemed completely out of date and replaced by more efficient broadband and fiber optic landline connections extending to rural areas and places where telecommunication was much more sparse. In 2009, The Economist wrote: "At current rates the last landline in America will be disconnected sometime in 2025."

In 2004, only about 45% of people in the United States between the ages of 12 and 17 owned cell phones. At that time, most had to rely on landline telephones. Just 4 years later, that percentage climbed to about 71%. That same year, 2008, about 77% of adults owned a mobile phone.

=== 2010s ===
In the year 2013, 91% of adults in the United States owned a mobile phone. Almost 60% of those with a mobile had a smartphone. A National Health Interview Survey of 19,956 households by the Centers for Disease Control and Prevention released May 4, 2017 showed 45.9% of U.S. households still had landlines, while 50.8% had only cell phones. Over 39% had both.

In Canada, more than one in five households use cell phones as their only source for telephone service. In 2013, statistics showed that 21% of households claimed to only use cellular phones. Households that are owned by members under the age of 35 have a considerably higher percentage of exclusive cell phone use. In 2013, 60% of young household owners claimed to only use cell phones. In 2019, 54% of Canadian households and 86.4% of German households had a landline telephone.

=== 2020s ===
In June 2020, it was reported that 60% of Australian adults used only mobile phones, with no landline. In 2021, only 14.5% of Australian and 29.4% of American households used landline at home. In contrast, 73% of UK households still had a landline connection in 2020 though this could be in part explained by broadband packaging practices. In 2022, 82.9% of German households had at least one landline phone while 73% of U.S. households had only a cell phone, 25% had a landline and cell service, and 1% had only a landline.

As of 2023, Estonia and the Netherlands have retired the legacy parts of the public switched telephone network (PSTN). In the United Kingdom, the analogue copper landline network is due to be terminated in 2027 (delayed from the original 2025 plan). The VoIP replacement is known as "Digital Voice" (on a BT service) in the UK. France, Germany and Japan are also in the process of replacing theirs.

Using primarily 2023 data, the CIA World Factbook reported approximately 849 million landlines worldwide.

== See also ==
- Basic exchange telecommunications radio service
- Plain old telephone service
- Local loop
- Last mile
- Field telephone
