= SPB =

SPB may refer to:

== Places ==
- Saint Petersburg, Russia
- Saint Paul's Bay, Malta
- South Park Blocks, a public park in Portland, Oregon

== Science and technology ==
- Shortest Path Bridging in the IEEE 802.1aq standard
- Slowly pulsating B star, a type of variable star
- Spindle pole body, the functional equivalent of the mammalian centriole in yeast
- Superpressure balloon

== Transportation ==
- Scappoose Industrial Airpark, Oregon, USA, FAA LID
- Schynige Platte Bahn, a mountain railway in Switzerland
- Charlotte Amalie Harbor Seaplane Base, U.S. Virgin Islands, IATA airport code SPB
- Shepherd's Bush railway station, London, National Rail station code SPB

== Other uses ==
- Society of the Precious Blood, Anglican religious order
- Socialist Party of Bangladesh, Political party in Bangladesh
- S. P. Balasubrahmanyam (1946–2020), Indian playback singer, actor, music director, voice actor and film producer
- SPB Software, mobile software developer
- Belarus Free Trade Union, a trade union in Belarus
- State Procurement Board in South Australia
- Sparisjóðabanki, also known as SPB hf., a defunct bank in Iceland
- SPB TV, a company
