= MobaHo! =

Defunct audio/video subscription service in Japan

MobaHO! (モバHO!) was a mobile satellite digital audio/video subscription based broadcasting service in Japan, whose services began on October 20, 2004 and ended on March 31, 2009 at 3:00 pm Japan time. MobaHO! used the ISDB digital broadcast specification. The satellite, MBSat 1, providing this service was jointly owned by SK Telecom of South Korea and Mobile Broadcasting Corporation (MBCO) of Japan; TU, South Korea's now defunct S-DMB mobile television service under SK Telecom, used to share same satellite.

A number of receivers were available for this service: portable receivers with built-in QVGA LCD screens, car-use, a laptop-use PC card receiver, a mobile phone (by DoCoMo) and more.

== Satellite ==
The service used the MBSat 1 (Mobile Broadcasting Satellite, also known as Hanbyul, COSPAR 2004-007A) satellite. The satellite was a joint venture of SK Telecom of South Korea and Mobile Broadcasting Corporation of Japan. The satellite was launched 13.03.2004 on an Atlas IIIA rocket. It was a Geostationary orbit (GEO) satellite, located at 120 degrees West.

The broadcasting of the satellite ceased 31 March 2009.

After the bankruptcy of MobaHO!, the satellite was sold to Asia Broadcasting Satellite (ABS) of China in 2013 and moved to 75 degrees East and renamed ABS 2i. Later it was named ABS 4 (Mobisat).

== Technical information ==
This service used ISO MPEG-4 Version 1 Simple Profile @ L3 video and AAC audio encapsulated in MPEG transport stream. The maximum supported resolution was 320x240 pixels (QVGA), and the maximum video bitrate was 384 kbit/s at a frame rate of 15 frames per second. Audio conformed to the ISO/IEC 13818-7 AAC LC (Low Complexity) profile, with maximum bitrate of 144 kbit/s and sampling rates up to 48 kHz. The transmission was scrambled using the MULTI2 cipher for conditional access.

This service was broadcast over 2.6 GHz S-band by MBSat at 144.0°E. Left Circular polarized beam covered Japan, while Right Circular polarized beam covered South Korea. These beams were intended to be received by portable devices with omni-directional antennas. A single 150 W Ku band transponder on MBSat, operated at 12.226 GHz and Symbol rate of 18433 was used to broadcast identical contents to "Gap-fillers" (re-transmission devices) which were planned to be installed in train stations and subways, and other areas where the S-band satellite beam would not reach. This repeater broadcast was also scrambled using MULTI2.

== Financial issues ==
The company had expected to attract a million subscribers by 2008, but had only reached about a hundred thousand. The company ceased operations on March 31, 2009.

== Receiver devices ==
MTV-S10 by Toshiba, 4E-MB1 by SHARP, MBR0101B by MBCO, MBT0102A by MBCO - PC card type. This was the only device which allowed recording broadcasts. However, DRM technology was used to prohibit playback of recorded content without the receiver card present. Hardware encryption chip and presumably receiver serial number was used to encrypt the recording.

- Mobile phone: Music Porter X by DoCoMo
- and more

== Program Channels ==
MobaHO! broadcast eight video channels to its subscribers, as well as a wide array of audio channels.

Most MobaHO! music channels were produced in-house and featured popular genre in the Japanese and Korean languages for their respective markets. They also carried several commercial and non-commercial FM stations from the west coast of the United States for English language, American Pop, Hip-Hop, Jazz, and various forms of old and new Rock. Toward the end, they also carried New York City's WQXR, America's highest rated Classical music station, then owned by The New York Times.

With a licensed bandwidth equal to that of both Sirius and XM, MobaHO! was able to offer approximately thirty predominantly music, audio channels plus seven video channels, including news, horse racing, and family and children's programming.

== See also ==
- Satellite - Digital Multimedia Broadcasting (S-DMB)
- ISDB
