= Rebellions (company) =

South Korean technology company

Rebellions Inc.

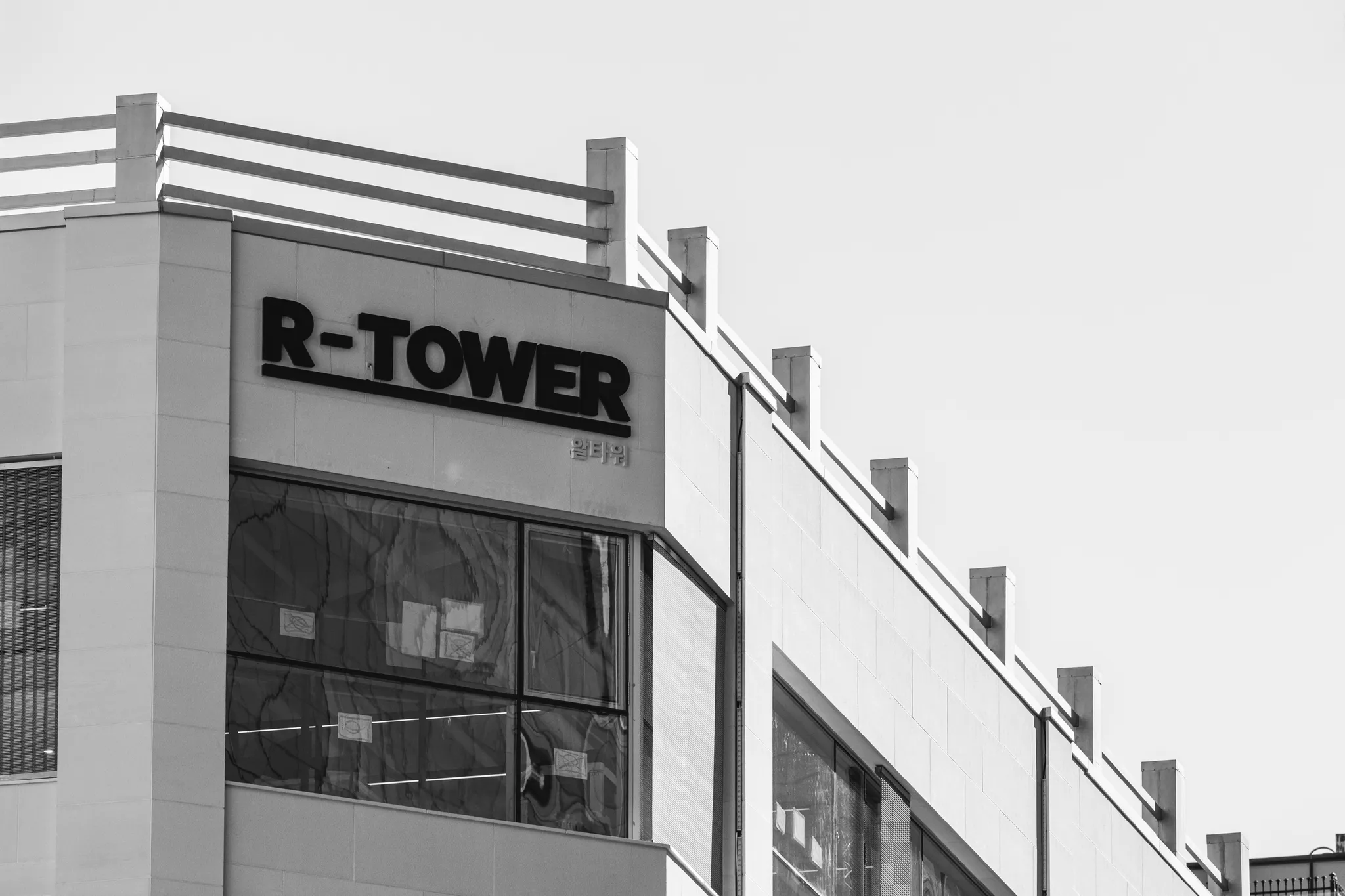
- Headquarters in Seongnam, South Korea
- Type: Private
- Industry: Semiconductors
- Founded: September 2020; 6 years ago
- Founder: Park Sunghyun; Oh Jinwook; Kim Hyo-Eun; Shin Sung-ho
- Headquarters: Seongnam, South Korea
- Area served: Worldwide
- Key people: Park Sung-hyun (CEO); Oh Jin-wook (CTO)
- Number of employees: 224 (FY25)
- Website: rebellions.ai

Rebellions Inc. (Korean: 리벨리온) headquartered in Seongnam, South Korea, is a fabless semiconductor company founded in 2020. It develops artificial intelligence (AI) chips, compilers, and system software, with a particular focus on neural processing units (NPUs) optimized for AI Inference.

The company's chips are designed for high energy efficiency, delivering stronger performance per watt than conventional graphics processing units (GPUs) for inference workloads. Rebellions provides full-stack solutions covering hardware, software, and systems, allowing data centers and cloud providers to run large language models and other AI applications with lower power consumption and operating costs.

Following a merger with SAPEON Korea, the company became South Korea's first "unicorn" in the AI chips industry. Rebellions' NPUs have been commercially deployed at KT Cloud, the first cloud provider in South Korea to offer public NPU-based services using the company's ATOM processors. SK Telecom uses Rebellions hardware for AI services such as call summarization on its 'A.' platform and is evaluating the chips in its NPU farm. Other customers include LG Electronics.

== History ==
Rebellions was founded in September 2020 by five co-founders, including CEO Sunghyun Park, CTO Jinwook Oh, and CPO Hyo-Eun Kim.

Sunghyun Park, the company’s co-founder and CEO, studied electronic engineering at KAIST before completing a Ph.D. at the Massachusetts Institute of Technology (MIT) between 2009 and 2014. After graduating, he worked at Intel Labs, Samsung (USA), SpaceX (as a Starlink ASIC design engineer), and Morgan Stanley. While at Morgan Stanley, he developed AI-based systems for high-frequency trading. The experience led him to explore specialized AI chips for financial applications; following the emergence of large language models (LLMs), the company pivoted toward general-purpose AI inference accelerators.

Jinwook Oh, the company’s chief technology officer (CTO), earned his master’s and doctoral degrees from KAIST. Prior to co-founding Rebellions, he spent seven years at IBM’s T.J. Watson Research Center, where he worked as a lead architect for AI semiconductor design.

As of March 2026, Rebellions had raised approximately 1.3 trillion won in cumulative funding, the largest amount among South Korean AI semiconductor startups.

In March 2026, the company was selected as the first recipient of direct investment from the National Growth Fund under the South Korean government’s “K-NVIDIA” initiative. It completed a pre-IPO funding round of 640 billion won at a valuation of 3.4 trillion won.

Rebellions has also attracted strategic investments from overseas investors. In July 2024, it received 20 billion won from Wa’ed Ventures, the venture capital arm of Saudi Aramco, becoming the first Korean startup in Asia to secure investment from the firm. The company also received investment from Arm, reported as the first Asia-Pacific startup to do so.

Domestically, Rebellions is the only AI semiconductor startup to have received investment from both major telecommunications companies (SK Telecom and KT) but also from core semiconductor industry players including SK Hynix and Samsung Electronics. Additional strategic investments have come from international venture capital firms such as Japan’s DG Daiwa Ventures and France’s Korelya Capital.

Although Park considered starting the company in the United States, he chose to found it in South Korea to leverage the country’s semiconductor ecosystem and engineering talent.

In January 2024, Rebellions raised US$124 million in a Series B funding round led by South Korean telecom company KT.

In December 2024, Rebellions merged with Sapeon Korea, the AI chip subsidiary of SK Telecom.

In September 2025, Rebellions raised US$250 million in a Series C round at a valuation of US$1.4 billion, with participation from Arm and Samsung.

In March 2026, the company completed a US$400 million pre-IPO funding round led by Mirae Asset Financial Group and the Korea National Growth Fund, valuing Rebellions at approximately US$2.34 billion. This brought the company’s total funding to US$850 million.

== Products ==
Rebellions develops AI inference accelerators and delivers them as full-stack solutions in the form of PCIe cards, servers, and rack-scale systems, rather than selling bare chips.

=== ATOM series ===
ATOM is Rebellions’ first-generation neural processing unit (NPU), designed specifically for AI inference workloads with an emphasis on energy efficiency.

- Manufactured on Samsung’s 5 nm process.
- A single ATOM chip delivers approximately 32 TFLOPS (FP16) and 128 TOPS (INT8), with 16 GB of GDDR6 memory (256 GB/s bandwidth) and a relatively low thermal design power (typically 60–150 W depending on configuration).
- ATOM-Max is a multi-chip PCIe card that integrates four ATOM dies plus a controller. It offers significantly higher performance (around 128 TFLOPS FP16) and greater memory capacity/bandwidth while remaining more power-efficient than comparable GPU solutions.

=== REBEL100 ===
Rebel100 is Rebellions’ second-generation, high-performance NPU designed for large-scale language model (LLM) and multimodal inference in data centers.

Key specifications and features include:

- Manufactured on Samsung’s 4 nm process
- Chiplet-based design connecting multiple dies
- Peak performance: 2 PFLOPS (FP8) / 1 PFLOPS (FP16)
- Memory: 144 GB HBM3e with 4.8 TB/s bandwidth, plus 512 MB of high-speed on-chip SRAM
- Supports UCIe-Advanced interconnect for high-bandwidth chip-to-chip communication
- Optimized for large models, including Mixture-of-Experts (MoE) architectures

Rebel100 is offered through product lines such as RebelCard (accelerator cards), RebelServer, and upcoming rack-scale solutions (RebelRack / RebelPOD). The company emphasizes that the platform is built for inference from the ground up (rather than adapted from training-oriented GPUs) and provides strong performance-per-watt and performance-per-dollar characteristics.

The software stack supports popular open-source inference frameworks such as vLLM and Triton, aiming for relatively easy migration from existing GPU environments.
