= Open Mobile Video Coalition =

The Open Mobile Video Coalition (OMVC) is a consortium founded to advance free broadcast mobile television in the United States. It was created by TV stations to promote the ATSC-M/H television standard to consumers, electronics manufacturers, the wireless industry, and the Federal Communications Commission.

The OMVC set-up the first real-life beta tests for ATSC-M/H on WATL and WPXA in Atlanta, and on KOMO and KONG in Seattle. Most recently, it has also advocated to the FCC, trying to keep it from taking even more of the UHF upper-band TV channels for wireless broadband. The OMVC commissioned a study to emphasize the fact that broadcasting is a far more efficient use of bandwidth than unicasting the same live video stream hundreds of times to every mobile phone that wants to watch local television.

As of January 1, 2013 the OMVC became integrated in the National Association of Broadcasters.
