= Mobibase =

Mobibase is a France-based company., publishing and distributing ethnic and thematic TV channels and VOD content to mobile publishers, operators, cable and satellite TV and IPTV/OTT services in Europe, the Americas, Middle East, and Africa

The company publishes linear TV channels on sports, news, cooking, lifestyle, cartoons, movies & series, music programming, and distribute live TV channels by satellite or IP capture.

Mobibase distributes linear and non linear content, providing solutions on content management, captation, encoding and the streaming on several devices: phones, tablets, computers, IPTV and Smart TV

== History ==
In 2002, Vincent Roger and Laurent Sarver creates Mobibase company in Paris, France, starting by the aggregation of the content for mobile download services (wallpaper, screensaver, animations and casual mobile games).
In 2006, the company develops a streaming platform designed to program, transcode and stream to mobile and web TV. Mobibase launches its first package One TV Plus in France edited for mobile television. One TV Plus package includes 24 channels on several thematics (fun, movie, news music, glamour, etc.) and takes part of Orange, SFR, Bouygues channels offering.
In 2007, the company publishes its first thematic TV channels on mobile.
In 2013, Mobibase provides worldwide thematic TV and VOD services on multiple devices.
In 2017, Mobibase distributes 200 TV channels and 7000+ video on demand through its catalog offer. Mobibase provides a variety of packages such as Hispanic, Arabic, Turkish, Indian, Italian, Russian, Sports and News.

== Activity ==
Mobibase's TV channels are declared to the French TV Regulation Authority, Conseil Supérieur de l'Audiovisuel(CSA) and in the database on TV and on-demand audiovisual services and companies in Europe. The channels' brand are registered at Institut National de la Propriété Industrielle (INPI).

== Broadcasting Ecosystem ==
=== Content creation ===
The first element in the broadcasting ecosystem is the creation of audiovisual content. Broadcast content is offered to users in terms of a broadcast service, bundled and offered as a package. The major part of broadcast services are radio shows, movies, documentaries, news for radio, TV programmes, etc. However, it may also contain new types of content emerged with the advent of Internet such as websites, blogs, social media appearance. The broadcast services includes linear and nonlinear content. Linear content refers to the traditional way of offering radio or TV services with scheduled sequence of content over a certain period of time. This type of content are set up by broadcasters and cannot be changed by a listener or a viewer - the last ones can only change from one service to another or to switch off if the programme is not attractive. A live stream on the Internet is to be considered as a linear, as well. Nonlinear content are time-shifted and catch-up services available for a certain period of time. The viewer can select individual pieces of content and control the timing and the sequence of consumption. Other forms of nonlinear broadcast services encompass on demand access to audio and video content for immediate consumption and the viewer decides what to consume, where to consume it, when and on which device. Mobibase does not produce its own content but licence content rights acquired from a combination of international and local rights deals. Many major broadcasters which report under IFRS, including ITV, Channel 4, Sky, France24, TV Globo, teleSUR, RTL, Deutsche Well and Bell Media, explicitly highlight acquiring programming rights as a key driver of revenue growth. Acquired programming rights can be for single or multiple broadcasts and can have licence periods spanning away years. The agreements may also specify format (HD, 3D) and geographical rights. Programming rights agreements also cover other platforms such as desktop computer, tablet and smartphone.

=== Content distribution ===
Another important element in broadcasting ecosystem is the content distribution. Broadcasters distribute their content over several networks (terrestrial, cable, satellite, broadband networks, etc.) moving toward complete digital broadcasting. The content market is characterised by the multi-platform environment through which content is available to end users. There is a distinction between offline content (e.g. content delivered via traditional broadcasting platforms) and online content(e.g. video on demand).

== See also ==
- Mobile TV
- Mobile content
- IPTV
- Internet television
- Over-the-top content
- Telco-OTT
- Content delivery network
