= Channel 55 =

Channel 55 refers to several television stations.

In System M and System N countries, channel 55 is allocated to UHF frequencies covering 717.25-721.75 MHz. In the United States and Canada, the bandwidth used by channel 55 has been reallocated for wireless communication use, with its use for television broadcasting being phased out. This frequency was formerly in use by MediaFLO, a US system developed by Qualcomm to send video and media to mobile devices, which was discontinued in February 2011, with the bandwidth sold by Qualcomm where possible to AT&T Mobility for wireless communications.

== Canada ==
The following television station broadcasts on analog channel 55 in Canada:

The following television station operates on virtual channel 55 in Canada:

- CICO-DT-92 in Cloyne, Ontario

== Other countries ==
- Canal 55 El Líder, a television station in León, Nicaragua

== See also ==
- Channel 55 virtual TV stations in the United States
