= SK Telecom =

South Korean telecommunications company

SK Telecom Co., Ltd. 에스케이텔레콤주식회사
- Type: Public
- Traded as: KRX: 017670; NYSE: SKM
- Industry: Telecommunications
- Founded: April 20, 1984; 42 years ago (as Korea Mobile Telecommunications); 1997; 29 years ago (as SK Telecom)
- Headquarters: Jung District, Seoul, South Korea
- Area served: South Korea
- Key people: Young Sang Ryu (CEO)
- Products: Wireless telecom Cellular internet Internet; Mobile platform Internet of things
- Revenue: ▲ ₩17.95 trillion = US$ 12.15 billion (2024, consolidated)
- Number of employees: 40,543
- Parent: SK Inc.
- Subsidiaries: see this list
- Website: sktelecom.com

SK Telecom Co., Ltd., abbreviated as SKT (Korean: SK텔레콤 or 에스케이텔레콤), is a South Korean wireless telecommunications operator and former film distributor and is part of the SK Group, one of the country's largest chaebols. It leads the local market with 50.5 percent share as of 2008. SK Telecom is the largest wireless carrier in South Korea, with 23 million subscribers as of Q4 2023.

Since its creation in 1984, the company has evolved from a first generation analog cellular system, to second generation CDMA, then to the world's first third-generation synchronized IMT-2000 cellular system. SK Telecom also became the world's first carrier to commercialize HSDPA in May 2006. SK expanded into the landline market by acquiring second-rated fixed-line operator Hanaro Telecom in February 2008.

The company's online brands include Nate, a web portal, June, a mobile multimedia service, Moneta, an e-banking mobile app, Nate Drive, a telematics service, and Digital Home, an online interface to remote-control household appliances.

In 2004, SK Telecom launched Hanbyul, the world's first DMB satellite. TU Media, SK Telecom's digital media arm, handles DMB TV broadcasts.

In November 2015, SK Telecom announced signing a deal to acquire CJ HelloVision, the country's largest cable and Internet operator, with the view to merge it with its own cable unit, SK Broadband. The acquisition, which will make SK Broadband the second largest cable broadcaster following KT, is opposed by competitors, who charge that the merger will help SK unfairly dominate the market.

== History ==
SK Telecom was established in March 1984 under the name Korea Mobile Telecommunications Services Corp. (KMTSC; Korean: 한국 이동 통신 서비스), but was renamed Korea Mobile Telecommunications Corp. (KMTC; Korean: 한국 이동 통신) in May 1988. It was a subsidiary of the state monopoly phone company, Korea Telecom (now known as KT Corp.) until KT sold it off in 1994. In June 1994 SK Group (Formerly Sunkyong Group) became Korea Mobile Telecommunications Corporation's largest shareholder. KMTC officially joined the SK Group in January 1997 and changed its name to SK Telecom in March of that year.

In October 2000, SK Telecom became the second operator in the world after NTT DoCoMo to launch a commercial 3G service using W-CDMA technology. In January 2002, this was followed up by launching the world's first CDMA2000 1xEV-DO network, offering greatly increased data transmission speeds to preexisting 2G networks.

In May 2005, SK Telecom divested 60 percent of SK Teletech stock to cellphone maker Pantech. SK remains the second largest shareholder by holding on to the rest of Teletech's stock. In 2006, the well-known "SKY" brand of mobile devices became fully owned by Pantech as it finalized its takeover of SK Teletech.

=== 1984–1993: early years ===
Founded on March 29, 1984, as Korea Mobile Telecommunications Services Corp., the state-owned carrier introduced pagers and car phones to the Korean market. May 1984 saw the launch of the car phone service. Korea Mobile changed its name to Korea Mobile Telecommunications Corp. (KMTC) in May 1988. In July, AMPS cellular network was initially launched in Seoul metropolitan area. By 1991 nationwide coverage was complete.

In April 1993, the South Korean government, through KMTC, adopted CDMA as the national cellular telephone system.

=== 1994–1996: privatization and the CDMA standard ===
Through privatization, SK Group became Korea Mobile Telecommunications Corp.'s largest shareholder in June 1994.
In October 1994, Korea's first CDMA system was introduced to the public for the first time.

In January 1995, KMTC reached the one million subscriber mark. Korea Mobile Telecommunications became the third Korean firm to be listed on the NYSE exchange (ADR) in June 1996. Later that year South Korea got its first commercial CDMA (IS-95A) network. Operating in Seoul in October, it is considered one of the world's earliest commercial CDMA networks.

=== 1997–2000: international expansion ===
SK Group completed its takeover of KMTC in January 1997, as it became the world's sixth carrier to attain ten million subscriptions. Around that time, it also began constructing the Northeast Asian CDMA belt encompassing China, Japan, Vietnam, and the rest of the Asian continent.

In March 1997, to reflect new changes, KMTC changed its name to SK Telecom, and in October, NetsGo, an online service, was launched.

In June 1998, SK Telink, the international call service division, started offering commercial overseas call service. In December 1998, SK Teletech launched its first handset. In April 1999, SK Telecom entered the Mongolian market by co-founding Skytel LLC with nearly 30 percent ownership stake.
TTL, a wireless plan targeting younger users, and nTOP, a cellular internet service were launched in July and October 1999, respectively.
In December 1999, SK Telecom surpassed ten million subscriber mark, the following month, it launched the world's first commercial CDMA2000 service. By the end of the year the carrier won a contract for asynchronous IMT-2000 (WCDMA) facility.

=== 2001–2007: cellular internet and market accrual ===
The new millennium ushered in an era of cross-platform online networks that saw efforts to integrate mobile services, as SK Telecom was exploring new value-creating models such as m-Commerce and satellite DMB Service.

In January 2002, an acquisition of Shinsegi Telecomm Inc. was completed. In the same month also, the company deployed world's first commercial synchronous IMT-2000 facility. In March 2002, the carrier struck international roaming deals between countries using CDMA and GSM networks. An agreement was signed with Israel's Pele-Phone in April to sell proprietary software that will operate on the carrier's existing CDMA network and future 1x-CDMA network. In July, a MoU was signed with China Unicom to establish a joint venture. In November two mobile applications 'June' and 'Moneta' were launched. In July 2003, S-Fone, a commercial CDMA network became operative in Vietnam. In August 2003, June became the world's first 3G service to have one million subscribers.

In February 2004, SK won a contract for a joint venture with China Unicom, called UNISK. In March 2004, Hanbyul, the world's first DMB satellite, was launched. MelOn, an online music store was launched in November 2004. '1mm' and 'Loview,' a digital photo frame service were launched in April and November 2005, respectively. By December, MelOn had four million subscribers.

SK Telecom started 2006 with record revenues of ₩10 trillion (equivalent to ₩15.33 trillion or US$11.44 billion in 2025). In May the world's first commercial HSDPA handset was released. May also saw the carrier's entry into the U.S. wireless communication market with Helio. In June, SK Telecom signed a strategic partnership with China Unicom to purchase CB worth $1 billion in its subsidiary, China Unicom Hong Kong. In the same month SK deployed its WiBro internet network. In April 2007, a project to create TD-SCDMA, China's 3G wireless broadband equivalent was signed with the Chinese government. Around that time, S-Fone had two million subscribers in Vietnam.

=== 2008–present: landline and new technologies ===
In November 2008, SK signed an agreement to buy a controlling stake of fixed-line phone company Hanaro Telecom for ₩1.09 trillion (equivalent to ₩1.56 trillion or US$1.16 billion in 2025) from a consortium led by AIG and Newbridge Capital. The new entity will be the second-largest telecom firm in terms of total assets and revenues next to KT Corp.

In 2013 SK Telecom was the world's first operator to offer a commercial LTE-Advanced network under the brand name bandLTE. This coincided with the release of the Samsung Galaxy S4 LTE-A model, which offered a step-up CPU (Snapdragon 800 vs. Snapdragon 600 used in the regular model) and also LTE-Advanced capabilities. SK Telecom supported this handset at launch. On July 6, 2013, it was reported that Apple was in talks with SK Telecom to release the iPhone 5s model on SK's LTE Advanced network.

On December 17, 2018, SK Telecom introduced the 'baro' roaming plan which offers unlimited use of international roaming voice calls. As of June 2019, 'baro' has drawn 2.2 million customers and 38 million total calls (with a total of 800,000 hours of voice calls). It also won the 'Best Mobile Technology Breakthrough in Asia' award at the 2019 Asia Mobile Awards carried as section of MWC19 Shanghai. In June 2019, SK Telecom announced the launching of the world's first 5G roaming service partnering with Swisscom. In October 2020, SK Telecom formed a partnership with Uber Technologies, with a plan to break off mobility operation into a subsidiary called T Map Mobility. In November 2021, SK Telecom spun off of a new company focusing on investments, semiconductors and ICT, SK Square.

=== Cybersecurity breach of 2021-2025 ===
On April 18, 2025, SK Telecom informed authorities of a data leak, with full scope of the leak being unknown at the time. The information leaked in this incident includes the USIM authentication key (KI), International Mobile Subscriber Identity (IMSI), device identifier (IMEI), and phone numbers.

In response to the breach, SK announced that all of its 23 million subscribers would be eligible for a free USIM card replacement starting from April 28, a week after the company publicly acknowledged the hack. Those who replaced their USIM earlier would be eligible for a refund. However, SK Telecom currently has only 1 million USIM cards available, leading to shortages and customer frustrations. Acting President Han Duck-soo directed related agencies to investigate SK Telecom's hacking countermeasures. SK said they are developing a way to format USIM cards without physically replacing them.

In July 2025, Korean Ministry of Science and ICT released a final report of the investigation. Based on the report, SK Telecom was compromised back in 2021 with attackers remaining active in SKT network undetected until 2025. According to the report, SK Telecom failed to properly manage sensitive accounts, encrypt sensitive data and did not respond adequately to previous security breaches (according to the report, SK Telecom detected unauthorized reboot of one of the servers, detected malware but did not inform the authorities), did not store critical security log information for sufficient time.

On August 28, 2025, the Personal Information Protection Commission issued a 134.8 billion won (US$96.9 million) fine on SK Telecom over the data breach.

== Corporate governance ==
As of April 6, 2023.

Shareholder	Stake (%)	Flag
SK Inc.	30.01%	South Korea
National Pension Service	7.74%	South Korea
Treasury Stock	0.37%	South Korea

== Services ==
As of August 2020, SK Telecom operates 2G IS-95/CDMA 2000, 3G WCDMA/HSPA+, 4G Mobile WiMAX, LTE, and 5G networks.

Frequencies used by SK Telecom's Network in Korea
Frequency	Frequency band	Frequency bandwidth (MHz)	Generation	Radio interface	Notes
2100 MHz Uplink: 1955–1960 Downlink: 2145–2150	1	2x5	3G	UMTS	
850 MHz Uplink: 829–839 Downlink: 874–884	5	2x10	4G	LTE	(main frequency)
1800 MHz Uplink: 1715–1725, 1730–1735 Downlink: 1810–1830	3	2x20	4G	LTE	
2100 MHz Uplink: 1940–1955 Downlink: 2130–2145	1	2x15	4G	LTE	
2600 MHz Uplink: 2500–2520 Downlink: 2620–2640	7	2x20	4G	LTE	
2600 MHz Uplink: 2540–2550 Downlink: 2660–2670	7	2x10	4G	LTE	
3500 MHz 3600–3700	n78	100	5G	NR	

The 2G network supports CDMA (IS-95A/B), CDMA2000, and EV-DO. EV-DO handsets are marked with its service name "June". The 3G network supports WCDMA, HSPA, and HSPA+. SK Telecom has the best HSPA+ coverage in South Korea. HSPA+ is available in 50+ major cities and towns, while KT HSPA+ is available in selected metropolitan areas. 3.9G LTE, which uses both band 5 and band 3, supports multi-carrier technology, which SK Telecom claims to be the first operator to offer.

From May 2005 to September 2012, SK Telecom provided S-DMB through its subsidiary TU Media (later SK Telink). S-DMB service was ceased in September 2012 after significant losses in its final years.

In 2022, SK Telecom announced a partnership with Joby Aviation with the goal to create a line of flying taxis for the South Korean market by 2025.

SK Telecom also provides online multiplatform entertainment, business and financial services:

- MelOn: Introduced in November 2004, MelOn is SK Telecom's music e-store, which allows users to download or stream music over the internet. Music can be played on mobile phones, digital audio players, portable media players and digital cameras. Users can create their own ringtones. In 2009, LOEN Entertainment, an SK Group record label, became the company-in-charge of running MelOn. An Indonesian version of MelOn was created in cooperation with PT Telkom Indonesia. Both MelOn and LOEN Entertainment was later owned by Kakao.
- m-Finance: an online banking system introduced in 2001, allows users to take charge of all their financial transactions. Properly equipped mobile phones can do basic banking such as wire transfers and checking balances as well as stock trading and credit card services. Users can also withdraw cash from ATMs using their phones.
- Digital Home: Digital Home allows users to control and monitor home appliances, lighting, security systems and fire alarms remotely. The service utilizes high-speed internet, telephone and cable networks to achieve functionality.
- Mobile RFID (m-RFID): Phones with embedded RF readers can give users key information about a product before making a purchase. SK Telecom has tested this technology for six applications including, safety, authentication, package tracking, supply chain management, digital content usage and location-based services.

== International markets ==
SK Telecom is currently putting its efforts in expanding into global markets, such as Vietnam, U.S., China and the Philippines. The company is also forging strategic alliances with other global carriers and IT businesses.

=== China ===
In 2000, SK Telecom first entered China, later forming a joint venture with China Unicom for wireless Internet service in February 2004. This joint venture between a foreign and local company, UNISK, is the first of its kind in China.

In 2006, SK Telecom bought $1 billion worth of convertible bonds of China Unicom Hong Kong, a division of China Unicom and agreed to cooperate in joint sourcing of handsets, development of additional services, platform development, marketing and distribution, customer relationship management, and network development. One result of this partnership is jointly developing handsets to be sourced by Samsung, LG, and Motorola.

In August 2006, SK Telecom signed an MoU making it the first non-Chinese company to participate in the TD-SCDMA Project. Under the agreement SK Telecom will work with China's National Development and Reform Commission (NDRC) on development of TD-SCDMA, China's 3G Internet standard equivalent.

=== United States ===
==== Helio ====
On January 26, 2005, SK Telecom announced that it had formed a $440 million joint venture with Earthlink to form a new U.S. cellular carrier named SK-Earthlink, later that year, the name was changed to Helio. Combined with Earthlink, Helio is expected to offer a variety of advanced mobile devices, many of which are already available in Korea. These models would be refined and updated for use by tech-savvy American consumers, allowing for the first time handsets with functionalities previously unavailable in the U.S. market.

The now-defunct venture operated on the premise of being a mobile virtual network operator (MVNO), using CDMA 1xEVDO network capacity leased from Sprint Nextel. In 2007, SK Telecom began talks to purchase a stake in Sprint Nextel, however by 2008 it had backed away from the deal.

On June 27, 2008, it was reported that Helio was being acquired in an all-stock deal by Virgin Mobile; for a net acquisition price of $39 million —–a far cry from the $500 million originally invested in the venture. All staff were eliminated and the business ceased as a going concern

==== Mobile Money Ventures ====
On March 6, 2008, SK Telecom launched Mobile Money Ventures, a joint venture with Citibank. On March 28, 2011, SK Telecom made a surprise bid to acquire bankrupt movie/game rental company Blockbuster Inc. SK bid $284.5 million for Blockbuster, but ended up losing to Dish Network.

==== SK Telecom Americas Innopartners ====
On March 4, 2014, SK Telecom announced that its U.S. arm, SK Telecom Americas, Inc. completed the establishment of the startup accelerator SK Telecom Americas Innopartners. The accelerator invests in early stage core technology startups. It is set up to incubate 11 startups at the same time, and currently is hosting three of them (Etopus, N43, Pavilion Data).

=== Vietnam ===
In September 2001, SK Telecom established S-Telecom, through a Business Cooperation Contract (BCC) with SPT (Saigon Postel), a Vietnamese phone company with a CDMA license.

S-Telecom, Vietnam's first CDMA wireless carrier, launched commercial services in July 2003 and has since upgraded its network to CDMA2000 1xEV-DO to meet growing demand. Currently 64 cities including Ho Chi Minh City and Hanoi are served under the S-Fone brand.

As of October 2006, the company was providing EV-DO wireless internet services in five major cities including Hanoi and Ho Chi Minh City. S-Fone subscribers reached two million in April 2007, a little over three years after its start.

=== Philippines ===
SK Telecom announced on October 28, 2019, that they will deploy 5G services in the Philippines, in partnership with Now Telecom.

== Subsidiaries ==
SK Telecom has a number of subsidiaries that support its growth. In 2006, SK Communications expanded into new markets with an enhanced version of Korea's leading social networking site Cyworld. At home, NateOn is the leading messenger service with more than 13 million users as of 2006. SK Telink, the international telephony division, launched international Korean SMS messaging in the U.S., today it operates in more than 170 countries. TU Media, the nationwide satellite Digital Multimedia Broadcasting (DMB) service, is also making fast growth, attracting over one million subscribers in 2006.

=== NetsGo ===
With Thrunet and Hanaro controlling nearly half of the growing high-speed Internet market, SK Telecom entered the market in late 1999 with Dream NetsGo, a cable Internet provider that offered its services in a partnership with local cable TV operator Dreamcity Media. It provided Internet access at a speed of up to 10 Mbit/s using the cable TV network, which had 120,000 subscribers at the time. In 2002 NetsGo merged with Lycos Korea to form SK Communications.

=== SK Broadband ===
Founded as Hanaro Telecom, Inc. in 1997 and was the only fixed-line and cable operator beside the state-owned KT. It provides local, domestic long-distance and international long-distance fixed-line telephone services to residential and commercial subscribers. After acquiring Thrunet, Korea's second-rated broadband company in 2005, Hanaro became a provider of broadband Internet access service and other Internet-related services, including video-on-demand and IPTV services. Other Internet-related businesses include intelligent network, Internet leased lines, domestic leased line, VPN, Internet data center, and CDN services. Its new businesses include platform, business-to-business (B2B), healthcare.

The company's Internet Protocol (IP)-based central exchange system provides Centrex functions (internal calls, customer service numbers, etc.) and offers additional features, such as multiple bell tones, forwarding desk (receptionist function), conference call, call center and voice message functions. It also provides managed services and Information and Communications Technology (ICT) consulting services. Hanaro Telecom was acquired by SK Telecom in 2008 and became a wholly owned subsidiary in mid 2015.

=== SK Communications ===
Founded in 1999 as Lycos Korea, SK Communications is the technology company responsible for some of the most successful internet tools and products in the Korean market. After the company's 2002 takeover by SK Telecom, online portal Nate was launched and has since grown to be one of the most popular portals in Korea. The largest social media site in Korea, Cyworld has seen a sharp rise in its membership, with members reaching 20 million from 16 million in 2005. SK Communications also provides the top instant messaging service NateOn. As of December 2006, NateOn had 13 million users and led the local market. In 2006, the Nate.com portal was revamped as a Web 2.0 user-centric site with an emphasis on personalized content and social networking. Cyworld II also re-launched with Web 2.0 offerings, including a personalized mini-homepage, personalized search, UCC video and other user-customizable Web-based applications.

SK Communications is currently extending its online businesses into the global market. In 2006, localized versions of Cyworld were launched in China, Germany, Japan, Taiwan, the U.S., and Vietnam. To make full use of its premium base, the tech firm is building a portfolio of content providers, including education company Etoos; consumer shopping services under the Cymarket brand, which leverage Cyworld's network and traffic; gaming subsidiary SK i-media; and Egloos, the leading independent blogging service in Korea. In addition, the company acquired a significant stake (24.4%) in a powerful online search engine, Empas, for KRW 37.2 billion.

=== SK Planet ===
SK Planet is the e-commerce division of SK headquartered in Pangyo. Business areas include digital contents, integrated commerce and marketing communication.

Its October 2011 launch marked the reorganization of T Store. SK Planet launched qiip, an app store in Japan. 11st is one of the biggest online store complexes in South Korea under the management of SK Planet. Other products include Smart Wallet, a mobile wallet service, OK Cashbag, an integrated mileage service, and Gifticon, a mobile voucher service. As part of the integrated commerce strategy these services are being combined under the brand Syrup.

On November 14, 2014, SK Planet formed a joint venture with Celcom Axiata Berhad of Malaysia. The new e-commerce company is known as Celcom Planet Sdn. Bhd., its online outlet is called 11street Malaysia.

=== SK Telink ===
Founded in April 1998 as an international telephony service provider, SK Telink has grown into a major player in the international calling market. International call services are offered under the ‘00700’ brand. Building on the commercial long-distance telephony and value-added services launched in 2005, the carrier began offering Korean text messaging in June 2006 in the U.S. The service allows subscribers send and receive Korean text messages in the U.S., as well as to and from Korea.

=== TU Media ===
Established in December 2003, TU Media Corp. introduced a new digital media service —satellite Digital Multimedia Broadcasting (DMB). Subscribers can now view satellite TV broadcasts on their portable handsets or via vehicle-mounted terminals. As of December 2006, subscribers to TU Media topped one million, up from 372,000 in 2005. Its nationwide DMB is available on 37 channels, consisting of 16 video, 20 audio and one data, and provides programs on education, games, drama, music, news and culture. In 2006, TU Media launched TUBOX, a pay-per-view movie channel that allows subscribers to see movies prior to DVD release. In addition to South Korea's 84 cities, TU Media provides service in express highways and Seoul metropolitan subways. DMB coverage was later expanded to include the Korea Train eXpress (KTX) Seoul to Busan line, Busan subways and 10 metropolitan Seoul local highways.

In 2010 TU Media was merged with another subsidiary, SK Telink, Korea's leading international call service provider. DMB broadcasts ended two years later as it became uncompetitive in the mobile TV market.

=== SK Square ===
Established in November 2021 through a spin-off, SK Square aim to work in the semiconductor industry as well as invest in media, security services and online shopping companies. As part of the re-organization, Dreamus and various other companies became subsidiaries. SK Square is owned by SK Inc, at 30.01 percent, who are the largest shareholder. Dreamus Company, formerly known as iriver Inc. became a subsidiary with SQ Square being the largest shareholder at 51.4 percent.

== SK Sports ==
SK is a major sponsor in domestic professional sports. It also owns the esports team T1, as part of a cooperation with Comcast Spectacor.

- Baseball: SK Telecom previously owned SK Wyverns before it was sold to Shinsegae, becoming SSG Landers.
- Basketball: Seoul SK Knights (Korean Basketball League)
- Fencing: SK has sponsored the Seoul Grand Prix of the Fencing World Cup circuit and the Korean Fencing Federation's national fencers since 2003.
- Football: Jeju SK FC (K League 1)
- Golf: SK sponsors the SK Telecom Open golf tournament and several golfers.
- Handball: SK is the main sponsor of the Handball Korea League and established the women's team SK Sugar Gliders and men's team SK Hawks.
- Speed skating: SK sponsors the national short track speed skating team.

One of SK Telecom's major corporate rivals is KT Corporation. Match-ups between teams owned by both companies are dubbed the "Telecommunications Derby" by the media. The rivalry is contested in esports and men's basketball. When SK owned a baseball team, the term was also applied to match-ups between SK Wyverns and KT Wiz. Due to KT Wiz being a relatively new franchise and having a poor record for much of its early years, the "rivalry" was largely one-sided and given less attention compared to esports and basketball, where such match-ups are generally hotly contested affairs.

== See also ==
- Cyworld
- KT Corporation
- LG Uplus
- Rebellions (merged with SK's subsidiary Sapeon Korea)
- SK Group
- SK Telecom T1
- SK Teletech (now merged with Pantech & Sky Electronics)
- TU Media
