= Multimedia Broadcast Multicast Service =

Point-to-multipoint interface for 3GPP cellular networks

Multimedia Broadcast Multicast Services (MBMS) is a point-to-multipoint interface specification for existing 3GPP cellular networks, which is designed to provide efficient delivery of broadcast and multicast services, both within a cell as well as within the core network. For broadcast transmission across multiple cells, it defines transmission via single-frequency network configurations. The specification is referred to as Evolved Multimedia Broadcast Multicast Services (eMBMS) when transmissions are delivered through an LTE (Long Term Evolution) network. eMBMS is also known as LTE Broadcast.

Target applications include mobile TV and radio broadcasting, live streaming video services, as well as file delivery and emergency alerts.

Questions remain whether the technology is an optimization tool for the operator or if an operator can generate new revenues with it. Several studies have been published on the domain identifying both cost savings and new revenues.

== Deployments ==
In 2013, Verizon announced that it would launch eMBMS services in 2014, over its nationwide (United States) LTE networks. AT&T subsequently announced plans to use the 700 MHz Lower D and E Block licenses it acquired in 2011 from Qualcomm for an LTE Broadcast service.

Several major operators worldwide have been lining-up to deploy and test the technology. The frontrunners being Verizon in the United States, Kt and Reliance in Asia, and recently EE and Vodafone in Europe.

In January 2014, Korea's Kt launched the first commercial LTE Broadcast service. The solution includes Kt's internally developed eMBMS Bearer Service, and Samsung mobile devices fitted with the ENENSYS Expway Middleware as the eMBMS User Service.

In February 2014, Verizon demonstrated the potential of LTE Broadcast during Super Bowl XLVIII, using Samsung Galaxy Note 3s, fitted with ENENSYS Expway's eMBMS User Service.

In July 2014, Nokia demonstrated the use of LTE Broadcast to replace Traditional Digital TV. This use case remains controversial as some study are doubting about the capability of LTE Broadcast to address this use case efficiently in its current version.

Also in July 2014, BBC Research & Development and EE demonstrated LTE Broadcast during the XX Commonwealth Games in Glasgow, Scotland using equipment from Huawei and Qualcomm.

In August 2014, Ericsson and Polkomtel successfully tested LTE Broadcast technology by streaming the opening game of the 2014 World Volleyball Championship to hundreds of guests at Warsaw's National Stadium in Poland on August 30.

In June 2015, BBC Research & Development and EE demonstrated LTE Broadcast during the FA Cup final in the U.K.

In September 2015, Verizon demonstrated eMBMS by broadcasting INDYCAR races.

In October 2015, Verizon commercially launched their Go90 eMBMS service. Go90 offers both On-Demand and LiveTV, in both Unicast and Broadcast, and supports more than 10 different LTE Broadcast mobile devices. Verizon ceased operating the go90 service on July 31, 2018.

In February 2016, Akamai demonstrated with ENENSYS Expway, delivery of video streams across LTE networks with live on the fly switching from unicast to broadcast, at Mobile World Congress 2016.

In April 2016, Verizon, Telstra, KT and EE launched the LTE Broadcast Alliance.

As of January 2019, the Global Mobile Suppliers Association had identified 41 operators that have invested in eMBMS (including those considering/testing/trialling, deploying or piloting and those that have deployed or launched eMBMS). Five operators state they have now deployed eMBMS or launched some sort of commercial service using eMBMS.

The range of chipsets available that can support eMBMS has been steadily growing, with three mobile processors/platforms released since March 2018. GSA has identified 69 chipsets supporting eMBMS, and there are at least 59 devices that support eMBMS (in some instances after operator-specific upgrades).

== Competing technologies ==
Main competing technologies of MBMS include DVB-H/DVB-T, DVB-SH, DMB, ESM-DAB, and MediaFLO. However, due to spectrum scarcity and the cost of building new broadcast infrastructure some of these technologies may not be viable. MediaFLO has been deployed commercially in the US by Verizon Wireless through their relationship with MediaFLO USA, Inc. (a subsidiary of Qualcomm) however the service was shut down in early 2011. DMB and DVB-H trials have been ongoing for more than a year now, like those during the football 2006 championships in Germany.

Huawei's proprietary CMB is a precursor to the Multimedia Broadcast Multicast Service. It was specified in 3GPP R6 and is using existing UMTS infrastructure. Huawei says that CMB is based on existing UMTS infrastructure and real time streaming application protocol.

The most significant competition is from services that stream individual video feeds to users over unicast data connections. While less efficient in certain situations, particularly the traditional case where everyone watches the same stream simultaneously, the user convenience of individual streaming has taken over the vast majority of the mobile media streaming market.

== Technical description ==
The MBMS feature is split into the MBMS Bearer Service and the MBMS User Service and has been defined to be offered over both UTRAN (i.e. WCDMA, TD-CDMA and TD-SCDMA) and LTE (where it is often referred to as eMBMS). The MBMS Bearer Service includes a Unicast and a Broadcast Mode. MBMS Operation On-Demand (MOOD) allows dynamic switching between Unicast and Broadcast over LTE, based on configured triggers. The MBMS Bearer Service uses IP multicast addresses for the IP flows. The advantage of the MBMS Bearer Service compared to unicast bearer services (interactive, streaming, etc.) is that the transmission resources in the core and radio networks are shared. One MBMS packet flow is replicated by GGSN, SGSN and RNCs. MBMS may use an advanced counting scheme to decide, whether or not zero, one or more dedicated (i.e. unicast) radio channels lead to a more efficient system usage than one common (i.e. broadcast) radio channel.

- UTRAN MBMS offers up to 256 kbit/s per MBMS Bearer Service and between 800 kbit/s and 1.7 Mbit/s per cell/band. The actual cell capacity depends on the UE capabilities.
- GERAN MBMS offers between 32 kbit/s and 128 kbit/s. Up to 4 GSM timeslots may be used for one MBMS bearer in the downlink direction. The actual data rate per Traffic Slot depends on network dimensioning.

The MBMS User Service is basically the MBMS Service Layer and offers two different data Delivery Methods:

- The Streaming Delivery Method can be used for continuous transmissions like mobile television services. An application layer FEC code may be used to increase the transmission reliability.
- The Download Delivery Method is intended for “download and play” services. A File Repair service may be offered to compensate for unreliable delivery.

MBMS has been standardized in various groups of 3GPP (Third Generation Partnership Project), and the first phase standards are found in UMTS release 6. As Release 6 was functionally frozen by the 3rd quarter of 2004, practical network implementations may be expected by the end of 2007, and the first functional mobile terminals supporting MBMS are estimated to be available by also end of 2007.

eMBMS has been standardized in various groups of 3GPP as part of LTE release 9. The LTE version of MBMS, referred to as Multicast-broadcast single-frequency network (MBSFN), supports broadcast only services and is based on a Single Frequency Network (SFN) based OFDM waveform and so is functional similar to other broadcast solutions such as DVB-H, -SH and -NGH. In Release 14, the 3GPP enhanced the specifications for eMBMS with a view to making the technology more attractive for deployment by operators and broadcasters. The 3GPP's work on the next generation of technology in Release 16 includes a study on LTE-based broadcast on 5G networks, MBMS APIs for mission-critical services and MBMS user services for IoT.

== 3GPP technical specifications ==
MBMS Bearer Service (Distribution Layer):

- 3GPP TS 22.146 Multimedia Broadcast/Multicast Service (MBMS); Stage 1
- 3GPP TS 23.246 Multimedia Broadcast/Multicast Service (MBMS); Architecture and functional description
- 3GPP TS 25.346 Introduction of the Multimedia Broadcast/Multicast Service (MBMS) in the Radio Access Network (RAN); Stage 2
- 3GPP TS 25.992 Multimedia Broadcast Multicast Service (MBMS); UTRAN/GERAN Requirements
- 3GPP TS 36.300 Evolved Universal Terrestrial Radio Access (E-UTRA) and Evolved Universal Terrestrial Radio Access Network (E-UTRAN); Overall description; Stage 2 (see chapter 15 for eMBMS)
- 3GPP TS 36.440 General aspects and principles for interfaces supporting Multimedia Broadcast Multicast Service (MBMS) within E-UTRAN
- 3GPP TS 43.246 Multimedia Broadcast/Multicast Service (MBMS) in the GERAN; Stage 2
- 3GPP TR 25.803 S-CCPCH performance for Multimedia Broadcast/Multicast Service (MBMS)

MBMS User Service (Service Layer):

- 3GPP TS 22.246 Multimedia Broadcast/Multicast Service (MBMS) user services; Stage 1
- 3GPP TS 26.346 Multimedia Broadcast/Multicast Service (MBMS); Protocols and codecs
- 3GPP TR 26.946 Multimedia Broadcast/Multicast Service (MBMS) user service guidelines
- 3GPP TS 33.246 3G Security; Security of Multimedia Broadcast/Multicast Service (MBMS)
- 3GPP TS 32.273 Telecommunication management; Charging management; Multimedia Broadcast and Multicast Service (MBMS) charging

== See also ==
- LTE
- Mobile television
- TDtv
- Broadcast and Multicast Service (BCMCS), a point-to-multipoint service defined for 3GPP2 systems
