= Mobile television =

Television for handheld or mobile device

Mobile television is television (TV) watched on a small handheld or mobile device, typically developed for that purpose. It includes services delivered via mobile phone networks, received free-to-air via terrestrial television stations, or via satellite broadcast. Regular broadcast standards or special mobile TV transmission formats can be used. Additional features may include downloading TV programs and podcasts from the Internet and storing programming for later viewing. Except in South Korea, consumer acceptance of broadcast mobile TV was limited due to a lack of compatible devices.

Early mobile TV receivers were based on analog television systems. These models were the earliest televisions that could be placed in a coat pocket. The first was the Panasonic IC TV MODEL TR-001, introduced in 1970. The second was the Microvision or the MTV-1, and was also the first television that could pick up signals in multiple countries. The project took over ten years to develop and was funded by around £1.6 million in British government grants. Later products used 2G and 3G cellular technology as well as digital TV spectrum.

In the 2010s, specialized mobile TV platforms and protocols were discontinued worldwide due to the rapid deployment of LTE cellular networks and the growing popularity of streaming television over the internet on modern smartphones.

== Implementation ==
=== East Asia ===
In 2002, South Korea was the first country to introduce commercial mobile TV via 2G CDMA IS95-C, and 3G (CDMA2000 1X EVDO) networks. In 2005, South Korea became the first country to broadcast satellite mobile TV via Satellite-DMB and Terrestrial-DMB. Mobile TV services were launched in Hong Kong in 2006 by the operator CSL on the 3G network.

=== North America ===
In the US, Verizon Wireless and AT&T offered MediaFLO, a subscription service from March 2007 until March 2011. AT&T introduced AT&T Mobile TV in 2008.

In 2007, the Advanced Television Systems Committee and the Consumer Electronics Association created an MDTV and began identifying compatible products as "MDTV".

White House officials and members of Congress saw a demonstration on July 28, 2009 from Ion Media in conjunction with the Open Mobile Video Coalition. Another demonstration took place October 16, 2009 with journalists, industry executives and broadcasters riding around Washington, D.C., in a bus with prototype devices. Included were those who would be testing the devices in the Washington and Baltimore markets in January 2010.

In 2009, the Open Mobile Video Coalition began testing with four stations: WATL, WPXA-TV, KOMO-TV, and KONG-TV.

In 2009, FCC chair Julius Genachowski announced an effort to increase the spectrum available to wireless services. Also in August, WTVE and Axcera began testing a single-frequency network (SFN) with multiple transmitters using the new mobile standard.

In December 2009, Concept Enterprises introduced the first mobile DTV tuner for automobiles.

On September 23, 2010, Media General began its first MDTV service at WCMH-TV in Columbus, Ohio and had plans to do the same a month later at WFLA-TV in the Tampa Bay, Florida area in addition to five to seven more stations in its portfolio.

On November 19, 2010, a joint venture of 12 major broadcasters known as the Mobile Content Venture (MCV) announced plans to upgrade TV stations in 20 markets representing 40 percent of the United States population to deliver live video to portable devices by the end of 2011.

As of January 2012, there were 120 stations in the United States broadcasting using the ATSC-M/H "Mobile DTV" standard.

By early 2013, 130 stations were providing content, but the adoption of devices such as dongles was not widespread.

In January 2012, the MCV announced that MetroPCS would offer MCV's Dyle mobile DTV service. Samsung planned an Android phone capable of receiving this service late in 2012. At the end of 2012, Dyle was in 35 markets and capable of reaching 55 percent of viewers. According to the home page on its website, "As of May 22, 2015, Dyle mobile TV is no longer in service, and Dyle-enabled devices and their apps will no longer be supported."

As of 2023, WNUV CW 54, a NextGen TV station in Baltimore, is broadcasting in a format called MobileW at 480p resolution for cell phone reception.

=== Europe ===
BT launched mobile TV in the United Kingdom in September 2006, but the services were abandoned in less than a year. Germany had a failed endeavor with MFD Mobiles Fernsehen Deutschland, which launched their DMB-based service in June 2006 in Germany, but ended it in April 2008. Also in June 2006, mobile operator 3 in Italy (part of Hutchison Whampoa) launched their mobile TV service, but in contrast to Germany's MFD it was based on the European DVB-H standard.

== Standards ==
=== Mobile network ===
- eMBMS (Evolved Mobile Broadcast Multicast Service) – also known as LTE Broadcast, transmissions are delivered through an LTE cellular network
- 5G Broadcast – transmissions delivered through cellular networks to 5G-capable hardware

=== Terrestrial ===
- 1seg (One Segment) – Mobile TV system on ISDB-T
- ATSC-M/H (ATSC Mobile/Handheld) – North America
- DAB-IP (Digital Audio Broadcast) – UK
- T-DMB (Terrestrial Digital Multimedia Broadcast) – South Korea
- DMB-T/H – China
- DVB-H (Digital Video Broadcasting – Handheld) – European Union, Asia
  - DVB-T (Digital Video Broadcasting – Terrestrial)
  - DVB-T2
  - DVB-T2 Lite – Europe, Africa, Asia and some countries in South America
  - DVB-NGH
- iMB (Integrated Mobile Broadcast, 3GPP MBMS)
- ISDB-Tmm (Integrated Services Digital Broadcasting – Terrestrial Mobile Multimedia) – Japan
- MediaFLO – launched in US, tested in UK and Germany

=== Satellite ===
- CMMB (China Mobile Multimedia Broadcasting) – China
- DVB-SH (Digital Video Broadcasting – Satellite for Handhelds) – European Union
- S-DMB (Satellite Digital Multimedia Broadcast) – South Korea

== See also ==
- Handheld projector
- Multimedia Broadcast Multicast Service (MBMS) via the GSM and UMTS cellular networks
- IPTV
- SPB TV
- Mobile DTV Alliance – marketing organization
- 3 mobile tv (UK)
- Mobiclip
- MobiTV
- Nunet
- Mobibase
- Handheld television
