= SPB TV =

- Type: Private company
- Industry: Telecommunications
- Predecessor: SPB Software
- Founded: 2007; 19 years ago
- Headquarters: Zug, Switzerland
- Key people: Kirill Filippov (CEO)
- Products: OTT TV, IP TV and mobile TV solutions
- Number of employees: 50-200

SPB TV is a company developing technological solutions for OTT, TV, IP TV, and mobile TV.

One of the major venture of SPB TV is an OTT TV platform for broadcasting TV and video content worldwide, pretended technologies for in-stream adds replacement, and a set-top box for personalised viewing on a home screen. The company was founded in 2007. Its R&D headquarters is in St. Petersburg and it is a Skolkovo resident. SPB TV solutions are integrated by mobile operators and media companies.

== SPB TV history and services ==
In 2006, a group of Russian IT specialists developed a mobile TV media platform. The result of their activities made it possible to launch the SPB TV mobile television service in 2007. Since then, SPB TV has existed as an independent company that is engaged in the creation and development of its own technologies in the field of online broadcasting. The CEO of the company is Kirill Filippov. From the start, SPB TV video service was available worldwide. In 2016 a separate service SPB TV Russia was initiated. It is available only in the territory of the Russian Federation. With its appearance, the international version of SPB TV became known as SPB TV World. The head office is located in Zug (Switzerland) and the research and development center is based in St. Petersburg (Russia). The SPB TV group of companies includes Skolkovo resident Pitersoftwarehaus.

Since 2013 the company has been a member of the Association of Communication Agencies of Russia (ACAR) and IAB Russia. In 2014, the company joined RUSSOFT and RAEC.

== Projects ==
- 2007 – the emergence of the SPB TV service for delivering video and audio content to mobile devices. Launch of the Skylink operator's multimedia service.
- 2009 – SPB TV versions released for Windows Mobile, Symbian, Android and Blackberry platforms.
- 2010 – launch of a TV service for the Singaporean operator StarHub and a mobile video portal for Megafon telecom operator.
- 2011 – launch of the first operator's mobile service MTS TV, launch of the broadcast of the Copa America football championship for mTraffic. company.
- 2012 – in partnership with DigiVive, the NexgTV mobile TV service was released. It was also adapted by several operators under their own brand White Label, BSNL, MTNL Mumbai и MTNL Delhi.
- 2012 – launch of a mobile video portal for Beeline company in Russia, the relay of radio stations for the Beeline service was launched.
- 2013 – launch of the AMEDIATEKA online cinema. The cinema belongs to the Amedia company. The content includes TV series HBO, Starz, ABC, BBC and other world-famous producers. Premieres, as a rule, take place in the service simultaneously with the rest of the world.
- 2014 – launch of OTT service in Belarus for A1 operator (velcom).
- 2015 – launch of an international service for the virtual mobile operator Lebara.
- 2015 – launch of a mobile TV service for the Mobilink operator.
- 2016 – a new version of the SPB TV Rosing platform, named after the scientist Boris Rosing.
- 2017 – release of the first Russian TV set-top box based on Android TV, certified by Google in Russia.
- 2017 – advertisement replacement for the First Channel's online air.
- 2018 – launch of the interactive television service Danzer TV.
- 2019 – launch of the first multi-screen OTT TV in Uzbekistan for the Beeline brand.
- 2020 – launch of E Terra Journal, a service for esports and gaming industry fans.
- 2020 – launch of an online market of Russian content for the Roskino company.
- 2021 – launch of A1 video service for passengers of transport networks.
- 2021 – SPB TV Media signed an agreement with NTRK on broadcasting of 12 Uzbek channels in the Russian Federation and the CIS.

== Collaboration with Chinese media ==
Since 2013, SPB TV has been broadcasting Chinese content. Channels of Xinhua News Agency, CNC World Chinese and CNC English TV, were launched first. In 2015, Dragon TV International was added to the app. At the same time, a contract was signed between SPB TV and the CNTV Internet television (a subsidiary of the CCTV teleholding) for broadcasting of CCTV-4 (Chinese International), CCTV-9 Documentary, CCTV News, CCTV Français, CCTV Español, CCTV Russian and CCTV Arabian.

Localized versions of the children's animated series Luntik, Nick the Inventor and Magic Kitchen were licensed for broadcast in China with participation of SPB TV.

On December 16, 2020, in Beijing, SPB TV was awarded the Golden Ribbon Special Contribution Award at the Belt and Road Media Community Forum. Belt and Road Media Community recognized the most active organizations that have provided assistance and support to partners in the fight against the COVID-19 epidemic with this award.
