= TU Media =

TU Media Corp.(SK telink)
- Company type: Subsidiary
- Industry: Digital Multimedia Broadcasting
- Founded: December 2003
- Defunct: November 2010
- Fate: Merged with SK Telink
- Headquarters: Jung-gu, Seoul, South Korea
- Key people: Suh Young-Kil (CEO)
- Parent: SK Telecom
- Website: http://www.sktelink.com/jsp/main/main.jsp

TU Media Corp. was South Korea's first mobile broadcast service company headquartered in Seoul, South Korea. Its name stood for "TV for you." It was established in 2003 as a subsidiary of SK Telecom. SK Telecom owned 44% of the company's shares. Currently about 1.3 million people were subscribers to the service before its shutdown.

== Service ==
TU Media Corp. provides services on the Satellite Digital Multimedia Broadcasting (S-DMB) network with full coverage for the Korean peninsula.

In April 2006, in preparation for the 2006 FIFA World Cup service was made available along the entire KTX rail system; providing a high quality reception at a travelling speed of 300 km/h.

On May 25, 2006, TU Media opened its service in the Busan Subway system.

TU Milestones

- 2001 Sep. Applied for the registration to the ITU Satellite Network (by SK Telecom)
- 2002 Nov. Established Wireless Test Center(Seoul)
- 2003 Sep. Signed a contract with Japan’s MBCo for joint possession of DMB satellite
- 2003 Dec. Established TU Media Corp.
- 2004 Feb. Completed Broadcasting Center
- 2004 Mar. Successfully launched DMB satellite called ‘Hanbyul’
- 2004 Dec. Acquired satellite DMB business license
- 2005 Jan. Began pilot satellite DMB service
- 2005 May Launched commercial satellite DMB service with 7 video and 20 audio channels
- 2006 May Offered 12 video and 26 audio channels
- 2006 Dec. Reached 1,020,000 subscribers
- 2007 Apr. Launched a data channel for traffic information
- 2007 Sep. Offered 18 video and 20 audio channels
- 2008 Feb. Reached 1,300,000 subscribers
- 2008 Jun. Offered 21 video and 19 audio channels
- 2008 Jul. Reached 1,400,000 subscribers
- 2010 Nov. Merger with SK Telink
- 2012 Jul. TU Media closure
- 2012 Aug. S-DMB service ends.

== See also ==
- Economy of South Korea
- Digital Multimedia Broadcasting
- Communications in South Korea
