= Digital multimedia broadcasting =

South Korean digital TV standard

- Hangul: 디지털 멀티미디어 방송
- Hanja: 디지털 멀티미디어 放送
- Revised Romanization: Dijiteol Meoltimidieo Bangsong
- McCune–Reischauer: Tijit'ŏl Mŏltimidiŏ Pangsong

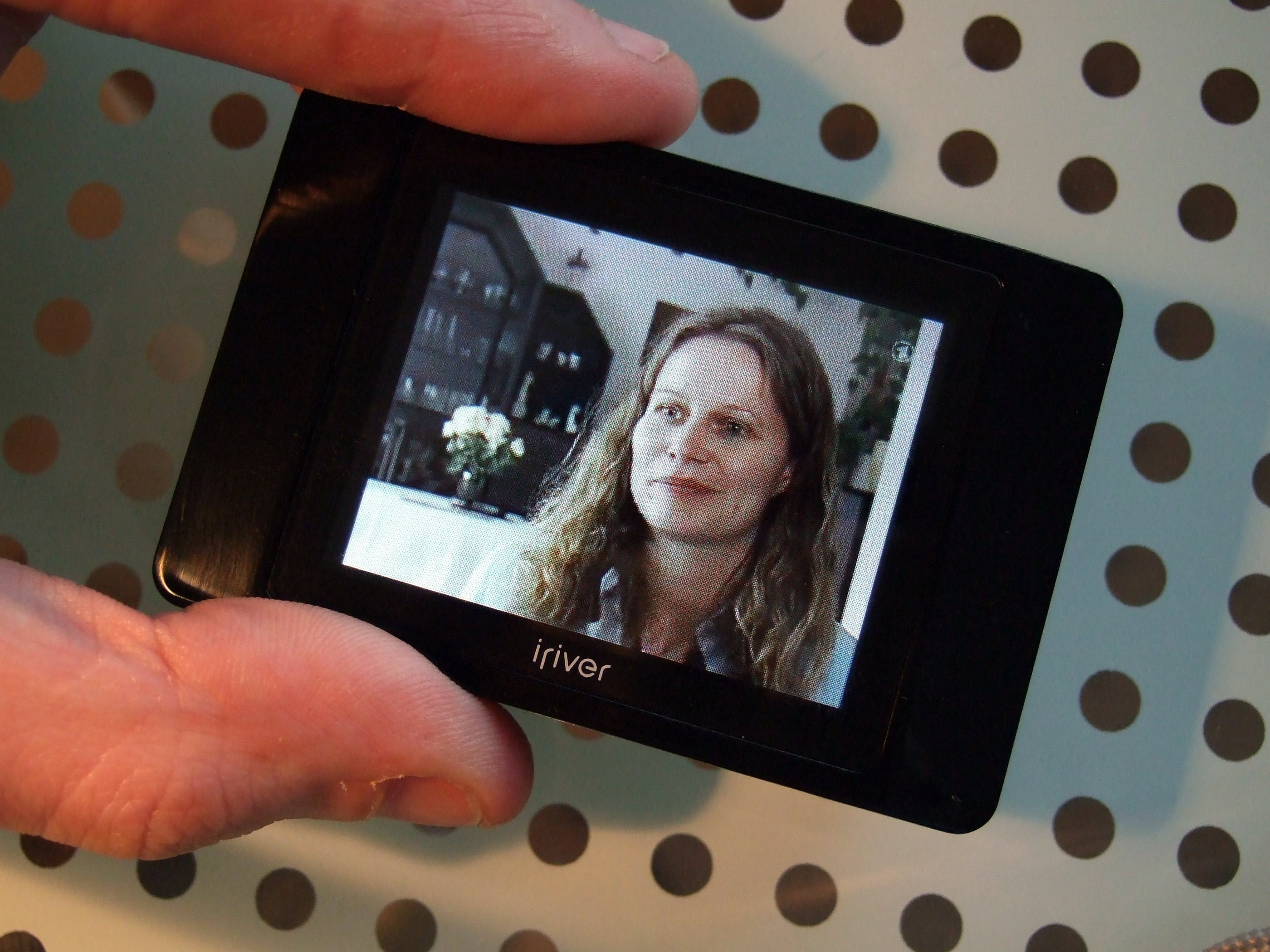
Live DMB broadcast on an iriver device during trials in Munich, Germany (2007)

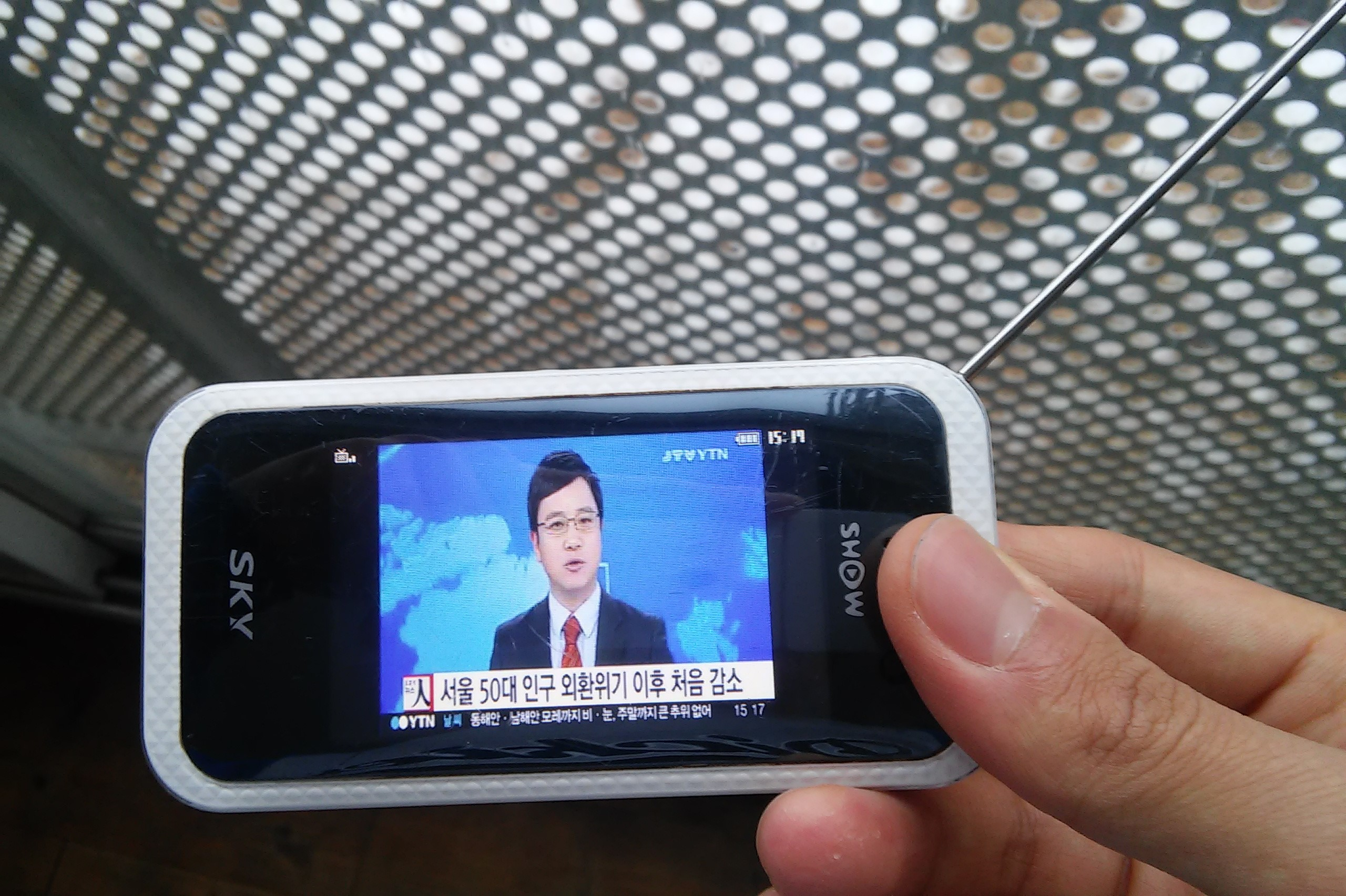
A DMB television broadcast received on a mobile device in South Korea

Digital multimedia broadcasting (DMB) is a digital radio transmission technology developed in South Korea as part of the national IT project for sending multimedia such as TV, radio and datacasting to mobile devices such as mobile phones, laptops and GPS navigation systems. This technology, sometimes known as mobile TV, should not be confused with Digital Audio Broadcasting (DAB) which was developed as a research project for the European Union.

DMB was developed in South Korea as the next generation digital technology to replace FM radio, but the technological foundations were laid by Prof. Dr. Gert Siegle and Dr. Hamed Amor at Bosch in Germany. The world's first official mobile TV service started in South Korea in May 2005, although trials were available much earlier. It can operate via satellite (S-DMB) or terrestrial (T-DMB) transmission. DMB has also some similarities with its former competing mobile TV standard, DVB-H.

== T-DMB ==
T-DMB is made for terrestrial transmissions on band III (VHF) and L (UHF) frequencies. DMB is unavailable in the United States because those frequencies are allocated for television broadcasting (VHF channels 7 to 13) and military applications. USA is adopting ATSC-M/H for free broadcasts to mobiles, and for a time, Qualcomm's proprietary MediaFLO system. In Japan, 1seg is the standard, using ISDB.

T-DMB uses MPEG-4 Part 10 (H.264) for the video and MPEG-4 Part 3 BSAC or HE-AAC v2 for the audio. The audio and video is encapsulated in an MPEG transport stream (MPEG-TS). The stream is forward error corrected by Reed Solomon encoding and the parity word is 16 bytes long. There is convolutional interleaving made on this stream, then the stream is broadcast in data stream mode on DAB. In order to diminish the channel effects such as fading and shadowing, the DMB modem uses OFDM-DQPSK modulation. A single-chip T-DMB receiver is also provided by an MPEG transport stream demultiplexer. DMB has several applicable devices such as mobile phone, portable TV, PDA and telematics devices for automobiles.

T-DMB is an [ETSI] standard (TS 102 427 and TS 102 428). As of December 14, 2007, ITU formally approved T-DMB as the global standard, along with three other standards, like DVB-H, 1seg, and MediaFLO.

== Smart DMB ==
Smart DMB started in January 2013 in South Korea. Smart DMB has a VOD service and quality has been improved from 240p to 480p. Smart DMB is built in many Korean smartphones starting with the Galaxy Grand in January 2013.

== HD DMB ==
HD DMB started in August 2016 in South Korea. HD DMB has been improved from 240p to 720p. It uses HEVC.5 codec. There are currently 6 HD DMB stations in Seoul. Smartphones integrated Qualcomm Snapdragon 801 or higher received firmware upgrade to support HD DMB.

== Countries using DMB ==
Currently, DMB is being put into use in a number of countries, although mainly used in South Korea. Also see list of Countries using DAB/DMB.

=== South Korea ===
In 2005, South Korea became the world's first country to start S-DMB and T-DMB service on May 1 and December 1, respectively. In December 2006, T-DMB service in South Korea consists of, 7 TV channels, 12 radio channels, and 8 data channels. These are broadcast on six multiplexes in the VHF band on TV channels 8 and 12 (6 MHz raster). In October 2007, South Korea added broadcasting channel MBCNET to the DMB channel. But in 2010, this channel changed tnN go. In 2009 there were eight DMB video channels in Seoul, and six in other metropolitan cities. As of April 2013, S-DMB service in South Korea consists of 15 TV channels, 2 radio channels and 6 data channels.

South Korea has had Full T-DMB services including JSS (Jpeg Slide Show), DLS (Dynamic Label Segment), BWS, and TPEG since 2006.

S-DMB service in South Korea is provided on a subscription basis through TU Media and is accessible throughout the country. T-DMB service is provided free of charge, but access is limited to selected regions.

Around one million receivers have been sold as of June 2006. 14 million DMB receivers were sold including T-DMB and S-DMB in South Korea, and 40% of the new cell phones have the capability to see DMB.

Receivers are integrated in car navigation systems, mobile phones, portable media players, laptop computers and digital cameras. In mid-August 2007, Iriver, a multimedia and micro-technology company released their "NV", which utilizes South Korea's DMB service.

Since the advent of smartphones DMBs have been made available on phones with receivers through smartphone applications, most of which come pre-installed in phones made and sold in South Korea.

=== Other countries ===
Some T-DMB trials are currently available or planned around Europe and other countries:

- In Norway T-DMB services was made available between May 2009 and January 2018. MiniTV DMB service launched by the Norwegian Mobile TV Corporation (NMTV) and was backed by the three largest broadcasters in Norway: the public broadcaster NRK, TV2 and Modern Times Group (MTG). The live channels were available in and around Greater Oslo.
- Germany's Mobiles Fernsehen Deutschland (MFD) launched the commercial T-DMB service "Watcha" in June 2006, in time for the World Cup 2006, marketed together with Samsung's P900 DMB Phone, the first DMB Phone in Europe. It was stopped in April 2008 as MFD is now favouring DVB-H, the European standard.
- France in December 2007 chose T-DMB Audio in VHF band III and L band as the national standard for terrestrial digital radio. It was replaced later by DAB+.
- China in 2006 chose DAB as an industrial standard. Since 2007, DAB and T-DMB services broadcast in Beijing, Guangdong, Henan, Dalian, Yunnan, Liaoning, Hunan, Zhejiang, Anhui, and Shenzhen.
- In Mexico most cell phone carriers offer DMB broadcasting as part of their basic plans. As of 2008 the vast majority of Mexico receives DMB signals.
- Ghana is running a T-DMB service in Accra and Kumasi on mobile network since May 2008.
- Netherlands: MFD, T-Systems and private investors are planning a DMB service under the name Mobiel TV Nederland. Callmax will also deploy a DMB service on the L-Band frequency in the Netherlands.
- Indonesia is currently running a trial in Jakarta.
- Italy and Vatican City: RAI and Vatican Radio are currently running a trial some areas.
- Canada has been running trials since 2006 in Ottawa, Toronto, Vancouver and Montreal, done by CBC/Radio-Canada.
- Malaysia has been running trials since 2008 in KL, done by TV3/MPB. Initially, the government was committed to deploying DVB-T for government-owned channels, however as of December 2009, RTM1 and 2, as well as all the radio channels, are available over Band III for DMB-T as in addition to DVB-T. Additionally, the TV3 DMB signal has moved to L Band. The TV3 DMB signals are still limited to the Damansara and Kuala Lumpur area, while the government owned DMB-T signals have a wider coverage and apparently covers most of the Klang Valley area. The government transmissions are part of a two-year trial that is part of a test that also involves the DAB and DAB+ digital radio standard.
- Cambodia in August 2010 chose T-DMB as the national standard for terrestrial digital broadcasting. TVK is currently running a trial.

== DMB in automobiles ==
T-DMB works flawlessly in vehicles traveling up to 300 km/h. In tunnels or underground areas, both television and radio broadcast is still available, though DMB may skip occasionally. In South Korea, some long-distance buses adopted T-DMB instead of satellite TV such as Sky TV. It works quite well even though the resolution is 240p, lower than satellite. In comparison, satellite is usually 480p or higher.

== See also ==
- 1seg
- China Multimedia Mobile Broadcasting (CMMB)
- Digital Audio Broadcasting (DAB)
- Digital Radio Mondiale (DRM)
- Digital Video Broadcasting (DVB)
- ETSI Satellite Digital Radio (SDR)
- FMeXtra
- Handheld projector
- Internet radio device
- International Journal of Digital Multimedia Broadcasting
- Multimedia Broadcast Multicast Service
- Satellite radio
- Satellite television
- WiBro
- WiMAX
- WorldDMB
- DVB-H
