= North Metro TV =

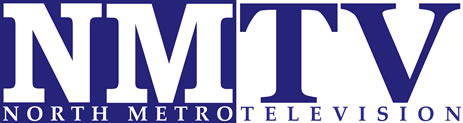
The current logo for North Metro TV

North Metro TV, also known as "NMTV", is a community and Public, educational, and government access (PEG) television station servicing the cities of Blaine, Centerville, Circle Pines, Ham Lake, Lexington, Lino Lakes, and Spring Lake Park in the Twin Cities Northern Metro area in Minnesota.

NMTV Cablecasts on Comcast cable stations 14 (Public-access television) and 15 (community news, sports, and more). It also broadcast Government-access television (GATV) channels for the local city governments and Educational-access television for the school boards.

NMTV also provides drone services for aerial videos and photos along with commercial productions for local entities.

NMTV's two channels are available worldwide online at Most of NMTV's programming is also available on-demand 24 hours a day via its website.

== Sports ==
North Metro TV broadcasts several types of events including sports with their live production truck. Most of the productions done with their production truck are high school sports. The 3 high schools that NMTV covers are Blaine High School, the Centennial High School and Spring Lake Park High School.

Sports Den is a live, weekly highlight show that features the sports teams of Blaine, Centennial and Spring Lake Park. The show highlights numerous sports including football, soccer, volleyball, tennis, swimming & diving, hockey, basketball, wrestling, adapted floor hockey and more. Interviews with athletes and coaches, analysis, stats, standings and schedules are also a part of the show. They also broadcast a live season finale with athlete guests, a hit feature that highlights the plays of the years and awards to the athletes of the season.

Sports Den is in its 10th Season, formerly known as Locker Room Live, which ran for 12 seasons prior. Sports Den is hosted by Kenton Kipp and Jeff Dinsmore, who have been the hosts for over 14 years. Sports Den airs daily at 2:00, 6:00 & 10:00 AM or PM, from August through March.

== USA Cup Soccer Coverage ==
North Metro TV Broadcasts the USA Cup every summer at the National Sports Center with the production truck, including the Opening Ceremonies. It's one of the biggest and most well known events in the 7 city area and it can also be viewed online.

== Public Access ==
North Metro TV hosts an exciting public-access television community. Any citizen of the seven cities NMTV services is welcome to use North Metro TV's professional grade HD or SD cameras, studios, and editing equipment free of charge. Free classes in the use of these facilities and equipment are also available.

Some of the programs broadcast on North Metro Channel 14 include "The NMTV Basement", "How Old?!?: Celebrity Edition", "In Focus", "Wednesdays with Barbie", and a Christmas and Halloween special. These are all produced by Eric Houston along with Volunteers.

Series of programs produced entirely by volunteer producers include Lovepower, Local Edition, MN Hot Rod TV, Positive Investigations, A Fresh New Day, Exploring Aviation, Imprisoned, and much more.

== News ==
The NMTV News logo

NMTV is home to North Metro TV News, a news show that began in 1998 . Anchored by news director Danika Peterson and producer Rusty Ray, North Metro TV News provides weekly coverage of news and events from across the northern metro area.

North Metro TV News airs daily at 10:30, 2:30, and 6:30 AM and PM on North Metro Channel 15.
