= Norwegian Mobile TV =

Norwegian Mobile TV Corporation (Norwegian: Norges mobil-tv, NMTV) is a limited company that delivers mobile TV via DMB. It is fully owned by the three largest Norwegian broadcasters (NRK, TV 2 and MTG). NMTV works closely with other companies from other industries. NMTV was one of the founders of International DMB Advancement Group (IDAG).

The company was established on August 13, 2008. NMTV launched broadcast mobile TV via DMB on May 15, 2009, under the name MiniTV. The service was opened by then Norwegian Minister of Culture, Trond Giske.

NMTVs CEO is Gunnar Garfors.
