= Basic exchange telecommunications radio service =

Radio service

In telecommunications, a basic exchange telecommunications radio service (BETRS) is a commercial service that can extend telephone service to rural areas by replacing the local loop with radio communications. In the BETRS, non-government ultra high frequency (UHF) and very high frequency (VHF) common carrier and the private radio service frequencies are shared. BETRS technology was developed in the mid-1980s and allows up to four subscribers to use a single radio channel pair, simultaneously, without interfering with one another.

In the US, this service may operate in the paired 152/158 and 454/459 MHz bands and on 10 channel blocks in the 816-820/861-865 MHz bands. BETRS may be licensed only to state-certified carriers in the area where the service is provided and is considered a part of the public switched telephone network (PSTN) by state regulators.

Regulation of this service currently resides in parts 1 and 22 of the Code of Federal Regulations (CFR), Subtitle 47 on Telecommunications, and may be researched or ordered through the Government Printing Office (GPO).

== See also ==
- Federal Communications Commission (Wireless Bureau)
