= International Journal of Digital Multimedia Broadcasting =

- Discipline: Digital broadcasting technology
- Language: English

Publication details
- History: 2007-present
- Publisher: Hindawi Publishing Corporation
- Open access: Yes

Standard abbreviations
- ISO 4: Int. J. Digit. Multimed. Broadcast.

Indexing
- ISSN: 1687-7578 (print); 1687-7586 (web)
- LCCN: 2008204569
- OCLC no.: 502432280

Links
- Journal homepage; Online archive

The International Journal of Digital Multimedia Broadcasting is a peer-reviewed scientific journal covering all aspects of digital broadcasting technology. It was established in 2007 by Fa-Long Luo, who served as founding editor-in-chief until 2011. The journal is published by Hindawi Publishing Corporation.

== Abstracting and indexing ==
The journal is abstracted and indexed in:

- Computer Science Index
- CSA Technology Research Database
- EBSCO databases
- EI/Compendex
- Electronics and Communications Abstracts
- Inspec
- ProQuest databases
- Scopus
