= 5G Broadcast =

Standard for distribution of media content

5G Broadcast (5GB), officially known as LTE-based 5G Terrestrial Broadcast, is a system for the distribution of television and other broadcast media content via terrestrial radio broadcast networks based on downlink-only LTE technology.

5G Broadcast focuses mainly on mobile use cases like smartphones and in-car radio. It does not require the use of a SIM card or cellular subscription, but only a device like a smartphone capable of receiving 5G Broadcast signals, thus bypassing telecommunication and cellular operators entirely. A stated advantage has been the ability to reduce load off mobile networks during large live broadcasts, and not requiring an internet connection. In a broadcast mode, data can be sent to multiple receivers at once (point-to-multipoint) as opposed to point-to-point.

The technology has been tested in numerous countries for a number of years, and has been tipped in Europe as the potential future for digital terrestrial television, which currently are mainly based on the DVB-T2 standard. Public broadcasters of France, Italy, Germany, the Netherlands, Ireland and Austria have signed a cooperation pact in 2023 and have stated the use of the UHF 470–694 MHz frequency band to be used for 5G Broadcast.

In September 2023 the specs of the standard was updated and published by the 3GPP organisation. It started being tested by some low-power television stations in the USA and also in Spain by UHD. In Germany, 5G Broadcast has been trialed and in May 2024 another pilot project is set to begin in the city of Halle. It is separate from the ATSC 3.0 transmission standard which is also being rolled out. In France, a trial is operated by TDF since the Paris 2024 Olympic games.

== Comparison with ATSC 3.0 ==
In comparison with ATSC 3.0, the "NextGenTV" IP-based broadcasting standard being introduced in the USA, 5G Broadcast has been criticised for lower bandwidth efficiency, and the lack of a future-proofing "bootstrap" signal to enable the introduction of new physical-level modulation profiles. However, 5G Broadcast was seen as having the advantage in most other aspects of performance.
