= MediaFLO =

Media transmission technology developed by Qualcomm

FLO TV logo

MediaFLO was a technology developed by Qualcomm for transmitting audio, video and data to portable devices such as mobile phones and personal televisions, used for mobile television. Qualcomm operated a mobile pay television service, FLO TV, from 2007 to 2011 using this technology.

Broadcast data transmitted via MediaFLO includes live, real time audio and video streams, as well as scheduled video and audio clips and shows. The technology could also carry Internet Protocol datacast application data, such as stock market quotes, sports scores, and weather reports.

In October 2010, Qualcomm announced it was suspending new sales of the service to consumers. In December 2010, AT&T announced that it will purchase Qualcomm's FCC licenses in the 700 MHz band. FLO TV discontinued service on March 27, 2011.

== History ==
Devices featuring MediaFLO were introduced by LG and Samsung at the 2006 Consumer Electronics Show. On December 1, 2005, Verizon Wireless and Qualcomm announced a partnership for the launch of the MediaFLO network.

=== Commercial rollout ===
MediaFLO-based pay TV services were first commercially offered on mobile phones. The service debuted on Verizon Wireless as V CAST Mobile TV in select cities on March 1, 2007, and rolled out nationwide throughout 2007 and 2008. AT&T announced a similar service in February 2007, intended to launch later that year; following delays, AT&T's MediaFLO TV service launched on May 4, 2008.

Qualcomm began selling FLO TV directly to consumers in November 2009 with the launch of the FLO TV Personal Television. The Personal Television was manufactured by HTC, and featured a 3.5" touchscreen. It retailed for US$249 at launch, and included a six-month FLO TV subscription; after the trial, a US$15 monthly subscription fee was required to use the service. Later, in August 2010, Audiovox introduced a FLO TV-equipped portable DVD player, which retailed for US$199.

From 2009 to 2010, Audiovox produced FLO TV systems for automobiles. The automotive FLO TV system was introduced by Chrysler in December 2009, as a Mopar dealer-installed accessory on 2010-model vehicles equipped with the Video Entertainment System. Chrysler also offered the FLO TV tuner as an aftermarket upgrade for 2008 and 2009-model vehicles sold with the system. Audiovox, under its Advent brand, began selling third-party automotive FLO TV systems through aftermarket equipment dealers in February 2010. FLO TV competed with Sirius Backseat TV.

=== Discontinuation ===
In July 2010, Qualcomm CEO Paul Jacobs stated that the company was suffering financial losses operating FLO TV, and planned to either sell MediaFLO or find a partner to continue its operation. The company reportedly discussed possible collaboration with software developers on other uses of the MediaFLO spectrum, which they stated could include distribution of electronic magazines or newspapers. The company had predicted the total cost to launch the service would be $800 million, including the $683 million that Qualcomm reportedly paid for the spectrum.

Qualcomm suspended sales of FLO TV to new customers on October 5, 2010, but stated that the service would remain available to existing customers through the spring of 2011. On October 12, Qualcomm stated that FLO TV would shut down on March 27, 2011. Qualcomm offered rebates to customers who purchased a FLO TV-equipped DVD player or Personal Television, which could be claimed until April 30, 2011. Chrysler also announced plans to reimburse customers who purchased a FLO TV system, though the system was reportedly only purchased by 851 Chrysler customers.

On December 20, 2010, AT&T announced that it would purchase Qualcomm's FCC licenses in the 700 MHz band for $1.93 billion. Despite spending $132 million in the previous quarter on bolstering FLO TV, Qualcomm still made a profit on the sale, as it had originally paid $38 million for the former channel 55 and $558 million for the former channel 56.

=== International trials ===
Some trials were underway in Japan, Hong Kong and Taiwan, with no commitment for a commercial release. In France, Qualcomm tried unsuccessfully to convince TDF to adopt MediaFLO technology. In the UK, British Sky Broadcasting conducted trials of MediaFLO in 2006.

== Programming ==
All U.S. MediaFLO providers offered a set of 14 basic channels:

- 2.FLO (6 a.m. to 10 p.m.) — Original made-for-mobile reports and concerts (added in early 2010)
- Adult Swim (10 p.m. to 6 a.m.)
- ABC Mobile
- CBS Mobile — Containing a mixture of sports and other CBS content
- CNBC
- Comedy Central
- ESPN Mobile TV — Frequently simulcasting live sporting events from their family of networks
- Fox Mobile
- Fox News Channel
- MTV Mobile
- MSNBC
- NBC 2Go (featuring a mix of programs from the NBC, MSNBC, CNBC, and Bravo networks)
- Disney Channel
- Nickelodeon

Adult Swim time-shared with 2.FLO, as it does on cable TV with Cartoon Network. Additionally, the "FLO Preview Channel" was a free-to-view barker channel, available without subscription.

Verizon offered those 14 channels, plus MTV Tres and TLC. AT&T, Personal Television, and Automotive systems offered the base 14, plus CNN Live Mobile and Crackle.

== Technology ==
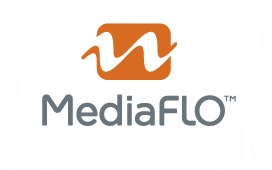
MediaFLO logo

The "FLO" in MediaFLO stood for Forward Link Only, meaning that the data transmission path is one way, from the tower to the device. The MediaFLO system transmitted data on a frequency separate from the frequencies used by current mobile telephone networks. In the United States, the MediaFLO system used frequency spectrum 716-722 MHz, which had previously been allocated to UHF TV channel 55.01Nov2004 Qualcomm press release regarding 700 MHz spectrum usage for MediaFLO

FLO was standardized within ETSI as TS 102 589, and has components standardized within the Telecommunications Industry Association (TIA 1099, 1102, 1103, 1104, 1120, 1130, 1132, 1146 and 1178.)

MediaFLO was a competitor to the Korean T-DMB, the Japanese 1seg and the European DVB-H standards.

Qualcomm conducted MediaFLO technical trials internationally, with the intention of forming partnerships with existing multi-channel content providers and service operators, but has since discontinued development.

The protocol was developed because of the inherent spectral inefficiency of unicasting high-rate full-motion video to multiple subscribers. Additionally, traditional analog television and over-the-air terrestrial digital television signals (DVB-T) were difficult to implement on mobile devices, due mostly to issues of power consumption. ATSC, used only by the United States and its neighbors, also has difficulty even with fixed reception due to multipath, and mobile ATSC-M/H (which is free-to-air from individual TV stations) was not finalized until 2008.

In addition, the transmission need not convey as high a resolution as would be needed for a larger display. MediaFLO streams are only 200-250 kbit/s, which would be insufficient for a larger screen size.

In the now defunct United States implementation, FLO was transmitted by a network of high-power broadcast transmitters operating at effective radiated powers as high as 50 kilowatts. This allowed for a coverage area of a transmitter to be as large as 30 to 40 kilometres (19 to 25 mi). The activation of many of these transmitters were delayed due to the official end of analog TV broadcasting on channel 55 being delayed. Immediately following the transition, the FLO network was expanded to several new markets, and coverage was enhanced in some existing ones.

The transmission was an encrypted OFDM set of QAM signals sent on a 5.55 MHz channel from 716 to 722 MHz (former UHF TV channel 55). The band was auctioned-off by the Federal Communications Commission (FCC) and known as the "Lower 700 MHz Block D". Qualcomm also bought, in a later auction, the use of former analog UHF TV channel 56 (722-728 MHz) in Boston, Los Angeles, New York, Philadelphia and San Francisco for additional services. However, this is owned by Manifest Wireless (a subsidiary of Dish Network's Frontier Wireless) in most other media markets, where ATSC-M/H signals were on air. All of the transmitters sent the same signal and used the same frequency, forming a single-frequency network. This allowed the mobile to decode the signal from more than one transmitter in the same way that it might if it was a multipath-delayed version from the same transmitter. All stations used callsign WPZA237, but each has an identifier indicating its group and number. For example, one station in the metro Atlanta media market was ATL-006, while another was ATL-014.

Some other operational parameters of MediaFLO are as follows:

Parameter	Value
Total number of QAM sub-carriers	4,096
Number of guard sub-carriers	96
Number of pilot sub-carriers	500
Multicast Logical Channels (MLC)	1–7
Modulations used	QPSK (4 symbol constellations), 16QAM (16 symbols)
Spacing between sub-carriers	1.355 kHz (5.55 MHz / 4,096 sub-carriers)
Modulated symbol (chip) duration	0.18 μs (1/5.55 MHz)

All of the bearer (data) traffic occurred within an MLC using the 3500 non-overhead subcarriers. The protocol also contemplates a certain amount of inter-symbol time spacing, to allow for the effects of multi-path transmission and reception.

Parameter	Value
Total OFDM symbol interval (T_{S})	833.33 μs
Bearer Data traffic (T_{U})	738.02 μs
Window interval (T_{WGI})	3.06 μs
Cyclic Prefix (T_{FGI})	92.25 μs

There is a window time T_{WGI} included both before and after each OFDM symbol. However, since this window is shared between each two consecutive symbols, T_{S} = T_{U} + T_{WGI} + T_{FGI}.

For conditional access, Verizon Wireless utilized its EVDO network to authenticate mobile handsets and provide the decryption keys necessary to decode the programming. Because of this, users who block data use to prevent unauthorized charge were also blocked from viewing any channels, including the preview channel.

== See also ==
- Mobile TV a term for the category of techniques
- DVB-H (Digital Video Broadcasting - Handheld)
- DVB (Digital Video Broadcasting)
- DMB (Digital Multimedia Broadcasting)
- DAB (Digital Audio Broadcasting)
- DRM (Digital Radio Mondiale)
- 1seg (mobile TV system on ISDB-T)
- ISDB-Tmm (Terrestrial mobile multi-media)
- Electronic program guide
