= China Multimedia Mobile Broadcasting =

Chinese TV standard similar to DVB-SH

China Mobile Multimedia Broadcasting (CMMB) is a mobile television and multimedia standard developed and specified in China by the State Administration of Radio, Film, and Television (SARFT). It is based on the Satellite and Terrestrial Interactive Multiservice Infrastructure (STiMi), developed by TiMiTech, a company formed by the Chinese Academy of Broadcasting Science. Announced in October 2006, it has been described as being similar to Europe's DVB-SH standard for digital video broadcast from both satellites and terrestrial repeaters to handheld devices.

It specifies usage of the S-band/U-band and occupies 25 MHz bandwidth within which it provides 25 video and 30 radio channels with some additional data channels. Multiple companies have chips that support CMMB standard - Innofidei who was the first with a solution 28 March 2007.

Other manufacturers, such as Unique Broadband Systems, were quick to enter the race and grab a share of the handheld broadcasting market with their hardware platform supporting both CMMB and DTMB (as well as others) standard waveforms.

== RF details ==
CMMB uses frequencies in the range 2635–2660 MHz (S-band) for satellite and "gap-filler" terrestrial broadcast, with additional terrestrial broadcast in the UHF band 470–862 MHz. The channel bandwidth can be either 2 or 8 MHz, depending on data rate.

== Coverage ==
China Satellite Mobile Broadcasting Corporation (CSMBC), as of 2 June 2010, had completed CMMB network coverage in 317 prefecture-level cities.

== Versus DTMB ==
- The CMMB is not a Chinese national standard (GB), but the DTMB is GB 20600-2006.
- The CMMB uses QCIF or QVGA, so can not broadcast the HDTV (1080i/1080p), but the DTMB can.
- The CMMB is intended for use on small screen devices (such as GPS, PDA, or smartphone...) in a mobile scenario, while DTMB is intended for use on large screen devices (such as PC, LCD TV, PDP TV...) in a fixed scenario.

== See also ==
- DTMB
- Digital Multimedia Broadcasting
- DVB (Digital Video Broadcasting)
- DVB-T (Digital Video Broadcasting - Terrestrial)
- DVB-H (Digital Video Broadcasting - Handheld)
- International standard
