= Interactive television standards =

Technical standards for interactive TV

Interactive television standards are standards for television broadcasting that are designed to add modes of interaction and feedback mechanisms, thereby extending the traditional television experience.

== History ==
Interactive television was first standardized in the 1980s with Teletext, used in analog television. This standard, which simply added data to invisible scan lines, allowed limited interaction with television sets to visualize extra textual and numerical information, such as show schedules and weather data, as well as optional subtitles. Today, the technology has developed to a point that allows for a more complex, bidirectional communication. Early private broadcasters, such as Canal+, were the first to adopt this new form and have continued to develop it over the years.

As the analog format became obsolete, the Digital Terrestrial Television (DTT) project was developed, which digitalized public television, in competition with private broadcasters. Among its new features was interactive menus, which (as in private broadcasting) gave information to the user and allowed them to adapt the product for their own needs.

This interaction is possible due to Set-top-Boxes (STBs), television decoders that are able to receive a digital signal, decode it, and display it through an analogue television set. This device allows analog users access to the same content as the digital television net. Running interactive programs is one of the STB's functions, among others.

STBs are required to be dynamically programmed and updated, often done by an intermediary software that runs both the applications and the audiovisual signals simultaneously. This intermediary software is referred to as middleware. Some STB systems allow updates via USB flash drives.

== Private standards or private property ==
=== Media Highway ===
Defined by Canal Plus Technologies, the media highway represents the wide range of middleware solutions that allow the STB software to do the following: interpret and execute interactive applications, broadcast software and data from servers to interactive applications via satellite, cable, and/or terrestrial nets. Other functions also include having different profiles to better respond to the needs of the broadcaster.

These interactive applications can be written in different programming languages as Java, MHEG-5 or HTML, and can support the middleware specifications DVB-MHP, OCAP, DAVIC or ATSC, and other specifications.

=== Open TV Core ===
Open TV Core is the most important product from Open TV, a middleware for digital television (DTV). The Open TV Core software technology contains a hardware abstraction layer (allowing the hardware to be independent), TV libraries (a selection of execution environments for the interactive applications), and support for Personal Video Recorders (PVRs), to create a DTT environment for the decoders (carried out by the STBs).

TV libraries include support for Rich Graphics (RG) and High Definition (HD), net communications from a phone line or a broadband internet provider (via DSL, ethernet or fibre), management for the digital audio and video signals (DVB or other standards and formats), and authentication/encryption via CA/DRM systems.

Open TV Core supports a number of Applications Environments Execution (AEE) programs, including the 'C' Virtual Machine (an HTML browser), an Adobe Flash presentation environment, and a Java Virtual Machine, in compliance with the MHP standard. The 'C' Virtual Machine is an execution environment that allows the APIs of the Open TV software Developers Kit to create applications in O code, centered on TV by via development tools from Open TV or other sellers.

== Open or public standards ==
=== MHEG ===
As early as 1995, the ISO (International Organization for Standardization), together with the Multimedia and Hypermedia Experts Group, published the MHEG standard. This gave an approach to the creation of multimedia applications that could work in every operative system in compliance with this standard. Conceptually, MHEG intended to do for multimedia application as HTML did for documents, to give a common exchange format that can be executed by every receiver.

MHEG-1: this version included support for objects containing procedure codes. One may add to the basic model of MHEG-1 by adding decision making functions, as it was not possible in any other way.

MHEG-3: this version defined a standard virtual machine and a byte representation code, giving it portability through hardware platforms.

These versions were unsuccessful because they were based on concepts that the industry was not technologically ready to execute. MHEG-5, a simpler version of MHEG-1, was created in April 1997. While many of the functions were identical, there were many differences between the two versions.

MHEG-3 was overshadowed by the success of Java, and in 1998, the ISO created MHEG-6, based on the fifth version but with added support for the use of Java to develop object scripts, combining MHEG with the procedural elements of Java. For this, they defined a Java application programming interface (API) for MHEG, allowing Java to manipulate MHEG objects in its mother application.

Though the MHEG-6 was not extended, it was the basis for the DAVIC's (Digital Audio Video Council) standard.

=== DAVIC ===
This standard was created a little later on after the MHEG-6 in 1998. It was created by adding a new series of APIs for Java to MHEG's sixth version. The APIs of the above-mentioned standard allowed the Java-created objects access to some information services, as well as control of audio and video services, and the management of resources in the receiver. Though the creation of an application was not possible with Java alone for the receiver DAVIC, the Java APIs were already capable of controlling more elements in the receiver than what was possible with other standards.

=== DVB-MHP (The Multimedia Home Platform) ===
This was defined by the Digital Video Broadcasting (DVB) to offer interactive services in digital television (DTV). It is a limited version of the Java virtual machine, where a set of extra functionalities are added to make adjustments to the DTV environment. To arrange this standard's specifications, there are three definable profiles, all relating to the capabilities of the STBs:

1. Interactive Broadcast: incorporates bidirectional communications via a backward IP channel towards the STB, allowing the download of applications.

2. Enhanced Broadcast Profile: interactive applications are downloaded via broadcasting. This does not incorporate a backward channel into the STB.

3. Internet Access: The STB itself processes internet content, without broadcasting.

There exist two versions that cover the mentioned profiles:

- MHP 1.0 covers the first two profiles. This version is used most by modern receivers, and the majority implement the Interactive Broadcast profile. Many countries such as Spain, Italy and Finland have adopted it into their DTV's interactive services.
- MHP 1.1 covers all three profiles, but it is not found in most commercial receivers because there are limited compatible protocols.

=== OCAP ===
The American company CableLabs collaborated with DVB for the creation of a new open standard, which led to the acceptance of MHP as a base for OCAP standard (OpenCable Application Platform), in January 2002. With MHP as its center, OCAP provides a common specification for the middleware layer in the cable systems within the United States. Since DVB standards are not used in the United States, OCAP is based on parts that are not DVB-specific, replacing DVB-specific parts with others. Originally, OCAP was based on the 1.0.0 version of the MHP standard.

Later, DVB presented the specification Globally Executable MHP (GEM) to facilitate the use of MHP's elements in other standards. OCAP's most recent versions use GEM instead of MHP as their base, but they still refer to some MHP elements that are not included in the GEM specification.

=== ACAP (Advanced Common Application Platform) ===
ACAP was created by the Advanced Television Systems Committee (ATSC) as a common base for all systems of interactive TV in USA, via cable, terrestrial, or satellite. It is also based on GEM while adding some of OCAP's elements adapted for the USA market.

== See also ==
- Hybrid Broadcast Broadband TV
- Project Canvas
- Open IPTV Forum
- Teletext
- Videotex
- Ceefax
- Minitel
