= Multimedia Home Platform =

Standard for interactive digital television

Multimedia Home Platform (DVB-MHP) is an open middleware system standard designed by the DVB project for interactive digital television. The MHP enables the reception and execution of interactive, Java-based applications on a TV set. Interactive TV applications can be delivered over the broadcast channel, together with audio and video streams. These applications can be for example information services, games, interactive voting, e-mail, SMS or shopping. MHP applications can use an additional return channel that has to support IP.

== Deployment ==
In May 2010 the largest deployments DVB-MHP are in Italy (DVB-T), Korea (DVB-S), Belgium (DVB-C) and Poland (DVB-S) with trials or small deployments in Germany, Spain, Austria, Colombia, Uruguay and Australia.

MHP service was also offered in Finland by Finnish Broadcasting Corporation (Yleisradio), but the service was shut down at the end of 2007 after technical failure. The shutdown wasn't ever officially announced. Ultimately the reason for the shutdown was that MHP never gained "critical mass". The main reasons for its lack of success in Finland were: 1) 50% of the Finnish households use the terrestrial network, where broadcasting of MHP applications can be really expensive, 2) TV broadcasters never told TV viewers about the MHP services—because the digitalization of the TV networks got extremely negative publicity in Finnish media, the broadcasters didn't want to upset their customers further if they had bought new expensive STBs which weren't capable of playing MHP apps, and 3) there were only a few MHP set-top boxes in the market—because Finland is such a small market, big manufacturers weren't interested in developing new MHP boxes just for Finland. MHP-capable STBs are no longer available in Finland.

The U.S. cable industry has specified its own middleware system referred as OCAP, which is largely based on MHP. Currently, Belgium's largest cable provider Telenet is rolling out their DVB-MHP system, called DigiBox. Norway's upcoming terrestrial digital TV network NTV will also use the DVB-MHP standard. In late 2008 the Info+ channel in Greece (part of the ERT Digital platform) started broadcasting DVB-MHP info, however since standards have not been set as of February 2009 for digital television in Greece, most TV sets and DVB-T receivers sold in the country do not feature DVB-MHP.

== Technology ==
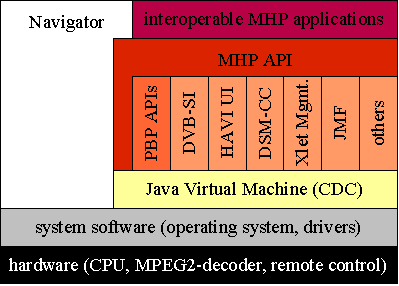
MHP software stack

The MHP specifies an extensive application execution environment for digital interactive TV, independent of the underlying, vendor-specific, hardware and software. This execution environment is based on the use of a Java virtual machine and the definition of generic APIs that provide access to the interactive digital TV terminal's typical resources and facilities. The interoperable MHP applications are running on top of these APIs. A so-called Navigator-application, which is part of the terminal software, allows the user the access to all MHP applications and other DVB services (like TV and radio). Sometimes Navigator can be also a Java program itself but that is not a requirement.

The MHP is just a part of a family of specifications, which all base on the Globally Executable MHP (GEM)-Standard, which was defined to allow the worldwide adoption of MHP.

== DVB-HTML ==
MHP applications come in two flavours. The first type are DVB-HTML applications. These are not very popular, partly because the specification for DVB-HTML was only completed with MHP 1.1, and partly because many broadcasters, box manufacturers and content developers find it too complex and difficult to implement. DVB-HTML applications are a set of HTML pages that are broadcast as part of a service. The spec is based around a modularized version of XHTML 1.1, and also includes CSS 2.0, DOM 2.0, and ECMAScript.

== DVB-J ==
The second, and by far the most popular flavour is DVB-J (DVB-Java) applications. These are written in Java using the MHP API set and consist of a set of class files that are broadcast with a service. DVB-Java applications are known as "Xlets". These are a concept similar to applets for Web pages that has been introduced by Sun in the JavaTV specification. Like applets, the xlet interface allows an external source (the application manager in the case of an MHP receiver) to start and stop an application.

== Return channel ==
The MHP set-top boxes may provide a backchannel for applications that wish to communicate with the outside world, for example a voting or shopping application. Typical upstream backchannels are phone line or broadband Internet connection (ADSL, or 56k in Italy, using a modem included in the set-top box). DVB-RCT (Return Channel Terrestrial) is a wireless technology utilizing the DVB infrastructure. It provides a VHF/UHF Wireless Return Channel back to the broadcaster for Interactive Terrestrial TV. It provides a data-rate of several kbit/s per user, for voting, polls, email, teleshopping, etc. If return channel is present it should provide IP with TLS support.

== See also ==
- MHEG-5
- Hybrid Broadcast Broadband TV (HbbTV), an alternative technology used for interactive television services via broadcasting and broadband communication media in some European countries.
- BD-J
- Interactive television
- IP over DVB
- OSGi
- Datacasting
- Telesoftware The invention upon which MHP is based.
