= SBS On Demand =

Australian streaming service

- Website type: Video on demand; Catch-up TV; Internet television
- Available in: English
- Headquarters: Artarmon, New South Wales, {{{location_country}}}
- Area served: Australia
- Owner: Special Broadcasting Service
- Services: streaming service
- Website: www.sbs.com.au/ondemand/
- Registration: Optional for livestreams required for on demand
- Launched: 1 September 2011; 15 years ago
- Current status: Active

SBS On Demand is an Australian free video on demand and catch-up TV service run by the Special Broadcasting Service. The service became available on 1 September 2011.

== Content and programming ==
SBS On Demand provides on-demand access to almost all the TV programs that are broadcast on the SBS's linear broadcast channels (SBS, SBS 2, SBS Food, SBS World Movies, and NITV), as well as simulcast live streams of those channels and original content and programs acquired exclusively for SBS On Demand.

- In late 2010s, a simulcast live stream of the main SBS channel and the digital channels was added to the On Demand website, iOS and Android apps.

== Third-party access ==
SBS On Demand is available across 22 platforms including iOS mobile operating systems (e.g. iPhone, iPad and iPod Touch), PlayStation 3 and PlayStation 4 via the PlayStation Network (now discontinued), Xbox 360, Windows 8, Sony internet-enabled TVs and Blu-ray players, LG internet-enabled TVs, Samsung internet-enabled TVs and Blu-ray players, Panasonic internet-enabled TVs, Hisense internet-enabled TVs, Humax set top boxes, Windows Mobile 7 and 8, and Samsung devices running Android OS 4.0+ and above.

=== Mobile devices ===
- Apple iPad (from 2011)
- Apple iPhone and iPod Touch (from 2011)
- Android phones and tablets on Android v5.0 and above

=== Smart TVs ===
- Sony Bravia
- Samsung Smart TVs ("Orsay") (from 2011) and Samsung Tizen OS (from 2015)
- Panasonic Viera Cast (from 2011)
- LG Netcast (from 2011) and WebOS (from 2014)
- FreeviewPlus certified (HbbTV) devices (from 2014)
- Hisense Smart TVs (from February 2020)

=== Video game consoles ===
- Microsoft Xbox 360 (from 2011–2017)
- Microsoft Xbox One (from 2015–2018)
- Sony PlayStation 3 (from 2012–2017)
- Sony PlayStation 4 (from 2014–2017)

=== Media streamers ===
- Foxtel IQ (from 2019)
- Fetch TV (from 2013)
- Chromecast devices

== See also ==
- Internet television in Australia
- List of streaming media services
