= OpenCaster =

- Developer: Avalpa Digital Engineering s.r.l.
- Release: 2008
- Written in: C, Python
- Operating system: Debian
- Available in: Multilingual with English manual
- Type: multiplexing
- License: GNU General Public License v2 or later
- Website: www.avalpa.com/the-key-values/15-free-software/33-opencaster
- Repository: https://github.com/aventuri/opencaster

OpenCaster is a collection of open-source and free software for the Debian Linux system to play out and multiplex MPEG transport streams. OpenCaster generates most of the non audio/video data present into transport streams and handles playout of pre-encoded audio/video files or can be integrated with third parties audio/video encoders.

== Common use cases ==
- Table generator (PSI/SI and EPG)
- Interactive TV standards DSMCC object carousel broadcast (MHP, MHEG5, HbbTv, ...)
- Multiplexing of input multicast UDP MPEG transport stream to output multicast UDP transport stream
- Playout of locally stored, offline encoded audio and video for non-live TV and/or radio stations
- VOD system based on mpeg2 transport stream over IP or over DVB-* for walled garden network like hotels with coax
- DVB-SSU update for decoders OTA
- Teletext generator

== Design principles ==
OpenCaster supports Interprocess communication among its different tools using Named pipes and enabling a high level of customization with shell scripts. The pipe paradigm has been criticized for performance, but the performance loss may be accepted for the ability to customize.

Table generation is performed with serialization of a natural language description in Python and already features a large number of descriptors from different digital television standards. Adding new descriptors to the library is simple, and only requires knowledge of how the packet is specified bit by bit.

== History ==
Originally tests were done in Cineca as part of a research project under a different name targeting broadcast of DSMCC file system for MHP interactive television but the project was already started from works by German National Research Center for Information Technology. The first service featuring OpenCaster DSMCC was broadcast on air in Italy in 2003. The first non-live DVB service 100% generated by OpenCaster and open source mpeg2 encoders is operating on air since 2004. OpenCaster was presented at the 16th ACM international conference on Multimedia since then has been used also in other researches: DVB-T DIGITAL TV TANSMITTER BASED SOFTWARE, MHP Conformance test, Building of an HbbTV demonstrator a project in collaboration with European Broadcasting Union, Open Source End-2-End DVB-H Mobile TV services and network infrastructure — The DVB-H pilot in Denmark. OpenCaster was used in the HbbTV Test suite in 2014 and has been cited as tool in From the Aether to the Ethernet – Attacking the Internet using Broadcast Digital Television

== Integration ==
OpenCaster has been integrated with a long list of broadcasting products, among them there are products by Adtec, Cisco/Scientific Atlanta, Deltacast, Dektec, Ericsson/Tandberg Television, Eurotek, Harmonic/Scopus, MainConcept, Mitan, Screen Service, Sr-Systems, Wellav, ...

== Testing ==
OpenCaster has been tested with Rohde & Schwarz DVM100L and DVM 400 and it is continuously tested with Dektec StreamXpert
