= List of smart TV platforms =

The following list encompasses notable smart TV platforms and application software that are used as software framework and middleware platforms used by more than just one manufacturer.

== Smart TV middleware providers to multiple third parties ==
For TV sets and companion boxes vendors, available under OEM license.

=== Smart TV framework platforms managed by standards bodies or technology consortia ===
Framework	Managed by	Comments
Hybrid Broadcast Broadband TV (HbbTV)	HbbTV Association	HTML5-based application framework middleware software platform provided by the Association
CE-HTML	Consumer Electronics Association (CEA)	As part of Web4CE
Open IPTV Forum (OIPF)	Open IPTV Forum	As of June 2014, OIPF is part of HbbTV Association
Tru2way	CableLabs	

=== Smart TV framework platforms managed by one company or foundation ===
Framework	Managed by	Used by	Comment
Android TV	Google	Airtel (Xstream Box, Xstream Stick and Internet TV); AIS (Playbox); Akari; Asianet; Asus; Bang & Olufsen; Benq; Bouygues Telecom (Bbox Miami); CCC Mobile (Air Stick); ChannelMaster; DirecTV; Dish; Epson; First Media (X1, X1-4K, X1 Prime, X1 Prime-c, X1 Prime-i and One Stream); Free/Iliad (Freebox Mini 4K); Hathway; KIVI; Hisense; Hitachi; Grundig; KDDI; LeEco (Super4 X Series); LG HelloVision; LG Uplus; Motorola; Nex Parabola (NexVidio); Nokia; NVIDIA (Shield TV); OnePlus; Onida; Panasonic; PCCW (Now E); Philips; Polytron; RCA; Realme; Sharp; Skyworth; Sony; StarHub (StarHub Go Streaming Box, StarHub TV+ Box and StarHub TV+ Pro); Tata Play (binge+); TCL/Thomson; Technicolor; Telekom Malaysia (Unifi Plus Box); Telkom Indonesia (IndiHome); TiVo (Stream 4K); Toshiba; TVB (myTV SUPER Box and TVB Anywhere Android TV Box); Verizon (Stream TV); Vestel; Vu Televisions; Westinghouse; WeWatch; Xiaomi; ZTE	Gives access to Android apps through the Play Store.
Boxee	Boxee, Inc	D-Link	Popular fork of the Kodi/XBMC media center software with custom graphical user interface and some proprietary application framework for apps.
Fire TV	Amazon	Element; Fire TV; Grundig; Insignia; JVC; Hisense; Panasonic; TCL; Toshiba; Westinghouse	FormerlyAndroid-based platform.
Firefox OS for TV, My Home Screen	Mozilla	Panasonic	Panasonic's Smart TVs, including their new 4K TVs, continue to feature Mozilla's open source Firefox OS, despite Mozilla lowering its development priority on developing the operating system. Panasonic is continuing to develop their fork, calling it My Home Screen while Mozilla has stated that they will continue to support and work with Panasonic
Frog	Wyplay	SFR	Used by some IPTV operators, such as SFR in France on its set-top-box
Google TV (original; not to be confused with the eponymous user interface released in 2020)	Google	Asus; Hisense; KIVI; LG; Logitech; Netgear; SFR; Sony; TCL; Vizio; Onn. from Walmart	Android-based platform; Its development ended in 2013; it is replaced by Chromecast and Android TV.
Horizon TV	Liberty Global		A cross-platform platform based fork of the Kodi/XBMC media center software with proprietary middleware framework for video on demand and handling DRM for streaming cable television channels.
httvLink	HTTV	Kaon; Pace; Sagemcom; Smit	HbbTV-compliant
Inview	Inview Technology Ltd	Digifusion; Thomson; Sony	Connects an ordinary TV (or set-top box) to get IPTV.
JRiver	JRiver		Runs on Windows, macOS, Linux, and Android. Features similar to Plex or Kodi. Closed source.
Kodi Entertainment Center (formerly XBMC – Xbox Media Center)	XBMC Foundation		Kodi/XBMC is royalty-free and cross-platform. The core code is written in C++ and is open-source licensed under GNU GPL v2. It offers the possibility for easy rebranding by an original design manufacturer (ODM) or original equipment manufacturer (OEM), with customizing of interface look and feel using skins, and simple plug-ins from third-party developers, available via Python scripts for content extensions. Due to these reasons, many systems integrators have created modified versions of Kodi, along with a Just enough operating system (JeOS) made for Kodi/XBMC that are used as mostly a software appliance suite in a variety of devices including smart TVs, set-top boxes, digital signage, hotel television systems, in-flight entertainment platforms, and network connected digital media players.
MeeGo	Nokia, The Linux Foundation		Middleware for smart TV. Now split into Tizen, Mer, and Sailfish OS) (Linux Foundation, Intel, AMD), currently based on a derivative fork of Kodi/XBMC media center software
Mediaroom	Ericsson (formerly Microsoft)	Offered by 90 operators worldwide	Middleware for pay-TV operators
OpenTV	Nagravision	BSkyB (UK); Sky Italia (Italy); Digital+ (Spain); Numericable (France); EchoStar (US)	Middleware for pay-TV operators
TiVo OS	TiVo (part of Xperi)	Vestel; Daewoo; Regal; Hitachi; Telefunken; JVC	Independent, neutral media platform that is content-first and respects OEMs branding.
Vewd (formerly Opera TV)	Vewd (part of Xperi)	Hisense; Mediatek; Humax; Samsung; Sony; Swisscom; Vestel	
VIDAA	VIDAA International	Hisense; Toshiba; Polytron; Sharp; Many other OEMs	Smart TV operating system giving access to 250+ global & local content apps.
Oregan Media Browser 5	Oregan Networks	British Telecom; Telefónica; NTT	Middleware for pay-TV operators, deployed by large telecoms and cable operators such as BT and Telefónica on hybrid STBs.
Plex	Plex		Closed-source cross-platform media center with proprietary streaming functionality to numerous devices. Started out as a popular fork of the Kodi/XBMC media center software.
PowerUp Suite	Zodiac Interactive	Cablevision (Altice); Charter Communications; Rogers	Middleware, presentation engine, low level adaptation, back office mediation for Tier 1 through Tier 3 pay TV operators
Roku OS	Roku, Inc.	Aiwa; AOC; Atvio from Walmart; Britânia; Caixun; CHiQ; coocaa; Daewoo; Element Electronics; FFALCON; Haier; Hisense; Hitachi; HKPro; InFocusTV; Insignia; JVC; LG; Magnavox; METZ blue; onn. from Walmart; Philco; Philips; Polaroid; RCA; Roku; Sansui; Sanyo; Sharp; Spectra; TCL; Westinghouse	Roku OS is an operating system that runs on Roku branded smart TVs, streaming players, and smart speakers. Roku calls it a "customized user experience built on top of an embedded Linux kernel".
RDK (Reference Development Kit)	RDK Management, LLC	Cisco; Comcast; Humax; Pace; Sky; Hubbl (Foxtel)	
Smart TV Alliance	Smart TV Alliance	LG; Panasonic (VieraConnect); Philips / TP Vision; Toshiba (CloudTV)	A common SDK for TV app development and publishing for TV vendors.
Titan OS	Titan Operating System, S.L.	Philips (TP Vision)	Newly created OS with focus on advertising
Tizen OS	Samsung	Samsung	For newer Samsung TVs
ToFu Media Platform	Pivos	Pivos; PlayJam	Cross-platform fork of Kodi/XBMC media center licensed to third parties and other commercial partners as OEM.
Ubuntu TV	Canonical		Ubuntu operating system based platform, with Unity Next user interface for TV.
Virtuoso	RCA	RCA	A closed source operating system that supports only 2.4 GHz Wi-Fi, offers apps Netflix, Twitter, YouTube, Facebook, Pandora, Accuweather and Mirracast screen share.
webOS	LG	LG	Open source, Linux kernel-based operating system for smart devices, such as smart TVs.
Yahoo! Smart TV (formerly Yahoo! Connected TV)	Yahoo!	Mediatek; Samsung; Sony; Trident; Toshiba; Vizio (Internet Apps Plus)	
Shijiu TV	Shijiu, Inc	Samsung; LG; TCL; Skyworth; Alibaba; various OTT boxes	Middleware for internet TV. A cross-platform high-performance OpenGL based HTML5 engine licensed to third parties and other commercial partners as OEM. Also known as 'QCast'.

== Smart TV platforms utilized by vendors ==
Includes first and third-party solutions.

Vendor	Platform	Devices
Aiwa	Roku OS	For TV sets sold in Mexico and elsewhere from 2022 onwards.
Amazon	Fire TV	For Fire TV devices, including Fire TV Stick.
AOC	Roku OS	For TV sets sold in Brazil, Chile, Peru and elsewhere from 2020 onwards.
Apple	tvOS	For Apple TV devices. iOS-based, with an app store. For Apple TV generation 4 and later.
Apple	Apple TV Software	For Apple TV devices, generations 1 to 3. iOS-based. Initially based on Mac OS X Tiger and Front Row.
Atvio from Walmart	Roku OS	For TV sets sold in Mexico and elsewhere from 2019 onwards.
Britânia	Roku OS	For TV sets sold in Brazil and elsewhere.
Caixun	Roku OS	For TV sets sold in Chile
Cello	webOS	For TV sets sold in United Kingdom
CHiQ	Roku OS	For TV sets sold in Germany
coocaa	Roku OS	For TV sets sold in Germany and elsewhere.
Daewoo	Roku OS	For TV sets sold in Mexico and elsewhere from 2022 onwards.
Element Electronics	Roku OS	For TV sets sold in the US and elsewhere.
FFALCON	Roku OS	For TV sets sold in Australia
Google	Chromecast	For Chromecast HDMI dongles.
Haier	Roku OS	For TV sets.
Hisense	Android TV	For TV sets.
Hisense	Roku OS	For TV sets sold in the US, Canada, Mexico, the UK and elsewhere.
Hisense	VIDAA / VIDAA U	For TV sets.
Hitachi	Roku OS	For TV sets sold in the US and elsewhere.
HKPro	Roku OS	For TV sets sold in the Mexico and elsewhere.
Huawei/Honor	HarmonyOS	For TV sets.
InFocusTV	Roku OS	For TV sets sold in the US and elsewhere.
Insignia	Roku OS	For TV sets sold in the US and elsewhere.
JVC	Roku OS	For TV sets sold in the US, Canada, Mexico and elsewhere.
LG	webOS Smart TV	Current solution for TV sets. Used on Smart TVs released after 2014.
LG	NetCast	Former solution for TV sets. Used on Smart TVs released before 2014.
LG	Roku OS	For TV sets sold in the US and elsewhere.
Magnavox	Roku OS	For TV sets.
METZ blue	Roku OS	For TV sets sold in Germany, the UK and elsewhere.
Microsoft	Xbox One	For Xbox One game console. More Smart TV features and TV apps expected with the Windows 10 update, that include the Windows Universal App Store.
Microsoft	Xbox 360	For Xbox 360 game console, with smart TV features.
Netgear	NeoTV	For NeoTV streaming players.
Nvidia	Android TV	For Nvidia Shield TVs.
onn. from Walmart	Roku OS	For TV sets sold in the US, Canada, Mexico and elsewhere.
Polaroid	Roku OS	For TV sets sold in Mexico, the UK and elsewhere from 2023 onwards.
Panasonic	Viera Cast and Viera Connect	For TV sets. The newer TV models now use the Firefox OS TV platform (no longer vendor specific).
Panasonic	My Home Screen	For TV sets.
Panasonic	Android TV	For TV sets. Since 2020.
Panasonic	Fire TV	For TV sets. Since 2023.
Philco	Roku OS	For TV sets sold in Brazil and elsewhere from 2021 onwards.
Philips	Android TV	For TV sets.
Philips	Roku OS	For TV sets in the US, Canada, Mexico and elsewhere.
Philips	Net TV	Former solution for TV sets. The newer TV models use the Android TV platform
RCA	Roku OS	For TV sets in the US, Argentina, Australia, Canada, the UK and elsewhere.
Roku	Roku OS	For Roku TV sets. Also for Roku TV Streaming Sticks and Players.
Samsung	Tizen OS for TV	For newer TV sets.
Samsung	Samsung Smart TV (Orsay OS)	Former solution for TV sets and connected Blu-ray players. Now replaced by Tizen OS.
Sansui	Roku OS	For TV sets sold in Mexico and elsewhere from 2022 onwards.
Sanyo	Roku OS	For TV sets sold in the US, Mexico and elsewhere.
Sharp	Android TV	For TV sets.
Sharp	AQUOS NET+	Former solution for TV sets.
Sharp	Roku OS	For TV sets sold in the US, Germany, Mexico, the UK and elsewhere.
Sharp	SmartCentral	Former solution for TV sets.
Sony	Android TV	For TV sets.
Sony	PlayStation TV with Sony Entertainment Network	For PlayStation game console.
Sony	Sony Internet TV (Sony Apps)	Former solution for TV sets. The newer TV models use the Android TV platform (no longer vendor specific).
Spectra	Roku OS	For TV sets sold in Mexico and elsewhere.
TCL	Android TV	For TV sets. The newer TV models use the Roku TV platform
TCL	Roku OS	For TV sets sold in the US, Australia, Brazil, Canada, Germany, Mexico, the UK and elsewhere.
TCL	Smart TV 2	Former solution for TV sets.
TiVo	TiVo	For TiVo DVR box.
Toshiba	Android TV	For TV sets.
Toshiba	Toshiba Places	Former solution for TV sets.
Toshiba	VIDAA	For TV sets
Sling Media	Slingbox	For Slingbox set-top-boxes.
Skyworth	Android TV	For TV sets.
Vizio	Vizio OS	For TV sets.
Western Digital	WD TV	For WD TV boxes.
Westinghouse	Android TV	For TV sets.
Westinghouse	Fire TV	For TV sets.
Westinghouse	Roku OS	For TV sets sold in the US, Canada and elsewhere.
Westinghouse	Samba TV	Former solution for TV sets.
Xiaomi	PatchWall based on Android	For TV sets in mainland China, India, Indonesia
Xiaomi	Android TV	For TV sets in global markets (models: 5ASP/5ARU/6ARG), Mi Box line of set top boxes and Xiaomi TV Stick line of streaming dongles.
Xiaomi	Fire TV	For TV sets in global markets

== See also ==
- Smart TV
- Digital media player
- Home theater PC
- Comparison of digital media players
- Next Generation Broadcasting Network TVOS, a Chinese-only operating system announced in December 2008
