= UK Profile of MHEG-5 =

The UK Profile of MHEG-5 is a technical specification describing how the MHEG-5 language is used to provide interactive television services. It was developed to provide interactive services for the UK digital terrestrial television platform by a group of broadcasters including the BBC and ONdigital. The specification has undergone a number of revisions. Version 1.06 was published on 15 May 2003 but has since been amended with corrigenda.
