= JMF =

JMF may refer to:

- Jack Ma Foundation, a Chinese philanthropic organization
- Java Media Framework, software
- Joe Montana Football, an American football video game
- John Moriarty Football, an organisation supporting Indigenous Australian footballers
- Juan Manuel Fangio, an Argentinian race car driver
- June Mar Fajardo, a Filipino basketball player
- Royal Johor Military Force, a military unit in Malaysia
