= Panasonic DMP-BD60 =

- Manufacturer: Panasonic
- Product family: DMP
- Type: Media player
- Released: April 2009
- Media: Blu-ray
- Dimensions: 430 x 249 x 49 mm (Note: Including the projecting parts)
- Weight: Approx. 2.6 kg
- Predecessor: DMP-BD35

The Panasonic DMP-BD60 is Panasonic's Blu-ray player released in 2009.

== Features ==
The player has Viera Cast functionality and is compatible with DivX as well as Blu-ray Profile 2.0. It features an SD card slot and a USB port. Additionally, the player can be modified to enable playback of discs from all regions.

== Reception ==
What Hi-Fi? called it "A solid player, but not a significant enough improvement over last year's model and overtaken now by newer rivals". CNET concluded: "If speed is what you need, get a Samsung machine. If a sturdy build, excellent features and awesome picture and sound quality are what you want, get the DMP-BD60." Another reviewer for CNET said: "The DMP-BD60's strength is its rock-solid performance, but if you're looking for the latest and greatest features you'll have to look elsewhere." Trusted Reviews called it a "feature-packed player that offers sensational picture performance and a user-friendly operating system". PCMag said that the "DMP-BD60 isn't a compelling upgrade for owners of the DMP-BD35". TechRadar said: "Thanks to its extensive feature list and sensational performance, the DMP-BD60 offers excellent value for money." Sound & Vision said the player has exceptional video processing.
