= Two-way television =

Two-way television can refer to:

- an early name (one of more than a dozen different ones) used for videophones during the period of the 1920s to the 1960s,
- a name commonly used for interactive television.

Less commonly, it can also refer to:

- Closed-circuit television
