= Television app =

Television app or TV app may refer to:

- Over-the-top media service, which offers content such as television shows directly to viewers via the Internet and is typically accessed via an app on an electronic device
- Software program on a small handheld or mobile device used to view mobile television
- Software program that runs on a smart TV platform
  - List of smart TV platforms
- TV (app), a line of software programs by Apple Inc. for viewing television shows on consumer electronic devices
