= LOVEStv =

Spanish catch-up TV service

- Company type: Joint venture
- Area served: Spain
- Founders: RTVE; Atresmedia; Mediaset España
- Industry: Entertainment
- Launched: 28 November 2018

LOVEStv is a free Spanish catch-up TV service jointly participated by RTVE, Atresmedia and Mediaset España based on a HbbTV standard.

Announced in June 2018, when test broadcasting started, it was formally launched on 28 November 2018. Prior to the introduction of LOVEStv HbbTV technology had been previously employed in Spain by RTVE. RTVE (the Spanish public broadcaster), Atresmedia and Mediaset España are competitors in the generalist TV sector. All three partners announced at the time of the presentation that the service was envisioned to transition into an OTT service in a second phase. It offers viewers seven-day catch-up of programming broadcast by the channels of the three platforms and the option of watching an ongoing program from the start.

The service requires internet connection, television models able to support a HbbTV 1.5 standard and the manufacturer making the service available on the TV receiver.
