= BBC Red Button =

Interactive television service

- BBC Red Button logo since October 2021
- Country: United Kingdom

Programming
- Language: English
- Picture format: 576i (16:9 SDTV); 1080i (HDTV)

Ownership
- Owner: BBC
- Sister channels: BBC One; BBC Two; BBC Three; BBC Four; BBC News; BBC Parliament; CBBC; CBeebies; BBC Scotland; BBC Alba

History
- Launched: 23 September 1999; 27 years ago
- Replaced: Ceefax
- Former names: BBC Text (1999–2001); BBCi (2001–2008) (Note: The BBCi branding is still used in asset links on the BBC website and the RSS feed for BBC News.)

Links
- Website: Archived 2016-07-08 at the Wayback Machine

Availability

Terrestrial
- Freeview: 250 (interactive version)
- 601 (other)

BBC Red Button is a brand used for digital interactive television services provided by the BBC, and broadcast in the United Kingdom. The services replaced Ceefax, the BBC's analogue teletext service.

== History and branding ==
The service was launched on 23 September 1999 as BBC Text. It was relaunched in November 2001 under the BBCi brand and operated under this name until late 2008, when it was rebranded as BBC Red Button. The "red button" name refers to the common interface on remote controls for digital televisions and set-top boxes, a red push-button that launches digital teletext services.

Although initially marketed as a spectacular new form of television, by 2008 this had given way to positioning interactive television as 'everyday'. This was due in part to the institutional landscape of television in the UK.

In September 2009, the BBC celebrated 10 years of the digital interactive TV service.

BBC Red Button's text services were due to close on 30 January 2020, but the switch-off was suspended on 29 January 2020 following protests.

=== BBC Text (1999–2001) ===
BBC Text originally launched on digital terrestrial services on 23 September 1999, and was later introduced on satellite and cable platforms. In the first phase, the service was created using content migrated from the existing analogue teletext service, Ceefax. A digital text service had been available since the launch of digital terrestrial television in November 1998, but the BBC Text service was not publicly launched until November 1999, due to a lack of availability of compatible set-top boxes.

BBC Text was considerably more advanced than Ceefax, in that it offered a richer visual interface, with the possibility of photographic images and designed graphics (as opposed to Ceefax graphics which were composed of simple blocks of colour). BBC Text also enabled channel association, the ability for the user to retain their selected television channel visible in one section of the screen whilst viewing the text service, in contrast to Ceefax, which could only be viewed as a full-screen display, or as a semitransparent overlay (i.e. opaque blocks of colour on top of the television channel, with the black background now transparent; not 'translucent blocks of colour with a translucent black background') above the television picture. The original text service had no return path, this being made available in later phases.

BBC Text pioneered an early form of "on-demand" interactive television, called Enhanced TV. During the 1999 Wimbledon Championships, the BBC presented a service that allowed viewers to select a video stream of different matches, and access additional information such as player profiles, scores and interactive quizzes. Although the experimental service was publicly available, there were no digital set-top boxes or receivers available on the market that could decode the signal, and the service was presented to the public only via BBC demonstrations using prototype receivers.

=== The BBCi brand (2001–2008) ===
BBCi TV i-bar, 2001

BBCi website navbar, 2004

The BBCi brand launched in November 2001 and was conceived as a cohesive multi-platform brand name for all the BBC's digital interactive services, encompassing the corporation's digital teletext, interactive television and website services. According to the BBC, the "i" in BBCi stood for "interactivity" as well as "innovation".

The various services all took on a common interface device, an "i-bar" branded with the BBCi logo, which sought to emphasise the brand across different technologies by providing similar navigation. For example, the BBC website, which had previously been called BBC Online, took on the BBCi brand from 2001, displaying an i-bar across the top of every page, offering category-based navigation: Categories, TV, Radio, Communicate, Where I Live, A-Z Index, and a search. Similarly, BBC interactive television services all offered a horizontal i-bar along the bottom of television screens, with four colour-coded interactions linked to the four colour buttons on TV remote controls.

In 2003 some minor changes were made to the service, which saw a new "bridge"-style home page (the current style still used today) replacing the previous i-bar, and all sections remained the same as before, but their headings along the top of the screen were colour-coded rather than using a single shade of blue. A further revamp took place in 2004 which saw a new look to all the section pages, as well as the introduction of Ceefax-style page numbers and an index page, replacing the previous BBCi menu, and an option to press "0" on the remote control to switch between the service and full screen TV. The previous home page was also retained in line with the new look, but with the "MAIN MENU" option becoming "INDEX". More changes took place in 2005, which included a new BBCi logo and another new "bridge"-style home page — which, unlike the previous home page, doesn't show any references of the current channel and programme, as it instead features MHEG text overlays giving highlights of the service. Additionally, new "Fastext" style buttons were introduced, and the colour scheme of the index page has changed from blue to black.

After three years of consistent use across different platforms, the BBC began to drop the BBCi brand gradually; on 6 May 2004, the BBC website was renamed bbc.co.uk, after the main URL used to access the site. Interactive TV services continued under the BBCi brand until late 2008.

=== The BBC Red Button brand (2008) ===
From 2008, the BBC gradually began to drop the BBCi name from its digital interactive TV services also, replacing it with the name BBC Red Button. The BBCi logo continued in on-screen presentation for some time.

=== BBC Red Button HD ===
In June 2013, a HD version of BBC Red Button was launched for the summertime. It closed on 25 November 2013 after the 50th anniversary of Doctor Who. It returned each year along with the other BBC Red Button channels as a temporary channel for the duration of the Wimbledon tennis tournament. On 26 March 2018, CBBC HD began its downtime and the relaunch of BBC Red Button HD took place to cover the 2018 Commonwealth Games. It was added on Sky on channel 981 and Freeview channel 602 on 3 April 2018 and closed on 16 April 2018 after the Games had concluded. Later in 2021, it was originally supposed to be closed on the end of Wimbledon but was kept on air for the 2020 Olympics.

On 15 February 2023, as part of the BBC's plan to upgrade all of its channels to high-definition as standard, the high-definition video feed of BBC Red Button was made the default on all television platforms, replacing the long-standing "standard definition" feed which was used outside of significant sporting events.

=== BBC Connected Red Button (2012) ===
BBC Connected Red Button launched in December 2012 on Virgin TiVo and on some Freeview and Freesat 'Smart TVs' in December 2013. The service is a composite IP and broadcast service and may be the future of Red Button on internet connected televisions.

==== BBC Red Button+ (2015) ====
BBC Red Button+ logo

The service was renamed BBC Red Button+ in April 2015. It launched with an updated brand.

=== Partial closure (2020) ===
After nearly 21 years of service, the BBC announced in 2019 that due to financial cuts, the text services on Red Button on all platforms would be removed from 30 January 2020. The video services, used during events like Wimbledon and the Olympic Games, however, would continue.

On 29 January 2020, the BBC announced their suspension of the switch-off due to protests, one day before the service was due to have started being phased out. This announcement comes following a petition, organised by the National Federation of the Blind of the UK (NFBUK), which was submitted to the BBC and Downing Street. The petition expresses NFBUK's concerns with the switch-off, citing that the service is "vital for visually impaired, deaf, disabled and older people, as well as many other people who want to find out information independently in an easy, convenient and accessible format, who are not online." They're concerned that the withdrawal of the service would leave many already vulnerable people into further isolation and marginalisation from society. NFBUK states they cannot understand how the BBC can meet their obligations set in the Royal Charter following the cut of the Red Button Teletext service.

== Availability ==
BBC Red Button is available on all digital television platforms in the UK, including digital cable through Virgin Media, digital satellite through Sky and Freesat and digital terrestrial television through Freeview. On Freeview interactivity does not permit users to submit data (such as answering questions in a quiz or requesting video on demand), as the platform does not provide a return path.

The BBC currently provides one video stream to all platforms, which can be accessed directly from Freeview channel 601, Freesat channel 980, Sky channel 970 (UK only) and Virgin Media UK channel 991. Until mid-February 2023, the feed provided was only in standard definition, with a high-definition version of RB 1 (the primary feed) used for high-profile sporting events, which included the Olympics and Wimbledon. Since 15 February 2023 the standard definition feed has been replaced across all platforms with a high-definition version, as part of the BBC's plan to upgrade its channel offering into high-definition. One advantage of the feed is the DVR ability as the conventional Red Button interaction restricts DVR record / pause / rewind functions, and is a major caveat for many.

Prior to 2023, the BBC had the ability to increase the amount of streams during major events and had done so on numerous occasions, as follows:

- 2012 Olympics: For the 2012 Summer Olympics in London, the BBC provided 24 live streams in standard and high-definition for the duration of the games. Additional online streams could also be accessed through the internet-connected BBC Red Button+.
- 2016 Olympics: eight red button video streams were broadcast to all platforms during the 2016 Olympics. This was in addition to BBC Four continually broadcasting Olympic coverage and either BBC One or BBC Two broadcasting main coverage during the course of the each day.
- The Championships, Wimbledon: six additional channels were provided for a variety of outer courts. Red Button 1 was duplicated in high definition, with RB 2 to RB 6 only in standard definition. The 2022 edition of the tournament was the last to offer this functionality.

As of 2023, the BBC will no longer be providing additional Red Button streams for any events. Instead, it will be directing viewers to watch additional feeds via the BBC iPlayer. 2023 Wimbledon was the first major tournament not to provide any additional feeds on linear television.

BBC Red Button 1 HD (originally launched as SD only) is a channel available on Freeview, Freesat, Sky, and Virgin Media. It showcases many live events, such as live music (especially from BBC Radio live shows) and sports like football and rugby. It also features an extended version of Final Score, offering more in-depth analysis of the matches they cover. When the BBC announced the closure of all their SD channels on satellite, BBC Red Button 1 became permanently HD for the first time in its history (it was occasionally in HD for certain events like Wimbledon). Virgin Media followed suit by adding BBC Red Button 1 HD to their service and removing the SD version.

== Content ==
BBC Red Button homepage

Generally, BBC Red Button offers text and video based services, as well as enhanced television programmes which offer extra information, video or quizzes.

In September 2005, BBCi launched an update to the interactivity available from the BBC's Radio channels on Freeview. Originally only Radiotext was available. After the update, users could access information about the programme, schedules, news, sport and weather. From 2005, Freeview users could access the CBBC Extra video stream.

The same team behind the BBC's digital text service also launched the early incarnations of the BBC's Interactive Wimbledon and Interactive Open Golf services in 2000, which were awarded an Interactive BAFTA that year.

The News Multiscreen was removed from the digital service in October 2009, to make room for future Freeview HD broadcasts.

As of July 2022, the Question Time page on p155 appears to be outdated since January 2018, as it still states that the show will be returning on 11 January from Islington.

Here is a table of the contents of the BBC Red Button as of March 2023:

Numbers	Name	Category	Notes
100	Home Page	—N/a	
101	News Headlines	News	Index of all stories on p104
102	News Index	News	Index of categories in News Section
104	Top News Story	News	Use left and right buttons to scroll through all stories indexed on 101, stories no longer have their own page
144	Index of all UK Political stories	—N/a	
153	Technology	News	
154	Science	News	
155	Question Time	News	Unedited since January 2018
160	Around the UK	—N/a	Index of UK Regional News sections
199	Index of all sections	—N/a	
200	Business	Business	Loans & Home and Savings were removed from the Business pages in May 2012.
201	Business news	Business	
204	Business top story	Business	
220	Shares	Business	
230	Markets	Business	
240	Currencies - Foreign Exchange	Business	
300	Sport index	Sport	
301	Sports news	Sport	
302	Football index	Sport	
304	Sport top story	Sport	
340	Cricket index	Sport	
360	Formula 1 index	Sport	
368	Rugby Union index	Sport	
370	Rugby League index	Sport	
390	Around the UK (Sport)	Sport	Regional sports headlines
400	Weather	Weather	
401	Forecast maps index	Weather	
405	Warnings	Weather	Severe weather warnings and flood warnings
430	Travel	Travel	The BBC Travel website closed in February 2017. As such there is no direct online successor to the Red Button travel pages.
431	UK motorways	Travel	
432	Rail	Travel	
435	Ferries	Travel	
436	London Transport	Travel	
437	Regional roads	Travel	
481	Golf	Sport	
485	Tennis	Sport	
501	Entertainment news	Entertainment	
504	Entertainment top story	Entertainment	
660	Racing	Sport	
700	Election Results	News	Only active when required (e.g. following a major UK or European election)
888	Subtitles	Help	Information on how subtitling can be accessed via digital TV; unlike Ceefax, subtitles cannot be accessed directly from BBC RB
1010	UK News	News	
1020	World News	News	
1030	Health News	News	
3901	Regional sport - England	Sport	
3905	Regional sport - Scotland	Sport	
3910	Regional sport - Wales	Sport	
3915	Regional sport - Northern Ireland	Sport	
4010	UK Summary	Weather	
4100	World Cities	Weather	
4011–4017	UK Forecast Maps	Weather	
9990	Help	Help	

== Compatibility ==
The service was initially compatible with ONdigital and ITV Digital boxes, though loading speeds were slower than newer Freeview boxes.

Page numbers were introduced in 2004 to aid navigation, with 3-digit page numbers matching with those of the analogue Ceefax in 2006. Pages exclusive to digital are given a four digit number. An index navigation screen was also introduced, replacing the previous BBCi Menu.

The Teletext service from the UK commercial broadcasters had stopped supporting the old boxes in 2005. As of 2010, the ONdigital boxes only load pages 100 and 199 and some interactive services that use channel 301, if any other page is loaded it exits the service.

Usage of these boxes dwindled further as technology developed. They used "original" technology and as such were not upgradable. Following each regional changeover to full digital TV broadcasting, the remaining units are no longer of use, as they do not support the "8K-mode" for DVB-T introduced across the UK as part of the digital switchover.

On Freely, the service is available to users who have an aerial.

== See also ==
- MHEG-5 Programming Language for Freeview
- BBC Online
