= DVB-HTML =

Standard allowing digital televisions access to web content

DVB-HTML, or Digital Video Broadcast HyperText Markup Language, is a standard for allowing digital televisions to access web content. It is an optional part of the larger MHP1.1 standard of DVB.

The specification is based on a modularized version of XHTML 1.1, and also includes Cascading Style Sheets (CSS) 2.0, Document Object Model (DOM) 2.0, and ECMAScript (also known as JavaScript).

== See also ==
- Smart TV
