= DVB-RCT =

DVB-RCT (Digital Video Broadcasting - Return Channel Terrestrial) provides a method by which the DVB-T platform (and in theory also the DVB-T2 platform, but DVB-T2 probably trialled first about 5 years after last DVB-RCT field trial) can become a bi-directional, asymmetric data path using Wireless between broadcasters and customers. DVB-T when completed with DVB-RCT can be used not only for interactive TV (voting, quiz, etc.), but also for light IP telecommunication services. Without this method, various degrees of interactivity can be offered, without implying any return channel back from the user to the service provider: Data Carrousel or Electronic Programs Guides (EPG) are examples of such enhanced TV services which make use of “local interactivity”, without any return path from customer to provider. To implement interactive services having a closely coupled and real-time relationship with the TV programs (e.g. interactive advertising, tele-voting, tele-quiz), a low latency return channel technology is mandatory, and this is the goal of the DVB-RCT.

== Failure ==
By 2006, Runcom, the main developer of DVB-RCT, had abandoned it (no deployments due to mobile phone penetration) and switched the expertise to portable WiMax modems and infrastructure, later adding LTE. Many people mistakenly think DVB-RCT would have allowed viewers to browse the Internet. Partially the mistaken Internet belief was due to the "It's TV" Proposal in Ireland in 2000/2001 and RTE-NL (now 2RN) 1999 field trials assisted by Runcom.

But peak time speeds using existing TV mast infrastructures would have provided about 1.2 Kbit/s or less. It could only have been used for in program voting or purchase of broadcast advert items (TV or Teletext, or later MHP / MHEG5 broadcast), very little per downloaded content. DVB-RCC, the cable version of DVB-RCT, never succeeded in competing against Cablelabs DOCSIS. Internet by Satellite did use DVB-RCS, the satellite version of DVB-RCT, but Ka-Sat and others have been deploying satellite versions of DOCSIS since 2005.

== Motivation ==
It was projected in 2001 that revenues from TV commerce would exceed revenues from e-commerce in the home by 2008. T-commerce clearly requires a return path from the home back to the digital TV service provider. The current scenario of UHF/VHF bands shows a very congested spectrum in several countries that could be a real problem for the introduction of new services.

== Principal characteristics ==
- DVB-RCT is the response that offers a wireless interaction channel for Interactive Digital Terrestrial Television, usable in the congested UHF/VHF bands.
- DVB-RCT is a spectrum efficient, low cost, powerful and flexible Multiple Access OFDM system.
- DVB-RCT can serve large cells, up to 65 km radius, providing a typical bitrate capacity of several Kbit/s for each TV viewer, even at the edge of the coverage area. Typically, these large cells closely match the downstream coverage area of the Digital Television broadcast signal.
- DVB-RCT can handle very large peaks in traffic, as it has been specifically designed to process up to 20,000 short interactions per second in tele-polling Mode, this in each sector of each cell.
- DVB-RCT can be employed with smaller cells to constitute denser networks of up to 3.5 km radius cells, providing to the user a bitrate capacity of up to several Mbit/s for each TV viewer.
- DVB-RCT does not require access to spectrum on a primary basis; the system has been designed to use any gaps or under-utilised spectrum anywhere in Bands III, IV and V without interfering with the primary analogue and digital broadcasting services.
- DVB-RCT is able to serve portable DVB-T devices.
- DVB-RCT can be used with DVB-T systems using 6, 7 or 8 MHz channels.
- DVB-RCT does not require more than 0.5W rms power transmission from the User Terminal or Set Top Box to the base station.

== Robust and flexible solution for DVB-T and DVB-T2 ==
From a pure technical point of view, DVB-RCT is built around technologies for digital transmission and information theory; in addition to the benefits of first generation OFDM technology for broadband portable and mobile services, Multiple Access OFDM included in the DVB-RCT specification provides the following characteristics:

- Turbo Codes: gives a further reduction in the required C/N ratio of 1.5 dB. As a result, some Modulation Modes of DVB-RCT require a C/N of only 4 dB.
- Time Interleaving: gives at least an additional 5 dB improvement against the Impulsive Interference (the actual figure depends on the repetition rate of the interference). This ensures that the coverage area of the Multiple Access OFDM signals can be designed to closely match the service area of Digital Terrestrial Television broadcast, thus reducing the need for new installations.
- Band segmentation: greatly eases the problem of access to spectrum: any 1 MHz segment of spectrum can be used. This is particularly important as long as analogue terrestrial transmissions continue. DVB-RCT can use Channel 50 in the adjacent Coverage Area B at 2 MHz above the Vision Carrier, where the interfering energy is 30 dB+ down relative to the vision carrier.
- Dynamically Assignable Adaptive Modulation (DAAM): DVB-RCT supports within the same cell the simultaneous use of different types of modulation from 4QAM (1/2 rate) to 64QAM (3/4 rate). This feature enables the Service Provider to control the level of interference from a given cell into neighbouring co-channel cells while, at the same time making maximum use of the allocated spectrum.
- Power Ranging: DVB-RCT uses a power ranging system, similar to that used in Cellular phones, to ensure that the lowest power is used by the Interactive Terminals at all times. This is also consistent with the need for spectrum efficiency.
- Spectrum efficiency: highly spectrum efficient.
- Carrier spacing, burst structures: has 3 Carrier Spacings (CS) and 3 Burst (slot) Structures (BS1, BS2, BS3) which cover a wide range of deployment scenarios from non-dense, very large broadcasting type cells to very dense networks of small cell.

== Physical parameters ==
Downstream Channel (DS)	OFDM, ETS 300 744 (DVB-T) compliant
Return Interaction Channel	Multiple Access OFDM (MA-OFDM)
Forward Interaction Channel (US)	Embedded in DS, compliant with ETS 300 744 (DVB-T)
OFDM Carrier set	1024 (1K), 2048 (2K)
OFDM Carrier spacing (CS)	~1K, ~2K, ~4K
Transmission modes	6 modes (as combination of 3 CS and 2 Carrier set)
Carrier shaping	Nyquist, Rectangular
Guard Interval	1/8, 1/16, 1/32 (for Rectangular shaping only)
Transmission Frames	TF1, TF2
Data randomization	PRBS with polynomial: 1+X14+x15
Modulation	QPSK, 16QAM, 64QAM
Useful data payload per burst	18, 27, 36, 54, 81 bytes (1 burst = 144 modul. Symbols)
Channel codes	Turbo or concatenated (Reed-Solomon + Convol.)
Interleaving	Random Interleaver - PRBS with polynomial: 1+X3+x10
Burst Structures	BS1, BS2, BS3
Frequency hopping	for BS1 only (optional)
Medium Access Schemes	MAS1, MAS2, MAS3 ( as combinations of BS and TF)
Net Bit rate /carrier (range)	0.6 kbit/s - 15 kbit/s (depending on the mode)
Service range	Up to 65 km (cell radius)
Channelisation	6, 7, 8 MHz channels are supported
