= Enhanced TV =

Enhanced TV was a blanket branding for interactive second screen experiences offered by selected ABC and ESPN television programs. Programs under the banner offered live interactivity through the ABC or ESPN website—including such as trivia questions, live statistics and play prediction games during sports broadcasts, and other features. The service was first introduced on college football in 1998 with PrimeTime Player, and was also used as part of other programs, such as Monday Night Football and ESPN Sunday Night Football, the Academy Awards, and Who Wants to Be a Millionaire.
