= Freeview (Australia) =

Digital terrestrial television platform in Australia

Freeview Australia Limited
- Type: Privately held company
- Industry: Digital television
- Founded: 24 November 2008
- Headquarters: Sydney, Australia
- Area served: Australia
- Website: www.freeview.com.au

Freeview is the brand name of the digital terrestrial television platform in Australia intended to bring all free-to-air (FTA) broadcasters onto a consistent marketing platform, to compete against subscription television, in particular Foxtel. The strategy coincided with the expansion to 3 digital channels for each FTA network and the phasing out of analogue television in Australia. Important services from Freeview include its free-to-air channels with an enhanced EPG (electronic program guide) across all channels. Freeview also certifies televisions, set-top boxes and personal video recorders (PVR) which meet its standards.

The Freeview brand was launched in November 2008 with teaser commercials promising 15 channels in 2009. The first new "Freeview" channel started on 26 March 2009 with Network 10's One HD channel (now 10 Drama). Further advertising began on 26 April 2009, with the first Freeview certified devices appearing in retailers from May 2009. In June 2010, the second phase of devices, marked as "Freeview EPG" devices, became available in retail stores, designed to work with the newly launched interactive EPG built on MHEG-5. This Freeview EPG ceased operating on 24 November 2017, and Freeview is now focusing on its new Hybrid Broadcast Broadband TV (HbbTV) FreeviewPlus service which was launched in 2014 and incorporates an onscreen guide.

== History ==
Digital terrestrial television commenced in Australia on 1 January 2001, in Sydney, Melbourne, Brisbane, Adelaide and Perth using DVB-T standards. The transition from analog PAL transmissions began on 30 June 2010 and was completed by 10 December 2013.

The Freeview brand was launched on 24 November 2008, while the actual service commenced in 2009 along with the rollout of a number of Freeview badged set-top boxes and integrated digital televisions. (At least four manufacturers intend to release Phase 1 Freeview devices which do not support MHEG-5.)

Freeview has been criticised as being ambiguous and light on details, with criticism that certification is more about restricting devices than enabling them. The introduction of channels replacing the previous high definition simulcasts led to complaints that regular programming was no longer broadcast in high-definition.

== Ownership ==
The Freeview organisation comprises free-to-air licencees of Australian Broadcasting Corporation, Special Broadcasting Service, Seven Network, Nine Network and Network 10.

An ABC release stated these groups are shareholders of Freeview, though a company search revealed all shares were owned by the Nine Network.

WIN Corporation was a member of the Freeview organisation until March 2012 after complaints over the organisation's role in the television industry and the cost of operations. SBS withdrew from Freeview in May 2015, citing federal budget cuts, but Freeview cannot disable SBS's HbbTV app or remove it from the airwaves.

== Freeview certification standards ==
Part of the Freeview initiative is to certify set-top boxes as capable of receiving free-to-air digital television broadcasts (both standard and high definition). Although certification requirements have not been formally released, Phase 1 Freeview devices will be high-definition, and capable of more advanced video encoding (MPEG-4). Recorders will not be able to skip over ads, and must enforce digital rights management. Skip features were initially limited to a minimum of 10 minutes, but these restriction were eased to 3 minutes in 2015 in response to a request from a hardware manufacturer supporting FreeviewPlus.

Phase 2 required Freeview devices to feature MHEG-5 technology, which Freeview used to support its interactive electronic program guide and proposed future enhancements.

The Freeview advertising for their 17-channel platform and certified products, combined with the Australian government's commercials warning of the closure of analog TV transmissions, was intended to help consumers buy appropriate devices.

Freeview has threatened PVR manufacturers such as DViCO with legal action if they include the Freeview (UK) logo (which looks very similar to the Freeview Australia logo) on their Australian packaging.

Eurofins Digital Testing, is the Officially Approved Test Centre for Freeview Australia conformance testing, where manufacturers wishing to deploy devices with the Freeview Australia logo and EPG can obtain pass reports.

Sony Interactive Entertainment Australia added Freeview compatibility to the PlayStation 3's PlayTV digital television tuner in October 2009 with the 1.21 firmware update. The update disabled ad-skipping, reduced fast forward and rewind speed to 30x and removed the ability to copy recordings to other devices. Unlike other Freeview-endorsed devices, these restrictions can be easily bypassed on the PlayStation 3.

=== High-definition ===
To obtain Freeview certification, devices must include at least one high-definition digital tuner, supporting the HD formats of 576p, 720p and 1080i.

=== Video decoding ===
Freeview devices must be capable of receiving and decoding H.264/MPEG-4 AVC, a far less data-stream hungry standard than the initial MPEG-2 standard. The standard allows higher quality transmissions or more television channels. All broadcasters now use MPEG-4 for their primary channel HD services, as well as some additional channels (in HD and SD).

=== Digital video recorders ===
Freeview devices can not skip an ad block. Initially they could skip 10-minute blocks, and fast forward and rewind at 30x speeds, but these were changed to 3 minutes and 32x in 2015.

Hard drive-based recorders must offer a minimum of 160GB internal storage, with Digital Rights Management applied to recordings copied off the device. Restrictions must also be in place to ensure recordings can not be accessed if the hard drive is removed from the recorder.

=== Enhanced EPG (MHEG-5) – Phase 2 ===
Phase 1 Freeview devices were not required to feature Freeview MHEG-5 EPG technology, and manufacturers could sell Freeview Phase 1 devices without MHEG-5 until 2012, and were not required to label such devices as Phase 1. Freeview Phase 2 certified devices incorporate a MHEG-5 electronic programming guide (EPG).

In July 2009, Freeview signed a licensing deal for MHEG-5, the traditional information grid pattern EPG which is covered under patents owned by Macrovision.

Freeview announced details of its EPG on 28 June 2010, with plans for a consumer launch in September 2010. The new EPG was based on the same EPG data available to all digital TV devices via the broadcast signal, but also monitored Content Reference Indicator (CRID) data embedded in the broadcast signal. The CRID data allowed recorders to detect when a program is running over schedule and continue recording.

After initial confusion as to whether non-Freeview devices would still have access to the EPG, Freeview confirmed the broadcast EPG would remain. Only Freeview-endorsed PVRs featuring the "Freeview EPG" logo have access to the new Freeview EPG, although the Freeview-endorsed TiVo recorder will extract CRID data from the broadcast signal to update its own EPG (with permission from the networks), rather than relying on Freeview's EPG data.

Australian EPG provider IceTV's High Court victory over the Nine Network, secured its right to supply a third-party EPG service, which may influence Freeview's long-term plans for the broadcast and MHEG-5 EPG services. The ruling may also affect whether third-party EPG providers have the right to extract CRID data from the broadcast signal without permission from the networks, as the CRID data will not be encrypted.

On 24 November 2014, Freeview announced that its MHEG-5 EPG service will cease on 24 November 2017, without an effect on its FreeviewPlus service.

=== HbbTV support ===
In September 2014, Freeview announced FreeviewPlus, a catchup TV and enhanced EPG service built on the Hybrid Broadcast Broadband TV standard. To access the service, TV and set-top boxes need to be both HbbTV compatible and be connected to the internet.

While Freeview runs a FreeviewPlus certification program, any HbbTV compatible television equipment can display the apps. Initially only televisions received official FreeviewPlus certification. The first certified set-top box was released in May 2015 and the first digital video recorder – the Dish TV AerialBox T2200 – was released in August 2015.

=== Non-compliant devices ===
Existing digital television devices should continue to operate without Freeview certification, with the following caveats:

- Only HD devices can view the HD channels
- When the TV networks start transmitting in MPEG-4, non-MPEG-4 capable boxes will not be able to receive those channels.

=== Government labelling scheme ===
As well as Freeview labelling, the Australian Government has its own scheme for identifying digital ready televisions and set top boxes. Freeview branded set top boxes are labelled as 'High Definition Ready' under the government scheme, however non-Freeview boxes can also be labelled in the same way, leading to viewer confusion as to whether the Freeview channels will be receivable on those set top boxes without the branding.

== Channels ==
A Freeview compliant device will display all digital television channels broadcast in a viewer's market area, including those broadcast in high definition. While Freeview promotes its approved devices, its website notes that any HD compatible device will show the same channels.

With the exception of WIN Television services and in some regional areas, most digital channels broadcast the Freeview EPG. While WIN Television stations no longer broadcast the Freeview EPG, their programming is still listed in the EPG and channels remain on the Freeview website.

== Online services ==
Through Freeview, the free-to-air broadcasters have signed a new initiative for an industry-wide video hub – details of what content will be carried is unknown. A consultant has been commissioned to advise on vendor partnerships, and ABC's iView technology is the frontrunner to deliver the service. Plans for this video hub have been superseded by the FreeviewPlus service.

The ABC, SBS, Seven Network, Nine Network and Network Ten each offer "catch up" internet television services in Australia, allowing viewers to watch local and foreign content after it has been shown on their respective channels, while One allows online streaming of select sporting content, including live streams of Formula One.

=== FreeviewPlus ===
In September 2014, Freeview launched FreeviewPlus, its Hybrid Broadcast Broadband TV (HbbTV) service, which consists of six HbbTV apps – one for each of the five major Australian free-to-air broadcasters and a sixth cross-network electronic programming guide (EPG). Each network offers access to its catch-up TV library via its apps, plus it is possible to scroll back in time through the green button on-screen guide to view catch up programs. The service won Best Enhanced TV Service at the International Interactive TV Awards 2015.

FreeviewPlus is not always available when viewing channels through regional affiliates. The Freeview website lists which catch up services and EPG listings are available by postcode. Where a user cannot access the catch up service through FreeviewPlus, it may still be accessible via a third party device running the broadcaster's app.

In May 2017, Freeview announced a brand overhaul of FreeviewPlus to align it more closely with its newer Freeview FV brand. The changes would include a new logo, and a simplified user interface.

=== Freeview FV ===
In November 2016, Freeview released an app for iOS and Android devices that provides access to live-streaming of Freeview channels. While also marketed as providing access to catch-up services from within the app, the app instead redirects users to the relevant catch-up apps. As at 2 December 2018, the application is still not available for "Android TV" streaming platform. Neither is "SBS on Demand", and "ABC iview".

=== DVB-I ===
In December 2025, Freeview Australia announced plans to commence testing of DVB-I technology during 2026. DVB-I is an open standard developed by the DVB Project that enables television services to be discovered and accessed over broadband internet connections while retaining traditional channel numbering and electronic programme guide functionality. The trial will involve the free-to-air services of the ABC, SBS, Seven Network, Nine Network and Network 10, allowing channels to be accessed through a unified Freeview interface on connected television receivers. Testing is being conducted at the Freeview Test Centre in Sydney with support from TCL, Hisense and Philips smart televisions and technology partner Switch Media.

== Criticisms ==
Freeview has been criticised as being ambiguous and light on details, with criticism that certification is more about restricting devices than enabling them. Network Ten's simulcast of "One" in HD & SD was criticised by some as being a single channel, as it is not unique content and the introduction of One means Network Ten's non-sports programming is no longer broadcast in HD. Freeview certification will include at least two phases, with the Phase 1 Freeview devices not required to feature the MHEG-5 technology Freeview intends to use to support its Electronic Program Guide.

In addition to the lack of detail, minimal information was given by Seven and Nine Network management regarding new channel launch dates. The original Freeview announcement stated planned May releases for the launch of new digital channels by both networks, while a later Seven release mentioned mid-2009 and then October for its secondary channel launch.
