= MHEG-5 =

Set of international standards

MHEG-5, or ISO/IEC 13522–5, is part of a set of international standards relating to the presentation of multimedia information, standardised by the Multimedia and Hypermedia Experts Group (MHEG). It is most commonly used as a language to describe interactive television services.

== Characteristics ==
MHEG-5 is a licence-free and public standard for interactive TV middleware that is used both to send and receive interactive TV signals. It allows a wide range of TV-centric interactive services to be deployed. It is used by Freeview and Freesat in the UK, Freeview in New Zealand, TVB in Hong Kong, Freeview in Australia, Saorview in Ireland and has been specified in South Africa.

Recent work by the DTG in the UK has led to the development of the MHEG-5 Interaction Channel (MHEG-IC), which enables an extension of broadcast interactive services to be delivered via an IP connection. The principles behind the MHEG-IC are to provide a seamless viewer experience of broadcast delivered content augmented with content delivered over IP as an extension of the channel or network. Broadcasters have full editorial control of the user experience. The MHEG-IC gives access to streamed on-demand video content in addition to traditional text and graphics as well as the ability to support secure transactions.

MHEG-5 is an object-based declarative programming language which can be used to describe a presentation of text, images and video. An MHEG-5 application consists of a number of Scenes which the user of the application can move between. Each Scene lists the items of text and graphics to be presented and can contain blocks of procedural code which are executed in response to one of a predefined set of events such as keys being pressed, timers firing or content being successfully loaded into memory. These blocks of code consist of elementary actions which can perform operations such as changing the text displayed by a text object, or starting a video clip playing.

MHEG-5 specifies a hierarchy of classes that are available to the application author. Unlike in object oriented languages, it is not possible for new classes to be defined. The standard defines two representations of MHEG applications, one of which is textual and the other is represented in ASN.1. Applications are normally written in the textual notation and then encoded into ASN.1 for interpretation by the MHEG engine.

MHEG-5 is suited to programming interactive kiosks and interactive television services.

== Use in other standards ==
MHEG-5 has been selected as the mandatory interactivity engine for CI+ compliant TVs (and other CI+ devices).

== Profiles and commercial roll-out ==
The MHEG-5 language itself is just that, a language. To be useful in any particular context, the language needs to be profiled. A broadcast profile of the language has been standardized by ETSI, forming ETSI standard ES 202 184.

=== United Kingdom ===
In the United Kingdom, MHEG-5 is used to provide interactive services for digital television such as the BBCs Ceefax replacement service, BBC Red Button. The full specification of how MHEG-5 is used in the context of the UK Freeview platform is the UK Profile of MHEG-5. MHEG is also used on Freesat for its programming guide in addition to the DVB EIT, as opposed to the OpenTV platform used on Sky.

=== New Zealand and Australia ===
In New Zealand, the same profile as in UK is used, with minor additions for the Maori language and its use of the guide key on certified Freeview receivers. The guide receiver key is used to activate the MHEG-5 programming guide; this however disables use of the more compatible and faster loading DVB EIT guide feature. In Australia, this guide practice was adopted for the phase 2 Freeview and VAST receivers referenced by the label Freeview EPG.

=== Hong Kong ===
In Hong Kong, TVB has also selected MHEG-5 for interactive services available on its digital-only channels.

=== Ireland ===
Ireland has selected MHEG-5 (v1.06) middleware for interactive services as a recommended feature of its Minimum Receiver Requirements for DTT in Ireland. The name for Ireland's free digital service is Saorview.

== Class hierarchy ==
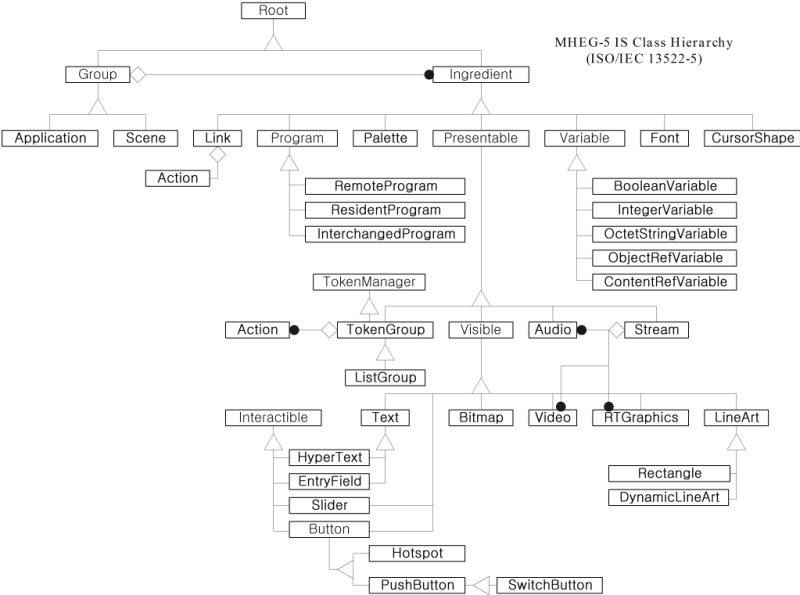
Note: You can download the PDF version of above image from http://mheg5.net/down/class.pdf.

== See also ==
- Hybrid Broadcast Broadband TV (HbbTV), an alternative technology used for interactive television services via broadcasting and broadband communication media in some European countries.
- MediaHighway, a proprietary middleware for interactive television owned by NDS.
- Multimedia Home Platform (MHP), an alternative technology used for interactive television services in some European countries.
