= Viera Cast =

Smart TV platform by Panasonic

Viera Cast is a Smart TV platform by Panasonic that makes it possible to stream multimedia content from the Internet directly into select Viera HDTVs and Blu-ray players. It was announced during the January 2008 exhibition of the Consumer Electronics Show (CES) in Las Vegas and began rolling out in Panasonic Viera TVs several months later.

== Development ==
Panasonic initially partnered with Google to make it possible for YouTube videos and Picasa Web Album photos to be used within the product, while Bloomberg News and The Weather Channel were also available. Beginning in 2009, Amazon Video on Demand service was added. The first Viera HDTVs with Viera Cast, the TH-PZ850U series, appeared in May 2008. Panasonic introduced Netflix video streaming service and Skype to its Viera Cast line-up beginning with the 2010 model year. Panasonic TV's with Viera Cast from the 2008 or 2009 model years are not able to access Netflix or Skype. Mid-2010 a Twitter service was added.

The Viera HDTVs and Blu-ray players have a built-in Ethernet interface; many models also have Wi-Fi connectivity and thus no external box or PC is required. The service is accessed via a single button on the HDTV remote. Viera announced that it would extend the feature to three series of the company's 2009 Viera G, V and Z series of HDTVs. Panasonic also released three stand-alone players and a portable Blu-ray player that support the technology.

== Availability ==
Availability of services differs per region/country/language. For example: In the Netherlands, it is mostly English content/services, but also some German (Bild.de, Tageschau). In Poland, users of the Viera Cast-enabled devices can access around 1,500 movies for free after Panasonic partnered with Polish Internet portal Iplex.pl as part of the company's bid to increase the uptake of interconnected television in the country. In Australia, 7plus is available on most models and Bloomberg's stock market service was discontinued starting August 2011.

== Successor ==
The Viera Cast service was replaced by a new platform called Viera Connect which is not backward compatible. However, if the television supported Viera Cast, it could be upgraded to the new smart TV as long as it is at least a 2010 model. The service had an improved number of applications on offer as the platform is open to third-party developers. Features also include a remote app for easier text input and navigation using a smartphone or a tablet as well as a Viera Connect Market app store where users can download games and online services.

In 2012, Panasonic added the UK BBC iPlayer service to the Viera Connect. This content is part of the larger upgrade to the platform, which - according to the company - allowed a more robust and interactive connected TV experience.

== See also ==
- Smart TV
- Interactive television
