= Open IPTV Forum =

Non-profit consortium and standards

- Abbreviation: OIPF
- Formation: 19 March 2007; 19 years ago
- Type: INGO
- Website: www.oipf.tv (Now Defunct)

The Open IPTV Forum (OIPF) was a non-profit consortium and standards organization focused on defining and publishing open for end-to-end Internet Protocol television (IPTV) standards. It was later joined by several others.

Since June 2014, OIPF has been part of the Hybrid Broadcast Broadband TV association, a similar industry organisation for hybrid broadcast and broadband TV services formed in 2009, which worked closely with OIPF on browser and media specifications for network-connected televisions and set-top boxes.

== History ==
In March 2007 AT&T, Ericsson, Orange, Panasonic, Philips, Samsung, Siemens, Sony and Telecom Italia formed the group.

In September 2010 the consortium released the second version of their specification.

The HbbTV standard, which has been adopted by many broadcasters across Europe, is based on the specifications created by the Open IPTV Forum.

The OIPF and HbbTV announced a joint initiative for testing and certification in 2012.

In June 2014, OIPF merged with HbbTV. The two initiatives were combined under the HbbTV banner because the markets for IPTV, OTT and hybrid broadcast and broadband TV are converging.
