= Hybrid Broadcast Broadband TV =

Industry standard for hybrid digital television

The HbbTV logo

Hybrid Broadcast Broadband TV (HbbTV) is both an industry standard (European Telecommunications Standards Institute (ETSI) TS 102 796) and a promotional initiative for hybrid digital television to harmonise the broadcast, Internet Protocol Television (IPTV), and broadband delivery of entertainment to the end consumer through connected TVs (smart TVs) and set-top boxes. The HbbTV Association, comprising digital broadcasting and Internet industry companies, has established a standard for the delivery of broadcast TV and broadband TV to the home, through a single user interface, creating an open platform as an alternative to proprietary technologies. Products and services using the HbbTV standard can operate over different broadcasting technologies, such as satellite, cable, or terrestrial networks.

HbbTV can show digital television content from a number of different sources including traditional broadcast TV, Internet, and connected devices in the home. To watch hybrid digital TV, consumers will need a hybrid IPTV set-top box or Smart TV with a range of input connectors, including Ethernet as well as at least one tuner for receiving broadcast TV signals. The tuner can be digital terrestrial television (DVB-T, DVB-T2), digital cable (DVB-C, DVB-C2) or digital satellite (DVB-S, DVB-S2).

== History ==
The HbbTV Consortium (later HbbTV Association) was born in February 2009 from the French H4TV project and the German HTML profil project. HbbTV was first demonstrated in 2009, in France by France Télévisions and two developers of set-top box technologies, Inverto Digital Labs of Luxembourg, and Pleyo of France, for the Roland Garros tennis sport event on a DTT transmission and an IP connection and in Germany using the Astra satellite at 19.2° east during the IFA and IBC exhibitions.

In May 2011, in an email sent on behalf of the HbbTV Consortium steering group, supporters of the consortium were invited to become full members. The transitional arrangements towards the opening of membership would involve withdrawal of a number of privileges, including participation in meetings and contribution to further versions of the specification, from supporters that did not sign up. The cost of membership was around €7,000 for the first year.

In June 2014, the HbbTV Association merged with the Open IPTV Forum, a similar industry organisation for end-to-end Internet Protocol television (IPTV) services formed in 2007, which worked closely with the HbbTV initiative on browser and media specifications for network-connected televisions and set-top boxes. The two initiatives were combined under the HbbTV Association's banner because the markets for IPTV, OTT and hybrid broadcast and broadband TV are converging.

In September 2016 it was announced that the Smart TV Alliance, founded in 2012 by LG Electronics, Panasonic, Toshiba and TP Vision, was to merge with HbbTV, extending the scope of the HbbTV specification to address over-the-top services and to streamline standards. The merger was expected to be finalised within a year.

== Applications and consumer products ==
Services delivered through HbbTV include enhanced teletext, catch-up services through video on demand, EPG, interactive advertising, personalisation, voting, games, social networking, and other multimedia applications.

At the May 2010 Broadcast and Beyond Conference in London, Thomas Wrede, VP Product Management Media at SES, said that he expected HbbTV devices to be launched commercially from June 2010 with a consumer market introduction at the IFA consumer electronics trade fair in Berlin in September 2010. Wrede also noted that Humax and Videoweb both had conformant products and that at the then-recent ANGA Cable trade fair in Cologne, 12 manufacturers exhibited HbbTV devices, with another six working on product introduction.

In March 2019 Panasonic launched the first commercial deployment of the HbbTV "OpApp" operator App enabling Panasonic 2019 smart TVs to receive services from the high-definition satellite television platform for German-speaking users, HD+ without the set-top box, CI module or smartcard previously required. With the app, the TV is only required to be connected to a satellite dish pointing at Astra 19.2°E and to the internet. The OpApp also offers HD+ viewers an 'instant restart' function, direct access to catch-up TV services and an interactive, customisable programme guide. Two weeks after Panasonic's introduction of the app, Samsung also offered the app's integrated access to HD+ on its 2019 TVs. The OpApp acts like a virtual set-top box inside the smart TV so platform operators can provide a branded, uniform interface across different manufacturers.

== Benefits ==
HbbTV devices enable consumers to view all of these advanced services on their TV, via a single device. In addition to a broader range of content from TV providers – ranging from traditional broadcast TV, video on-demand and catch-up TV services, like BBC iPlayer – hybrid digital TV also provides consumers with access to user-generated content either stored on an external hard drive, or cloud storage, and to a range of advanced interactive services and Internet applications.

Hybrid set-top boxes are increasingly commonplace amongst pay-TV operators, as they look to meet the changing media consumption trends for more video content, advanced interactivity and internet applications, like social networking. Operators like n, a division of ITI Neovision in Poland, and Telekom Austria are two of the leaders in the deployment of hybrid set-top boxes. The 2010 IPTV World Forum Awards recognized a hybrid solution as the best interactive TV service/application: the solution, developed by Advanced Digital Broadcast, was the first three-way hybrid platform that enables content delivered via satellite, terrestrial and Ethernet networks to be viewed on a television.

== Association membership ==
The HbbTV consortium has over 75 supporting members from the CE and broadcast industries, including:

- Standardisation and research bodies: ATET, Digital TV Group, Dolby, EBU, Everyone TV, Fraunhofer FOKUS
- Broadcasting and streaming: Amazon, BBC, Cellnex, CommScope, Deutsche Telekom, Digita, Discovery, ERT, Eutelsat, Freesat, Freeview (Australia), Freewheel, Google, ITV, Seven.One, RAI, RBB, Red Bull Media House, Reti Televisive Italiane, RTL Group, Salto, SES, Sky UK, SRG SSR, TDF, TV3, Tivù Sat
- Software and Content protection: Access, BearingPoint, Fincons Group, Irdeto, iWedia, Kineton, Netgem, Ocean Blue Software, Samba TV, Seraphic, SmarDTV, Sofia Digital, Suresoft, Synamedia, Verance, Vewd, Viaccess, Zeasn
- CE devices and components manufacturers: Amlogic, Arçelik, Changhong, CVTE, Hisense, HiSilicon, LG, MediaTek, Novatek, Panasonic, Realtek, Roku, Sagemcom, Samsung, Sharp, Skyworth, Smit, Sony, TCL, Tele System, TD Systems, TP Vision, Vestel, Xperi
- Test Houses for CE devices: Resillion

The HbbTV Association steering group currently comprises representatives from: BBC, Cellnex Telecom, Deutsche Telekom, EBU, Resillion, LG, Panasonic, RAI, Reti Televisive Italiane, RTL Group, Salto, Samsung, Sony, Tivù Sat, TP Vision and Vewd.

== Standard ==
As well as helping consumers/viewers, the introduction of the HbbTV standard is of benefit to both equipment manufacturers and content providers who at the moment have to produce hardware or content specific to each country to meet the de facto standard in that country. The establishment of a unified European HbbTV standard means "content owners and application developers can write once and deploy to many countries".

The HbbTV specification was developed by industry members of the consortium and is based on elements of existing standards and web technologies including the Open IPTV Forum, CEA, DVB, and W3C.

The European Broadcasting Union General Assembly has given its support to the HbbTV initiative and described the technology as "one of the most exciting developments in the media today".

The standard specification was submitted by the end of November 2009 to ETSI, who published it under reference ETSI TS 102 796 in June 2010. There is an accompanying Test Suite that provides a set of test material to test HbbTV device implementations, suitable for manufacturers of devices, including software and hardware components that implement the HbbTV specification (ETSI TS 102 796 v1.1.1). In November 2012 Eurofins Digital Testing (then Digital TV Labs) became the first Registered Test Centre.

The applications for HbbTV are HTML-based, making use of HTML5 and the CE-HTML user interface language, but utilise only a sub-set of standard web standards, developers have to use specialist validation tools.

In September 2017 the HbbTV Association announced the publication of its IPTV specification by ETSI as TS 103 555. This specification builds on HbbTV 2.0 and defines how audio-visual content delivered by an IPTV service can be presented on HbbTV terminals (such as set-top boxes and televisions): both hybrid terminals with an IP connection and an RF-based broadcast connection, and pure IPTV terminals with only an IP connection.

The next incremental version of the standard (HbbTV 2.0.1) included functionality from the MHEG-5 interactive middleware platform used for digital terrestrial TV in the UK, to facilitate the transition from MHEG-5 to HbbTV as the mandated system in the UK. HbbTV 2.0.2 enables support for HDR and HFR video and next generation (AC-4 and MPEG-H) audio.

Editions of HbbTV specifications
HbbTV edition	ETSI TS 102 796 edition	Date
1.0	v1.1.1	Jun 2006
1.5	v1.2.1	Nov 2012
2.0	v1.3.1	Nov 2015
2.0.1	V1.4.1	Apr 2016
2.0.2	V1.5.1	Sep 2018
2.0.3	V1.6.1	Oct 2020
2.0.4	V1.7.1	Sep 2023

== Rollout ==
Several countries, particularly in Europe, have adopted the HbbTV standard and/or operated HbbTV services and trials. As of December 2011, HbbTV services were in regular operation in France, Germany and Spain, with announcements of adoption in Austria, Czech Republic, Slovakia, Denmark, Netherlands, Poland, Switzerland, Turkey, and trials in Australia, China, Japan, and the United States.

As of October 2015, 27 countries have launched HbbTV services with the most recent being the UK, New Zealand, Senegal, Namibia, Bosnia and Estonia. In October 2014, the HbbTV Association announced that over 20 countries had launched HbbTV services with Italy and Saudi being the most recent to launch.

=== Europe ===
==== Estonia ====
In Estonia HbbTV was adopted on March 10, 2015.

==== Finland ====
In Finland the national HDTV Forum has adopted the NorDig Unified Specification for Hybrid Services. The members of HDTV Forum see the HbbTV specification having a wide market acceptance supporting wide range of TV applications and new hybrid services. HbbTV services have been on air in Finland since March 2013 in the nationwide terrestrial TV network. Current services include "red button" services and an enhanced programme guide application. Several broadcasters in Finland use the HbbTV platform. Those are Yle Nelonen Media and MTV.

==== France ====
In France, the government-owned public broadcaster, France Télévisions selected HbbTV for its interactive news, sports and weather service, and plans to add catch-up TV and social media sharing capability. International French news channel France 24 announced that it would launch an HbbTV interactive news service in 2012 via the Astra 19.2°E satellites, with support from Orange and SES.

==== Germany ====
In 2010 German broadcaster RTL Television introduced a new information service, HD Text, making use of HbbTV and the CE-HTML user interface language, and in 2012 launched an online music video service (Clipfish Music) on its HbbTV portal allowing access to TV viewers.

In February 2020, German public broadcaster ARD launched Replay TV, offering viewers the option of restarting a running programme, via HbbTV. The function is available on all smart TVs and set-top boxes with the HbbTV 2.0.1 standard.

==== Greece ====
In Greece HbbTV was adopted in November 2016 by ERT.

==== Italy ====
Italy had launched HbbTV services by October 2014.

==== Lithuania ====
In June 2019, the Lithuanian Radio and Television Centre launched a Lithuania nationwide HbbTV broadcasting service. The service provides access to some of regional broadcasters and their media library archive. Service also includes radio stations support.

==== Montenegro ====
In August 2019, Montenegrin service provider M:TEL created HbbTV portal for RTCG state TV and MTEL HbbTV portal for all other channels distributed within its cable DVB-C network.

==== Netherlands ====
In 2011 the Dutch national public networks, NPO 1, 2, and 3 began broadcasting HbbTV "red button" applications including a program guide and catch-up TV instead of developing separate apps for particular platforms.

==== Nordic regions and Ireland ====
In Nordic region (Denmark, Finland, Iceland, Norway, Sweden, and Ireland) the NorDig standardization forum has adopted the HbbTV specification which replaces DVB-MHP as the common API for hybrid digital receivers.

==== Poland ====
The first tests of HbbTV services in Poland were started by TVN in March 2012.

==== Spain ====
In November 2011 Spain's Ministry of Industry approved a document signed by 54 companies adopting the HbbTV standard and broadcasters, Mediaset España, Canal+ and Telefónica have run pilot services.

In November 2018, LOVEStv (in test emission since June 2018) was launched in Spain. It is a joint venture of RTVE, Atresmedia and Mediaset España, offering catch-up services based on an HbbTV standard.

==== Switzerland ====
In Switzerland the first HbbTV service, called RTS+, was launched on March 5, 2013, on SRG SSR French-speaking channels RTSun HD and RTSdeux HD. The service was developed by SwissTXT.

==== Turkey ====
Turkish Radio and Television Corporation launched its HbbTV app, TRT Plus (Turkish: TRT Artı), in 2014.

In Turkey, FOX TV and Kanal7 launched its HbbTV EPG app (Fox'da ne var?, Kanal7 yayın akisi) in 2016 and 2017 provided by Turkish HBBTV company Admongrel. Service was deployed with help of Castoola HbbTV platform.

In 2017 first interactive preroll advertisement campaign (Bosch advertisement) was launched by Admongrel, Adform and Kanal7.

==== United Kingdom ====
In the UK, the Freeview Play platform has been launched implementing an HbbTV 2.0 catch-up service on DVB-T/T2. Freesat, the free-to-air satellite TV service broadcast via Astra 28.2°E, has revealed that the second generation "G2" specification for Freesat receivers will use HbbTV, to take advantage of the digital TV chipsets being developed for that standard (but retaining MHEG-5 compatibility of the first generation Freesat receivers). While the Digital TV Group approved D-book 7, a detailed interoperability specification between digital terrestrial television and HbbTV-based products and services.

In December 2017, the BBC launched a UK nationwide HbbTV broadcast service. This provides users the opportunity to launch connected TV applications from broadcast as well as offering broadcast TV applications for radio stations.

=== Australia and New Zealand ===
Freeview New Zealand launched its HbbTV platform in New Zealand in July 2015, under the registered trade mark name "FreeviewPlus", with their DVB-T service (Freeview|HD); followed by an extension to the DVB-S service (Freeview Satellite) in April 2016.

=== Western Asia and Middle East ===
Saudi Arabia had launched HbbTV services by October 2014. In early 2015, several broadcasters in Turkey reportedly began using the HbbTV platform and services provided by Admongrel.

=== Other locations ===
HbbTV is being reviewed and tested, with interest from US, Argentina, Japan, China (which is conducting a trial), Malaysian Broadcasters (where DVB-T2 broadcasting will soon start) and Singapore (where Mediacorp is introducing its service through Toggle), and also in Russia.

== HbbTV set-top boxes ==
Since the beginning of 2010 a new generation of advanced HbbTV IPTV set-top box has emerged in the UK with the advent of DVB-T2 services. DVB-T2 tuners enable the reception of free-to-air terrestrial high-definition programmes to be received in around twelve areas of the UK.

HD terrestrial services have encouraged a range of device manufacturers to launch new hybrid set-top boxes for the UK consumer retail market. Some of these companies have launched devices that, in addition to allowing traditional broadcast and IP-delivered services to be received, have an integrated smart-card slot that allows consumers to receive encrypted premium television services including sports and movies.

Such boxes enable the aggregation of traditional linear TV broadcasts with video delivered via both managed (cable) and unmanaged IP networks (the internet). This allows viewers to view broadcast television and internet video on their flat screen TVs, alongside advanced interactive services, such as video on demand, internet browsing, and time-shifted TV.

A hybrid IPTV platform helps operators increase average revenue per user (ARPU), whilst eliminating expensive duplication in network infrastructure investment. IPTV customer-premises equipment (CPE) allows pay TV operators to deploy home entertainment, with video telephony, surveillance, gaming, shopping, e-government, and interactive services amongst the service mix that can be offered.

== Tools ==
- OpenHbb is a collaborative project funded by the French government (DGCIS), the Pays de la Loire and Île-de-France regions, and the Conseil Général des Hauts-de-Seine (council for the department of Hauts-de-Seine) as part of the Images & Réseaux and Cap Digital competitiveness clusters.
- Opera has developed an HbbTV Emulator, available for free on their website. This emulator is currently in beta version.
- HbbTV App Validator is a free, cloud-based tool for HbbTV app conformance validation provided by Eurofins Digital Testing (formerly Digital TV Labs). App Validator uses static analysis to check for simple problems and use of non-standard language features in your HbbTV app's XHTML, JavaScript and CSS.
- There is also a Firefox add-on, FireHbbTV, as a free HbbTV emulator.
- OpenCaster is a free GPL licensed software for transport stream broadcasting supporting HbbTV data.

== Security and privacy concerns ==
"About 90% of Smart TVs Vulnerable to Remote Hacking via Rogue TV Signals". Rafael Scheel developed a radio frequency-based remote exploit using HbbTV that provides root access. He provided counter measures in a 2017 presentation to the European Broadcasting Union Media Cybersecurity Seminar.

Academic research by Columbia University revealed possible security flaws in HbbTV. According to the blog of Martin Herfurt (referenced in the Columbia paper), the HbbTV standard allows an attacker to inject malware into an HbbTV-enabled smart television that can cause it to do various things like modifying the content being displayed, mining Bitcoins, or attacking other devices connected to the network that the television is connected to.

The HbbTV Association has responded to the reports with a statement "HbbTV welcomes and appreciates the academic research on security threats in set-top boxes and TVs based on our specifications. The HbbTV Association continuously reviews such situations and has determined that there is limited potential for a security breach based on this research. Nevertheless, as ever, our upcoming HbbTV specification will include further appropriate security solutions."

In 2013 researchers from TU Darmstadt found widespread non-consensual use of web analytics technologies, such as third-party cookies, in HbbTV content to track viewing patterns.

== See also ==
- Inview Technology
- Globally Executable MHP
- Interactive television standards
- YouView, formerly known as Project Canvas
