= Interactive television =

Form of broadcast media

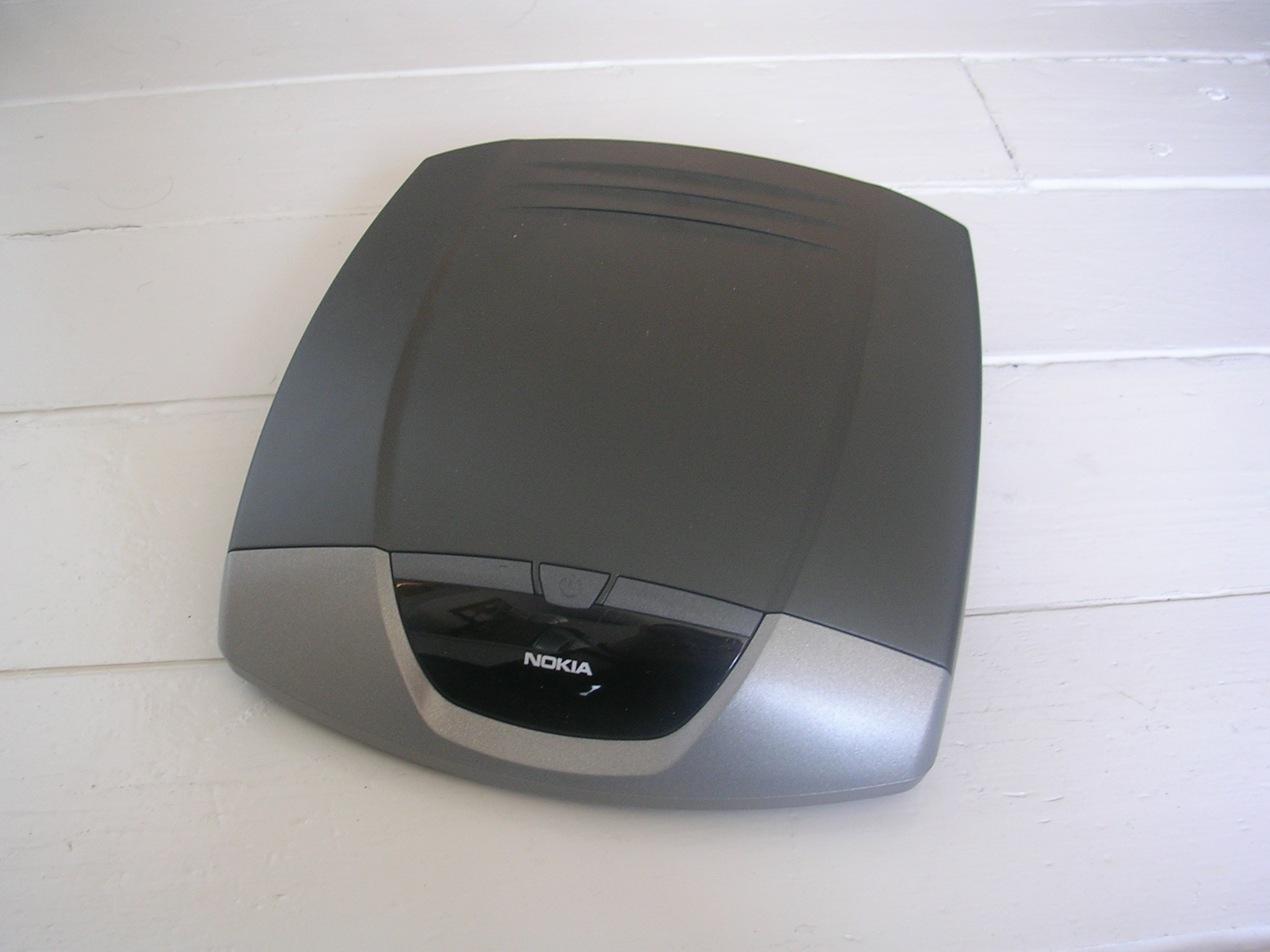
Digital TV set-top box

Interactive television is a form of media convergence, adding data services to traditional television technology. It has included on-demand delivery of content, online shopping, and viewer polls. Interactive TV is an example of how new information technology can be integrated vertically into established technologies and commercial structures.

== History ==
Prior to the development of interactive television, interaction could only be simulated. In the 1950s, there were limited efforts to provide an illusion of interactive experience, most overtly with Winky Dink and You, which encouraged viewers to draw on a vinyl sheet they would attach to a television set. QUBE operated an interactive cable television service in Ohio from 1977 to 1984.

An interactive video-on-demand (VOD) television service was proposed in 1986 in Japan, where there were plans to develop an "Integrated Network System" service. It was intended to include various interactive services, including videotelephony, home shopping, online banking, remote work, and home entertainment services. However, it was not possible to practically implement such an interactive VOD service until the adoption of DCT and ADSL technologies made it possible in the 1990s. In early 1994, British Telecommunications (BT) began testing an interactive VOD television trial service in the United Kingdom. It used the DCT-based MPEG-1 and MPEG-2 video compression standards, along with ADSL technology.

Sega Channel, a service that allowed Sega Genesis owners to download video games on demand via cable television signals, began rolling out in the United States in 1994 and was discontinued in 1998. It has been described as a form of interactive television.

The first patent of interactive connected TV was granted in 1999 in the United States; it expired in 2015.

ATSC 3.0, also known as "NextGen TV", adds interactivity features to terrestrial television. As of April 2022, broadcasters in 60 media markets in the United States were using ATSC 3.0.

== Forms of interaction ==
Interactive TV includes programs that directly incorporate polls, questions, comments, and other forms of audience response back into the show. For example, Australian media producer Yahoo!7's Fango mobile app allows viewers to provide material that producers can insert into live programming. During the 2012 Australian Open, viewers used the app to suggest questions for commentator Jim Courier to ask players in post-match interviews.

"One-screen" formats involve interaction on the TV screen, using the remote control. Remote-control user interfaces are known in human-computer interaction research as "lean back" interaction, and as a 10-foot user interface. Second screen interactive TV, also called Enhanced TV by ABC and ESPN, uses a personal computer or mobile application. Chat Television, developed in 1996, was the first example of a second screen interactive TV format. The system synchronized online services with television broadcasts, grouping users by time zone and program, so that all real-time viewers could participate in a chat or interactive gathering during the show's airing.

Interactive TV features in smart TVs have drawn criticism because they allow TV manufacturers to collect and transmit data about customer behavior for the purposes of targeted advertising.

== See also ==
- BBC Red Button
- CE-HTML
- Datacasting
- DVB-H
- Hybrid Broadcast Broadband TV
- Integrated digital television
- IP over DVB
- MHEG-5 (Multimedia Hypermedia Experts Group - Part 5)
- Multimedia Home Platform (MHP)
- Personalised television
- Project Canvas
- Social television
- Sonifi Solutions (formerly LodgeNet)
- Teletext
- WTVML
