= ISDB =

Japanese standard for digital television and radio

Integrated Services Digital Broadcasting (ISDB; Japanese: 統合デジタル放送サービス, Tōgō dejitaru hōsō sābisu) is a Japanese broadcasting standard for digital television (DTV) and digital radio.

ISDB supersedes both the NTSC-J analog television system and the previously used MUSE Hi-vision analog HDTV system in Japan. An improved version of ISDB-T (ISDB-T International) replaced the NTSC, PAL-M, and PAL-N broadcast standards in South America and the Philippines. Digital Terrestrial Television Broadcasting (DTTB) services using ISDB-T started in Japan in December 2003, and since then, many countries have adopted ISDB over other digital broadcasting standards.

A newer and "advanced" version of the ISDB standard (that will eventually allow up to 8K terrestrial broadcasts and 1080p mobile broadcasts via the VVC codec, including HDR and HFR) is currently under development.

== Countries and territories using ISDB-T ==
The following countries use the ISDB-T broadcast standard: neighbouring countries may also pick up ISDB-T signals due to signal overspill.

=== Asia ===
- Japan
- Philippines (officially adopted ISDB-T, started broadcasting in digital)
- Maldives (officially adopted ISDB-T, started broadcasting in digital)
- Sri Lanka (officially adopted ISDB-T, started broadcasting in digital)

=== Americas ===
- Brazil (officially adopted ISDB-T, started broadcasting in digital)
- Argentina (officially adopted ISDB-T, started broadcasting in digital)
- Uruguay (officially adopted ISDB-T, started broadcasting in digital)
- Peru (officially adopted ISDB-T, started broadcasting in digital)
- Chile (officially adopted ISDB-T, started broadcasting in digital)
- Venezuela (officially adopted ISDB-T, started broadcasting in digital)
- Ecuador (officially adopted ISDB-T, started broadcasting in digital)
- Costa Rica (officially adopted ISDB-T, started broadcasting in digital)
- Paraguay (officially adopted ISDB-T, started broadcasting in digital)
- Bolivia (officially adopted ISDB-T, started broadcasting in digital)
- Nicaragua (officially adopted ISDB-T, started to broadcasting in digital)
- Guatemala (officially adopted ISDB-T, briefly experimented with ATSC in 1996, started broadcasting in digital)
- Honduras (officially adopted ISDB-T, briefly experimented with ATSC in 1996, started broadcasting in digital)
- El Salvador (officially adopted ISDB-T, started broadcasting in digital)
- Belize (officially adopted ISDB-T, started broadcasting in digital)
- Saint Kitts and Nevis (officially adopted ISDB-T, started broadcasting in digital)

=== Africa ===
- Botswana (officially adopted ISDB-T, started broadcasting in digital)
- Angola (In 2013, decided on European digital terrestrial TV. However, Angola reviewed the adoption to ISDB-T system and officially launched in March 2019.)

== Introduction ==
DTT broadcasting systems. Countries using ISDB are shown in green.

ISDB is maintained by the Japanese organization ARIB. The standards can be obtained for free at the Japanese organization DiBEG website and at ARIB.

The core standards of ISDB are ISDB-S (satellite television), ISDB-T (terrestrial), ISDB-C (cable) and 2.6 GHz band mobile broadcasting which are all based on MPEG-2, MPEG-4, or HEVC standard for multiplexing with transport stream structure and video and audio coding (MPEG-2, H.264, or HEVC) and are capable of UHD, high-definition television (HDTV) and standard-definition television. ISDB-T and ISDB-Tsb are for mobile reception in TV bands. 1seg is the name of an ISDB-T component that allows viewers to watch TV channels via cell phones, laptop computers, and vehicles.

The concept was named for its similarity to ISDN as both allow multiple channels of data to be transmitted together (a process called multiplexing). This broadcast standard is also much like another digital radio system, Eureka 147, which calls each group of stations on a transmitter an ensemble; this is very much like the multi-channel digital TV standard DVB-T. ISDB-T operates on unused TV channels, an approach that was taken by other countries for TV but never before for radio.

=== Transmission ===
The various flavors of ISDB differ mainly in the modulations used, due to the requirements of different frequency bands. The 12 GHz band ISDB-S uses PSK modulation, 2.6 GHz band digital sound broadcasting uses CDM, and ISDB-T (in VHF and/or UHF band) uses COFDM with PSK/QAM.

=== Interaction ===
Besides audio and video transmission, ISDB also defines data connections (Data broadcasting) with the internet as a return channel over several media (10/100 Ethernet, telephone line modem, mobile phone, wireless LAN (IEEE 802.11), etc.) and with different protocols. This component is used, for example, for interactive interfaces like data broadcasting (ARIB STD-B24) and electronic program guides (EPG).

=== Interfaces and Encryption ===
The ISDB specification describes a lot of (network) interfaces, but most importantly, the Common Interface for Conditional Access System (CAS). While ISDB has examples of implementing various kinds of CAS systems, in Japan, a CAS system called "B-CAS" is used. ARIB STD-B25 defines the Common Scrambling Algorithm (CSA) system called MULTI2 required for (de-)scrambling television.

The ISDB CAS system in Japan is operated by a company named B-CAS; the CAS card is called B-CAS card. The Japanese ISDB signal is always encrypted by the B-CAS system even if it is a free television program. That is why it is commonly called "Pay per view system without charge". An interface for mobile reception is under consideration.

ISDB supports RMP (Rights management and protection). Since all digital television (DTV) systems carry digital data content, a DVD or high-definition (HD) recorder could easily copy content losslessly. US major film studios requested copy protection; this was the main reason for RMP being mandated. The content has three modes: "copy once", "copy free" and "copy never". In "copy once" mode, a program can be stored on a hard disk recorder, but cannot be further copied; only moved to another copy-protected media—and this move operation will mark the content "copy one generation", which is mandated to prevent further copying permanently. "Copy never" programs may only be timeshifted and cannot be permanently stored. In 2006, the Japanese government is evaluating using the Digital Transmission Content Protection (DTCP) "Encryption plus Non-Assertion" mechanism to allow making multiple copies of digital content between compliant devices.

== Receiver ==
There are two types of ISDB receiver: Television and set-top box. The aspect ratio of an ISDB-receiving television set is 16:9; televisions fulfilling these specs are called Hi-Vision TV. There are four TV types: Cathode-ray tube (CRT), plasma display panel (PDP), organic light-emitting diode (OLED) and liquid crystal display (LCD), with LCD being the most popular Hi-Vision TV on the Japanese market nowadays.

The LCD share, as measured by JEITA in November 2004, was about 60%. While PDP sets occupy the high-end market with units that are over 50 inches (1270 mm), PDP and CRT set shares are about 20% each. CRT sets are considered low end for Hi-Vision. An STB is sometimes referred to as a digital tuner.

Typical middle to high-end ISDB receivers marketed in Japan have several interfaces:

- F connectors for RF input.
- HDMI or D4 connector for an HDTV monitor in a home cinema.
- Optical digital audio interface for an audio amplifier and speakers for 5.1 surround audio in a home cinema.
- IEEE 1394 (aka FireWire) interface for digital data recorders (like DVD recorders) in a home cinema.
- RCA video jack provides SDTV signal that is sampled down from the HDTV signal for analog CRT television sets or VCRs.
- RCA audio jacks provide stereo audio for analog CRT television sets or VCRs.
- S video is for VCRs or analog CRT television sets.
- 10/100 and modular jack telephone line modem interfaces are for an internet connection.
- B-CAS card interface to de-scramble.
- IR interface jack for controlling a VHS or DVD player.

== Services ==
A typical Japanese broadcast service consists as follows:

1. One HDTV or up to three SDTV services within one channel.
2. Provides interactive television through datacasting.
3. Interactive services such as games or shopping, via telephone line or broadband internet.
4. Equipped with an electronic program guide.
5. Ability to send firmware patches for the TV/tuner over the air.
6. During emergencies, the service utilizes Emergency Warning Broadcast System to quickly inform the public of various threats for the areas at risk.

There are examples providing more than 10 SDTV services with H.264 coding in some countries.

== ISDB-S ==
=== History ===
Japan started digital broadcasting using the DVB-S standard by PerfecTV in October/1996, and DirecTV also in December/1997, with communication satellites. Still, DVB-S did not satisfy the requirements of Japanese broadcasters, such as NHK, key commercial broadcasting stations like Nippon Television, TBS, Fuji Television, TV Asahi, TV Tokyo, and WOWOW (Movie-only Pay-TV broadcasting). Consequently, ARIB developed a new broadcast standard called ISDB-S. The requirements were HDTV capability, interactive services, network access and effective frequency utilization, and other technical requirements. The DVB-S standard allows the transmission of a bitstream of roughly 34 Mbit/s with a satellite transponder, which means the transponder can send one HDTV channel. Unfortunately, the NHK broadcasting satellite had only four vacant transponders, which led ARIB and NHK to work on ISDB-S: the new standard could transmit at 51 Mbit/s with a single transponder, which means that ISDB-S is 1.5 times more efficient than DVB-S and that one transponder can transmit two HDTV channels, along with other independent audio and data. Digital satellite broadcasting (BS digital) was started by NHK and followed commercial broadcasting stations on 1 December 2000. Today, SKY PerfecTV! (the successor of Skyport TV and Sky D), CS burn, Platone, EP, DirecTV, J Sky B, and PerfecTV!, adopted the ISDB-S system for use on the 110-degree (east longitude) wide-band communication satellite.

=== Technical specification ===
This table shows the summary of ISDB-S (satellite digital broadcasting).

Transmission channel coding	Modulation	TC8PSK, QPSK, BPSK (Hierarchical transmission)	
Transmission channel coding	Error correction coding	Inner coding	Trellis [TC8PSK] and Convolution
Transmission channel coding	Error correction coding	Outer coding	RS (204,188)
Transmission channel coding	Error correction coding	TMCC	Convolution coding+RS
Transmission channel coding	Time domain multiplexing	TMCC	
Conditional Access		Multi-2	
Data broadcasting		ARIB STD-B24 (BML, ECMA script)	
Service information		ARIB STD-B10	
Multiplexing		MPEG-2 Systems	
Audio coding		MPEG-2 Audio (AAC)	
Video coding		MPEG-2 Video	

=== Channel ===
Frequency and channel specification of Japanese Satellites using ISDB-S

Method	BS digital broadcasting	Wide band CS digital broadcasting
Frequency band	11.7 to 12.2 GHz	12.2 to 12.75 GHz
Transmission bit rate	51 Mbit/s (TC8PSK)	40 Mbit/s (QPSK)
Transmission band width	34.5 MHz*	34.5 MHz
*Compatible with 27 MHz band satellite transponder for analog FM broadcasting.

=== ISDB-S3 ===
ISDB-S3 is a satellite digital broadcasting specification supporting 4K, 8K, HDR, HFR, and 22.2 audio.

== ISDB-C ==
ISDB-C is a cable digital broadcasting specification. The technical specification J.83/C is developed by JCTEA. ISDB-C is identical to DVB-C but has a different channel bandwidth of 6 MHz (instead of 8 MHz) and roll-off factor.

== ISDB-T ==
=== History ===
HDTV was invented at NHK Science & Technology Research Laboratories (Japan Broadcasting Corporation's Science & Technical Research Laboratories). The research for HDTV started as early as the 1960s, though a standard was proposed to the ITU-R (CCIR) only in 1973.

By the 1980s, a high definition television camera, cathode-ray tube, videotape recorder, and editing equipment, among others, had been developed. In 1982 NHK developed MUSE (Multiple sub-Nyquist sampling encoding), the first HDTV video compression and transmission system. MUSE used digital video compression, but for transmission frequency modulation was used after a digital-to-analog converter converted the digital signal.

In 1987, NHK demonstrated MUSE in Washington D.C. as well as NAB. The demonstration made a great impression in the U.S., leading to the development of the ATSC terrestrial DTV system. Europe also developed a digital TV system called DVB. Japan began R&D of a completely digital system in the 1980s that led to ISDB. Japan began terrestrial digital broadcasting, using ISDB-T standard by NHK and commercial broadcasting stations, on 1 December 2003.

=== Features ===
Treeview of ISDB-T, channels, Segments and arranging multiple program broadcasting.

ISDB-T is characterized by the following features:

- ISDB-T (Integrated Services Digital Broadcasting-Terrestrial) in Japan use UHF 470 MHz-710 MHz, bandwidth of 240 MHz, allocate 40 channels namely channels 13 to 52 (previously used also 710 MHz-770 MHz, 53 to 62, but this range was reassigned to cell phones), each channel is 6 MHz width (actually 5.572 MHz effective bandwidth and 430 kHz guard band between channels). These channels are called "physical channel(物理チャンネル)". For other countries, US channel table or European channel table are used.
- For channel tables with 6 MHz width, ISDB-T single channel bandwidths 5.572 MHz has number of carriers 5,617 with interval of 0.99206 kHz. For 7 MHz channel, channel bandwidth is 6.50 MHz; for 8 MHz 7.42 MHz.
- ISDB-T allows to accommodate any combination of HDTV (roughly 8 Mbit/s in H.264) and SDTV (roughly 2 Mbit/s in H.264) within the given bitrate determined by the transmission parameters such as bandwidth, code-rate, guard interval, etc. Typically, among the 13 segments, the center segment is used for 1seg with QPSK modulation and the remaining 12 segments for the HDTV or SDTV payloads for 64QAM modulation. The bitstream of the 12 segments are combined into one transport stream, within which any combination of programs can be carried based on the MPEG-2 transport stream definition.
- ISDB-T transmits an HDTV channel and a mobile TV channel 1seg within one channel. 1seg is a mobile terrestrial digital audio/video broadcasting service in Japan. Although 1seg is designed for mobile usage, reception is sometimes problematic in moving vehicles. Because of reception on high speed vehicle, UHF transmission is shaded by buildings and hills frequently, but reported well receiving in Shinkansen as far as run in flat or rural area.
- ISDB-T provides interactive services with data broadcasting. Such as Electronic Program Guides. ISDB-T supports internet access as a return channel that works to support the data broadcasting. Internet access is also provided on mobile phones.
- ISDB-T provides Single-Frequency Network (SFN) and on-channel repeater technology. SFN makes efficient utilization of the frequency resource (spectrum). For example, the Kanto area (greater Tokyo area including most part of Tokyo prefecture and some part of Chiba, Ibaragi, Tochigi, Saitama and Kanagawa prefecture) are covered with SFN with roughly 10 million population coverage.
- ISDB-T can be received indoors with a simple indoor antenna.
- ISDB-T provides robustness to multipath interference ("ghosting"), co-channel analog television interference, and electromagnetic interferences that come from motor vehicles and power lines in urban environments.
- ISDB-T is claimed to allow HDTV to be received on moving vehicles at over 100 km/h; DVB-T can only receive SDTV on moving vehicles, and it is claimed that ATSC can not be received on moving vehicles at all (however, in early 2007 there were reports of successful reception of ATSC on laptops using USB tuners in moving vehicles).

=== Adoption ===
ISDB-T was adopted for commercial transmissions in Japan in December 2003. It currently comprises a market of about 100 million television sets. ISDB-T had 10 million subscribers by the end of April 2005. Along with the wide adoption of ISDB-T, the price of receivers is decreasing over time. The price of ISDB-T STB in the lower end of the market is ¥19800 as of 19 April 2006. By November 2007 only a few older, low-end STB models could be found in the Japanese market (average price U$180), showing a tendency towards replacement by mid to high-end equipment like PVRs and TV sets with inbuilt tuners. In November 2009, a retail chain AEON introduced STB in US$40, followed by variety of low-cost tuners. The Dibeg web page confirms this tendency by showing low significance of the digital tuner STB market in Japan.

Brazil, which used an analogue TV system (PAL-M) that slightly differed from any other countries, has chosen ISDB-T as a base for its DTV format, calling it ISDB-Tb or internally SBTVD (Sistema Brasileiro de Televisão Digital-Terrestre). The Japanese DiBEG group incorporated the advancements made by Brazil (MPEG4 video codec instead of ISDB-T's MPEG2 and a powerful interaction middleware called Ginga) and renamed the standard to "ISDB-T International". Other than Argentina, Brazil, Peru, Chile and Ecuador which have selected ISDB-Tb, there are other South American countries, mainly from Mercosur, such as Venezuela, that chose ISDB-Tb, which providing economies of scale and common market benefits from the regional South American manufacturing instead of importing ready-made STBs as is the case with the other standards. Also, it has been confirmed with extensive tests realized by Brazilian Association of Radio and Television Broadcasters (ABERT), Brazilian Television Engineering Society (SET) and Universidade Presbiteriana Mackenzie the insufficient quality for indoor reception presented by ATSC and, between DVB-T and ISDB-T, the latter presented superior performance in indoor reception and flexibility to access digital services and TV programs through non-mobile, mobile or portable receivers with impressive quality.

The ABERT–SET group in Brazil did system comparison tests of DTV under the supervision of the CPqD foundation. The comparison tests were done under the direction of a work group of SET and ABERT. The ABERT/SET group selected ISDB-T as the best choice in digital broadcasting modulation systems among ATSC, DVB-T and ISDB-T. Another study found that ISDB-T and DVB-T performed similarly, and that both were outperformed by DVB-T2.

ISDB-T was singled out as the most flexible of all for meeting the needs of mobility and portability. It is most efficient for mobile and portable reception. On June 29, 2006, Brazil announced ISDB-T-based SBTVD as the chosen standard for digital TV transmissions, to be fully implemented by 2016. By November 2007 (one month prior DTTV launch), a few suppliers started to announce zapper STBs of the new Nippon-Brazilian SBTVD-T standard, at that time without interactivity.

As in 2019, the implementation rollout in Brazil proceeded successfully, with terrestrial analog services (PAL-M) phased out in most of the country (for some less populated regions, analog signal shutdown was postponed to 2023).

==== Adoption by country ====
This lists the other countries who adopted the ISDB-T standard, chronologically arranged.

- On 30 June 2006, Brazil announced its decision to adopt ISDB-T as the digital terrestrial television standard, by means of presidential decree 5820/2006.
- On 23 April 2009, Peru announced its decision to adopt ISDB-T as the digital terrestrial television standard. This decision was taken on the basis of the recommendations by the Multi-sectional Commission to assess the most appropriate standard for the country.
- On 28 August 2009, Argentina officially adopted the ISDB-T system calling it internally SATVD-T (Sistema Argentino de Televisión Digital – Terrestre).
- On 14 September 2009, Chile announced it was adopting the ISDB-T standard because it adapts better to the geographical makeup of the country, while allowing signal reception in cell phones, high-definition content delivery and a wider variety of channels.
- On 6 October 2009, Venezuela officially adopted the ISDB-T standard.
- On 26 March 2010, Ecuador announced its decision to adopt ISDB-T standard. This decision was taken on the basis of the recommendations by the Superintendent of Telecommunications.
- On 29 April 2010, Costa Rica officially announced the adoption of ISDB-Tb standard based upon a commission in charge of analyzing which protocol to accept.
- On 1 June 2010, Paraguay officially adopted ISDB-T, via a presidential decree #4483.
- On 11 June 2010, the Philippines (NTC) officially adopted the ISDB-T standard.
- On 6 July 2010, Bolivia announced its decision to adopt ISDB-T standard as well.
- On 27 December 2010, the Uruguayan Government adopts the ISDB-T standard., voiding a previous 2007 decree which adopted the European DVB system.
- On 15 November 2011, the Maldivian Government adopts the ISDB-T standard. As the first country in the region that use European channel table and 1 channel bandwidth is 8 MHz.
- On 26 February 2013, the Botswana government adopts the ISDB-T standard; as the first country within the SADC region and even the first country within the continent of Africa as a whole.
- On 12 September 2013, Honduras adopted the ISDB-T standard.
- On 20 May 2014, Government of Sri Lanka officially announced its decision to adopt ISDB-T standard, and on 7 September 2014, Japanese Prime Minister Junichiro Koizumi signed an agreement with Sri Lankan President Chandrika Kumaratunga for constructing infrastructure such as ISDB-T networks with a view to smooth conversion to ISDB-T, and cooperating in the field of content and developing human resources.
- On 23 January 2017, El Salvador adopted the ISDB-T standard.
- On 20 March 2019, Angola adopted the ISDB-T standard.
- In August 2015, Nicaragua adopted the ISDB-T standard.
- In September 2018, Belize adopted the ISDB-T standard.
- In late 2010s, St. Kitts & Nevis adopted the ISDB-T standard.

=== Technical specification ===
Segment structure

ARIB has developed a segment structure called BST-OFDM (see figure). ISDB-T divides the frequency band of one channel into thirteen segments. The broadcaster can select which combination of segments to use; this choice of segment structure allows for service flexibility. For example, ISDB-T can transmit both LDTV and HDTV using one TV channel or change to 3 SDTV, a switch that can be performed at any time. ISDB-T can also change the modulation scheme at the same time.

s11	s 9	s 7	s 5	s 3	s 1	s 0	s 2	s 4	s 6	s 8	s10	s12

The above figure shows the spectrum of 13 segments structure of ISDB-T.
(s0 is generally used for 1seg, s1-s12 are used for one HDTV or three SDTVs)

==== Summary of ISDB-T ====
Transmission channel coding	Modulation	64QAM-OFDM, 16QAM-OFDM, QPSK-OFDM, DQPSK-OFDM (Hierarchical transmission)	
Transmission channel coding	Error correction coding	Data: Inner coding: Convolutional 7/8,5/6,3/4,2/3,1/2; Outer coding: Reed-Solomon(204,188)	TMCC: Shortened code (184,102) of Difference Cyclic Code (273,191)
Transmission channel coding	Guard interval	1/32,1/16,1/8,1/4	
Transmission channel coding	Interleaving	Time, Frequency, bit, byte	
Transmission channel coding	Frequency domain multiplexing	BST-OFDM (Segmented structure OFDM)	
Conditional Access		Multi-2	
Data broadcasting		ARIB STD-B24 (BML, ECMA script)	
Service information		ARIB STD-B10	
Multiplexing		MPEG-2 Systems	
Audio coding		MPEG-2 Audio (AAC)	
Video coding		MPEG-2 Video	MPEG-4 AVC /H.264*

- H.264 Baseline profile is used in one segment (1seg) broadcasting for portables and Mobile phone.
- H.264 High-profile is used in ISDB-Tb to high definition broadcasts.

=== Channel ===
Specification of Japanese terrestrial digital broadcasting using ISDB-T.

Method	Terrestrial digital broadcasting
Frequency band	VHF/UHF, super high band
Transmission bit rate	23 Mbit/s(64QAM)
Transmission band width	5.6 MHz*

=== ISDB-Tsb ===
ISDB-Tsb is the terrestrial digital sound broadcasting specification. The technical specification is the same as ISDB-T. ISDB-Tsb supports the coded transmission of OFDM signals.

=== ISDB-Tmm ===
ISDB-Tmm (Terrestrial mobile multi-media) utilised suitable number of segments by station with video coding MPEG-4 AVC/H.264. With multiple channels, ISDB-Tmm served dedicated channels such as sport, movie, music channels and others with CD quality sound, allowing for better broadcast quality as compared to 1seg. This service used the VHF band, 207.5–222 MHz which began to be utilised after Japan's switchover to digital television in July 2011.

Japan's Ministry of Internal Affairs and Communications licensed to NTT Docomo subsidiary mmbi, Inc. for ISDB-Tmm method on September 9, 2010. The MediaFLO method offered with KDDI was not licensed.

The ISDB-Tmm broadcasting service by mmbi, Inc. is named モバキャス (pronounced mobakyasu), literally short form of mobile casting on July 14, 2011, and had been branded as NOTTV since October 4, 2011. The Minister of Internal Affairs and Communications approved the start of operations of NOTTV on October 13, 2011. Planning the service with monthly subscription fee of 420 yen for south Kanto Plain, Aichi, Osaka, Kyoto and some other prefectures from April 1, 2012. The deployment plan was to cover approximately 73% of households by the end of 2012, approximately 91% by the end of 2014, and 125 stations or repeaters to be installed in 2016 to cover cities nationwide. Android smartphones and tablets with ISDB-Tmm receiving capability were also sold mainly by NTT DoCoMo, although a separate tuner (TV BoX manufactured by Huawei; or StationTV manufactured by Pixela) could be purchased for iPhones and iPads as well as Android smartphones and tablets sold by au by KDDI and SoftBank Mobile to receive ISDB-Tmm broadcasts.

Due to the continued unprofitability of NOTTV, mmbi, Inc. shut down the service on June 30, 2016.

== 2.6 GHz Mobile satellite digital audio/video broadcasting ==
MobaHo! is the name of the services that uses the Mobile satellite digital audio broadcasting specifications. MobaHo! started its service on 20 October 2004. It ended on 31 March 2009.

== Standards ==
ARIB and JCTEA developed the following standards. Some part of standards are located on the pages of ITU-R and ITU-T.

Channel	Communication Satellite television	Broadcasting Communication Satellite television	Terrestrial television	Satellite Sound	Terrestrial Sound	Cable television
Nickname	-	ISDB-S	ISDB-T	2.6 GHz mobile broadcasting	ISDB-Tsb	64QAM, Trans-modulation (ISDB-C)
Transmission	DVB-S	ARIB STD-B20	ARIB STD-B31	ARIB STD-B41	ARIB STD-B29	-
Transmission	-	ITU-R BO.1408	ITU-R BT.1306-1	-	ITU-R BS.1114	ITU-T J.83 Annex C, J.183
Receiver	ARIB STD-B16	ARIB STD-B21		ARIB STD-B42	ARIB STD-B30	JCTEA STD-004, STD-007
Server type broadcasting	-	ARIB STD-B38				-
Conditional access	-	ARIB STD-B25 (Multi-2)				JCTEA STD-001
Service information	-	ARIB STD-B10				JCTEA STD-003
Data broadcasting	-	ARIB STD-B24 (BML), ARIB STD-B23 (EE or MHP like)				-
Video/Audio compression and multiplexing	MPEG-2	ARIB STD-B32 (MPEG)				-
Technical report	-	ARIB TR-B13	ARIB TR-B14	-	-	-

== Table of terrestrial HDTV transmission systems ==
Table 1: Main characteristics of three DTTB systems
Systems	ATSC 8-VSB	DVB COFDM	ISDB BST-COFDM
Source coding
Video	Main profile syntax of ISO/IEC 13818-2 (MPEG-2 – video)		
Audio	ATSC Standard A/52 (Dolby AC-3)	ISO/IEC 13818-2 (MPEG-2 – layer II audio) and Dolby AC-3	ISO/IEC 13818-7 (MPEG-2 – AAC audio)
Transmission system
Channel coding	-		
Outer coding	R-S (207, 187, t = 10)	R-S (204, 188, t = 8)	
Outer interleaver	52 R-S block interleaver	12 R-S block interleaver	
Inner coding	Rate 2/3 trellis code	Punctured convolution code: Rate 1/2, 2/3,3/4, 5/6, 7/8 Constraint length = 7, Polynomials (octal) = 171, 133	
Inner interleaver	12 to 1 trellis code interleaver	Bit-wise interleaving and frequency interleaving	Bit-wise interleaving, frequency interleaving and selectable time interleaving
Data randomization	16-bit PRBS		
Modulation	8-VSB and 16-VSB	COFDM; QPSK, 16QAM and 64QAM; Hierarchical modulation: multi-resolution constellation (16QAM and 64 QAM); Guard interval: 1/32, 1/16, 1/8 & 1/4 of OFDM symbol 2 modes: 2k and 8k FFT	BST-COFDM with 13 frequency segments DQPSK, QPSK, 16QAM and 64QAM; Hierarchical modulation: choice of three different modulations on each segment Guard interval: 1/32, 1/16, 1/8 & 1/4 of OFDM symbol 3 modes: 2k, 4k and 8k FFT

== See also ==
General category

- DiBEG – The Digital Broadcasting Experts Group
- Digital television
- Digital terrestrial television
- Digital radio
- Digital multimedia broadcasting (DMB)
- 1seg
- B-CAS
- Datacasting
- SDTV, EDTV, HDTV
- ISDB-T International (SBTVD) – Brazilian Digital Television System based on ISDB-T
- Tokyo Skytree – ISDB-T broadcasting for Kanto Plain

Transmission technology

- ATSC standards – Advanced Television Systems Committee Standard
- DMB-T – Digital Multimedia Broadcast—Terrestrial
- DVB-T – Digital Video Broadcasting—Terrestrial
- MPEG
- Single-frequency network (SFN), multi-frequency network (MFN)
