= B-CAS =

Japanese conditional access system

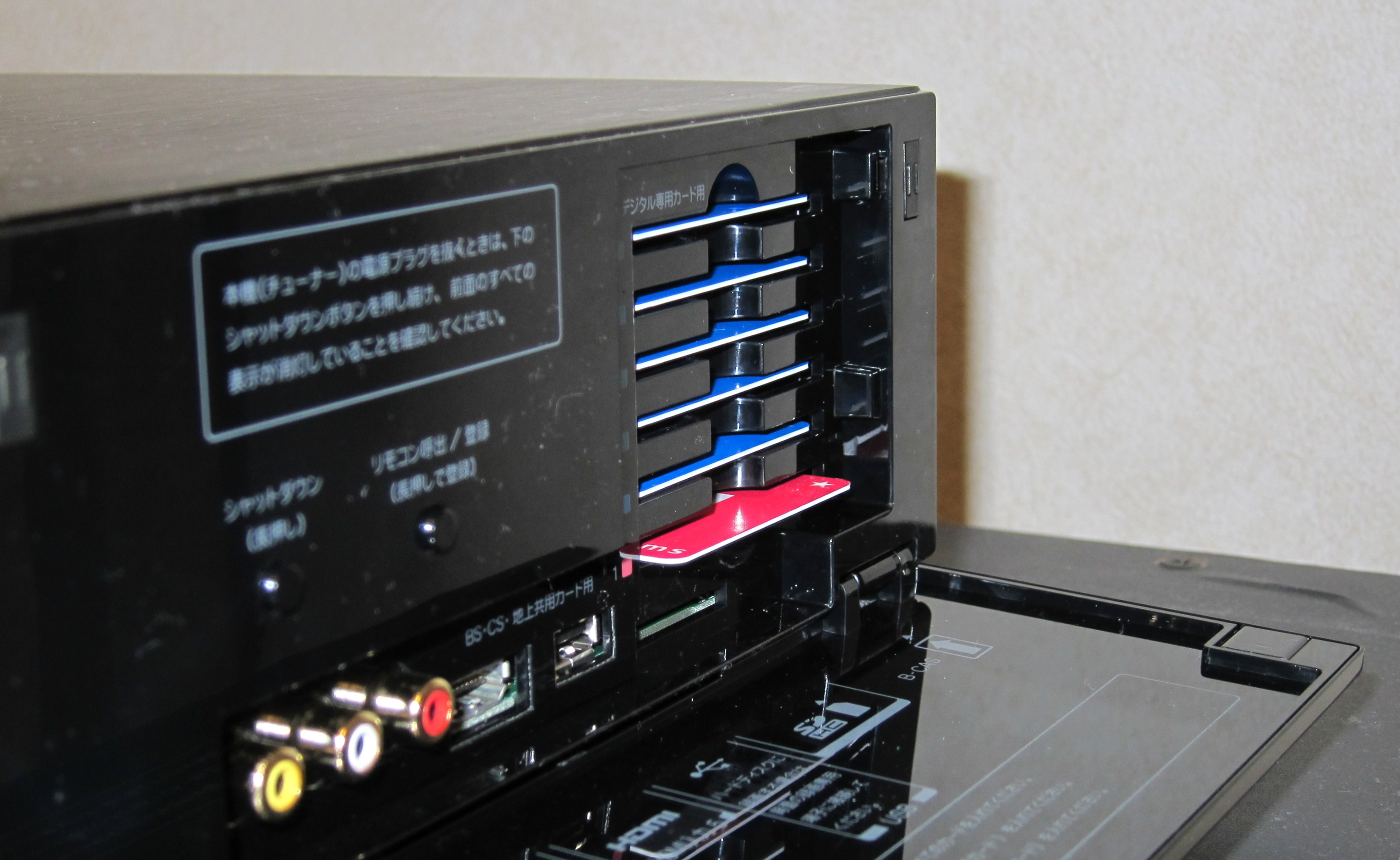
B-CAS cards in a Toshiba Cell Regza set-top box

B-CAS (BS Conditional Access Systems Co., Ltd.) is a vendor and operator of the ISDB CAS system in Japan, largely owned by the public broadcaster NHK with some other electronics companies and broadcasters airing in BSAT. It also refers to the reception method (B-CAS method) that this company offers.

All ISDB receiving apparatus such as DTT TV, tuner, and DVD recorder except 1seg-only devices require a B-CAS card under regulation and B-CAS cards are supplied with most units at purchase. B-CAS cards cannot be purchased separately, except in cases of damage, loss, purchase of used equipment, or theft. As of February 2025, replacement B-CAS cards cost ¥2,310.

Implementations of ISDB-T and ISDB-T International (SBTVD) outside Japan do not use the B-CAS system at all as they do not employ the Copy-Once encryption method used on ISDB broadcasts in Japan. For these countries, some operators may choose to implement their own copy protection system.

== Gallery ==
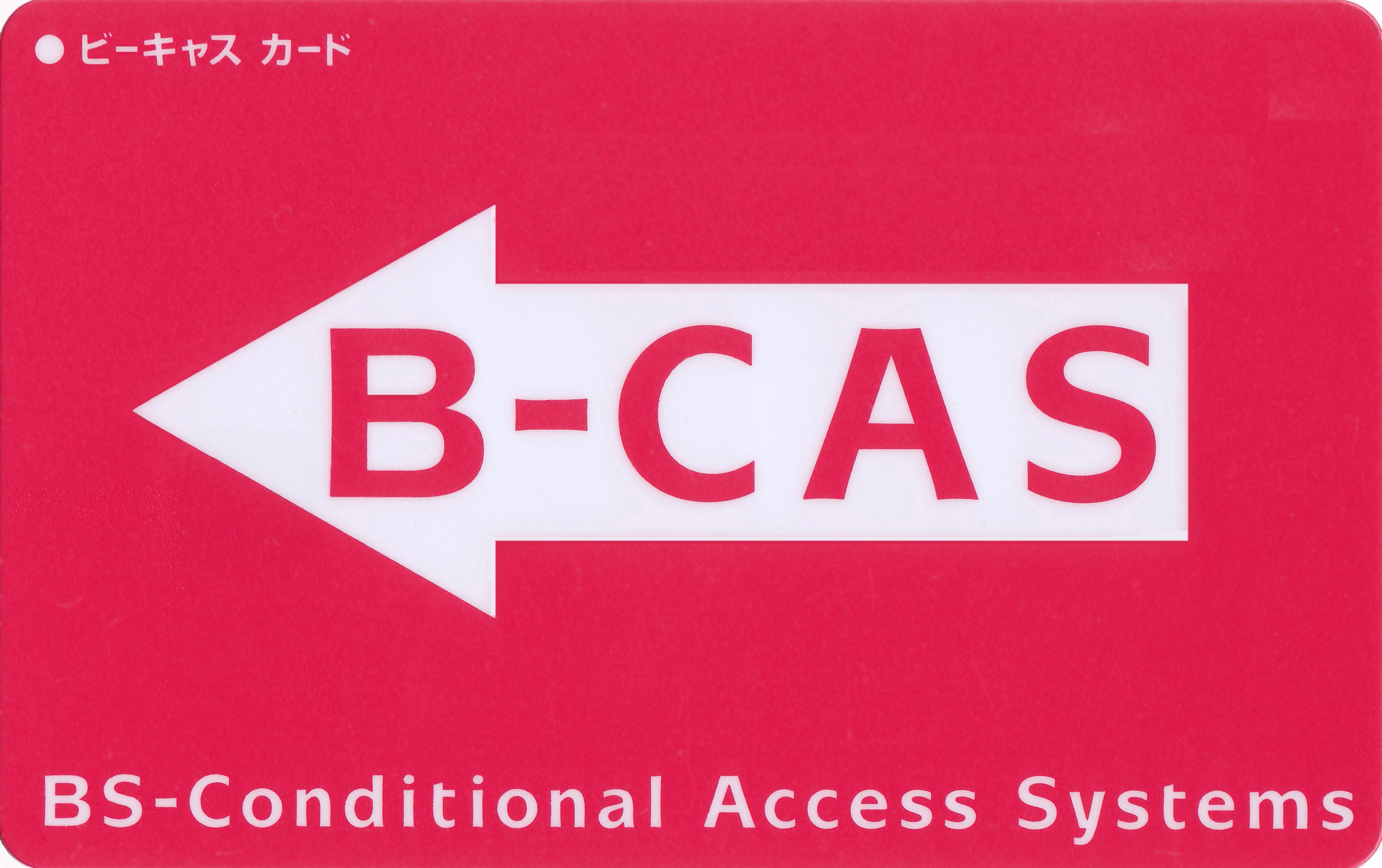
BS Digital use B-CAS card

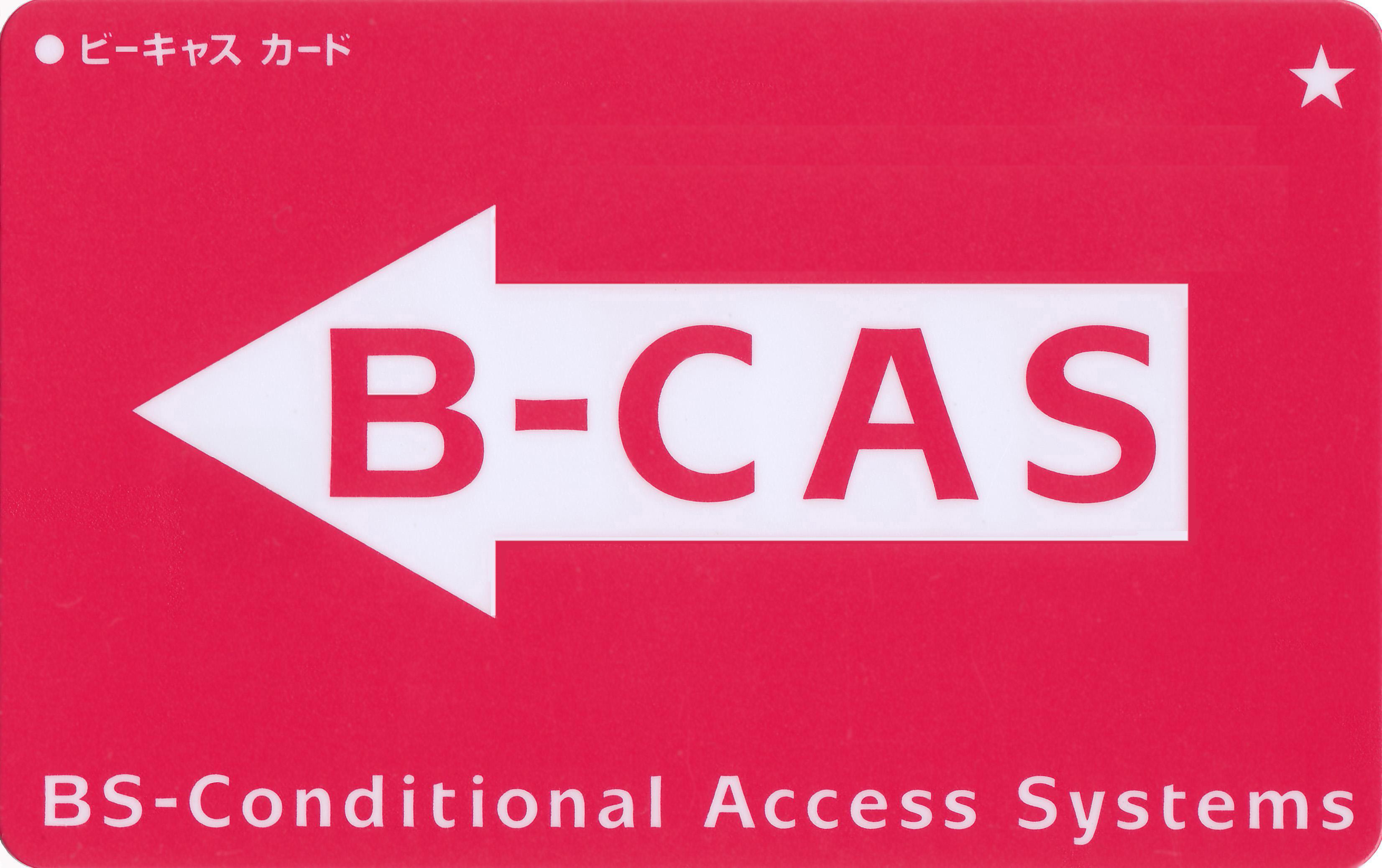
BS Digital CCI and Terrestrial Digital support mark B-CAS card

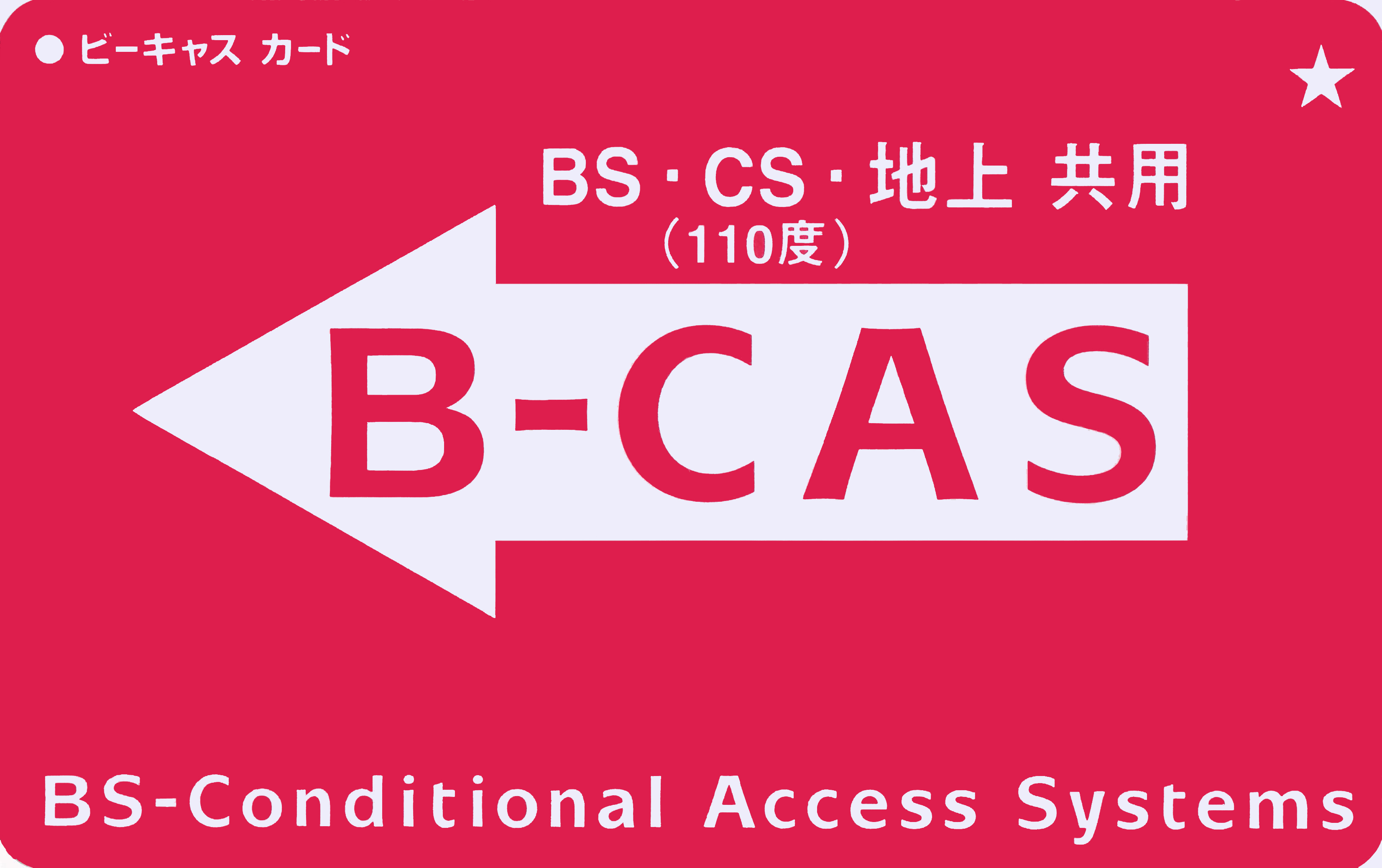
BS/110° CS/Terrestrial digital shared use B-CAS card

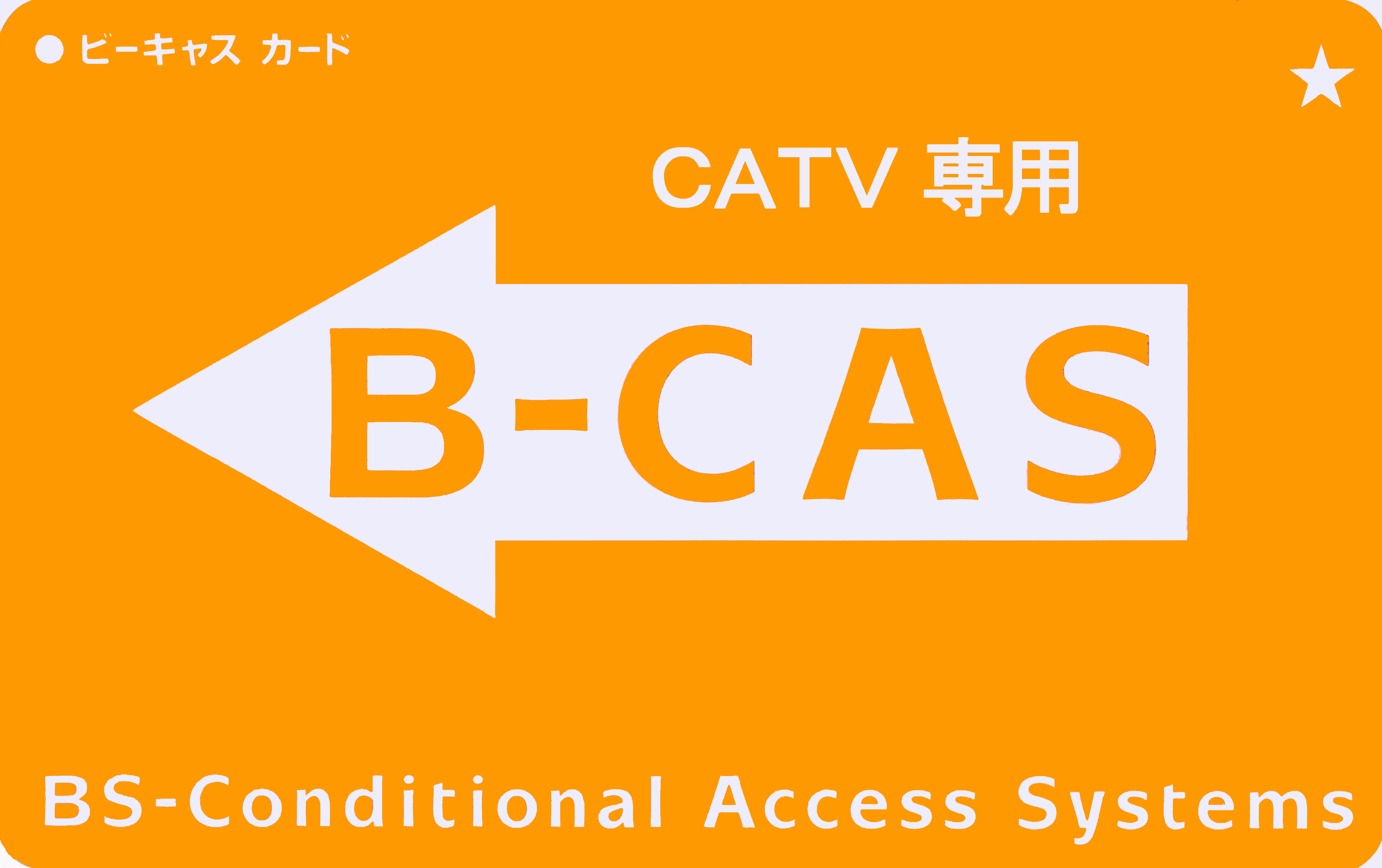
CATV exclusive use B-CAS card

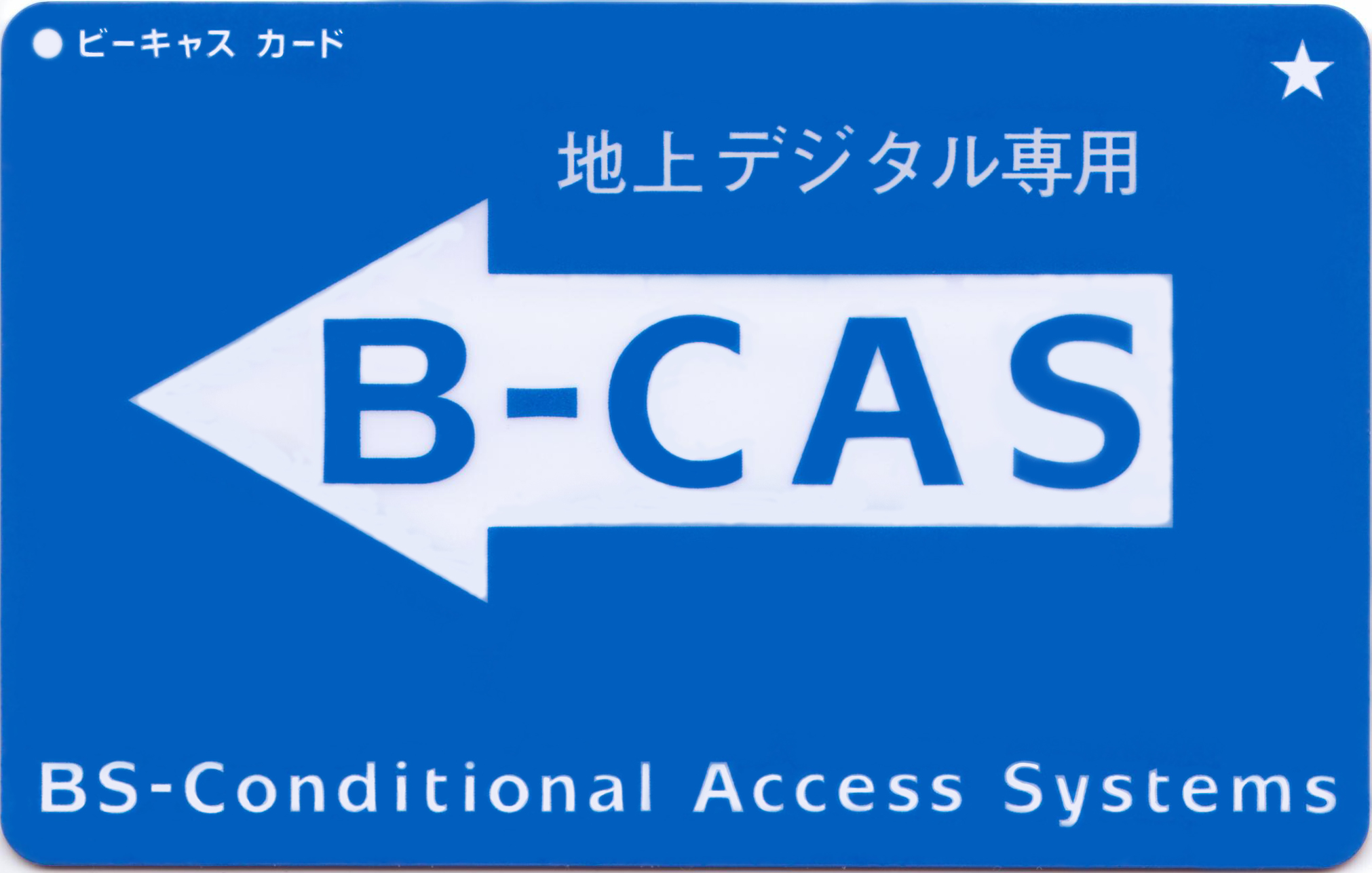
Terrestrial Digital exclusive use B-CAS card

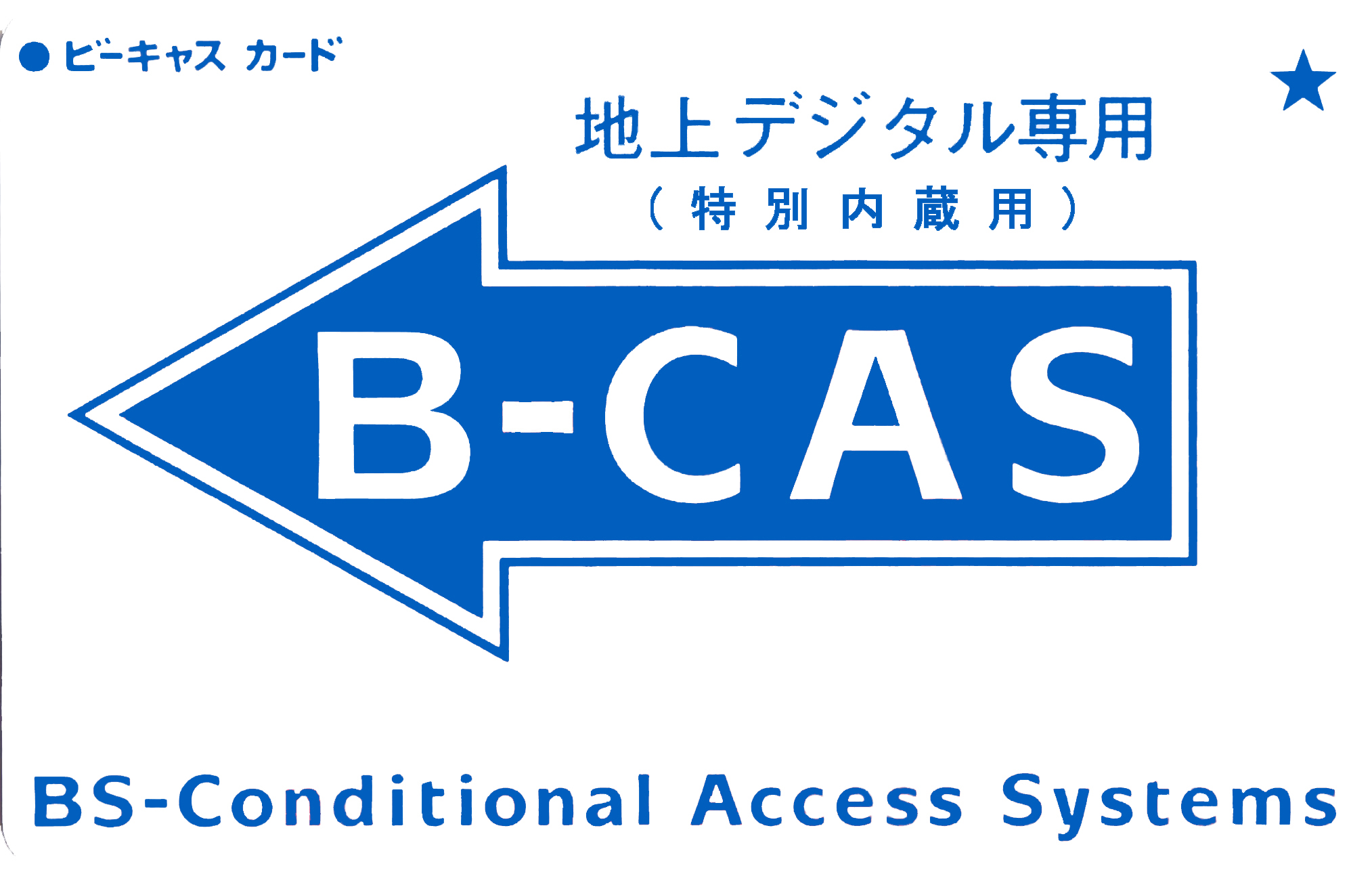
Terrestrial Digital exclusive use (Special internal use) B-CAS card

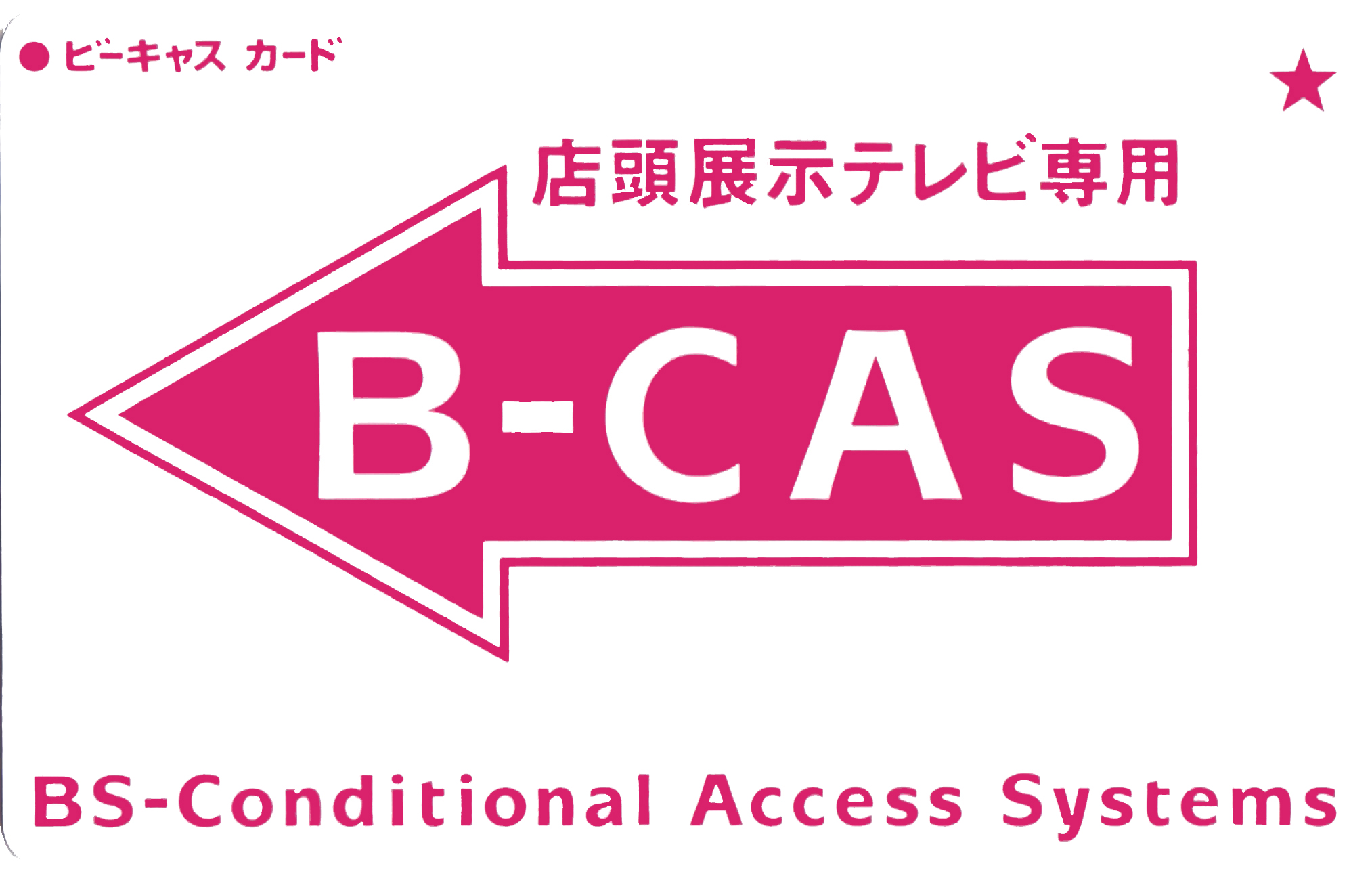
Shop use B-CAS card

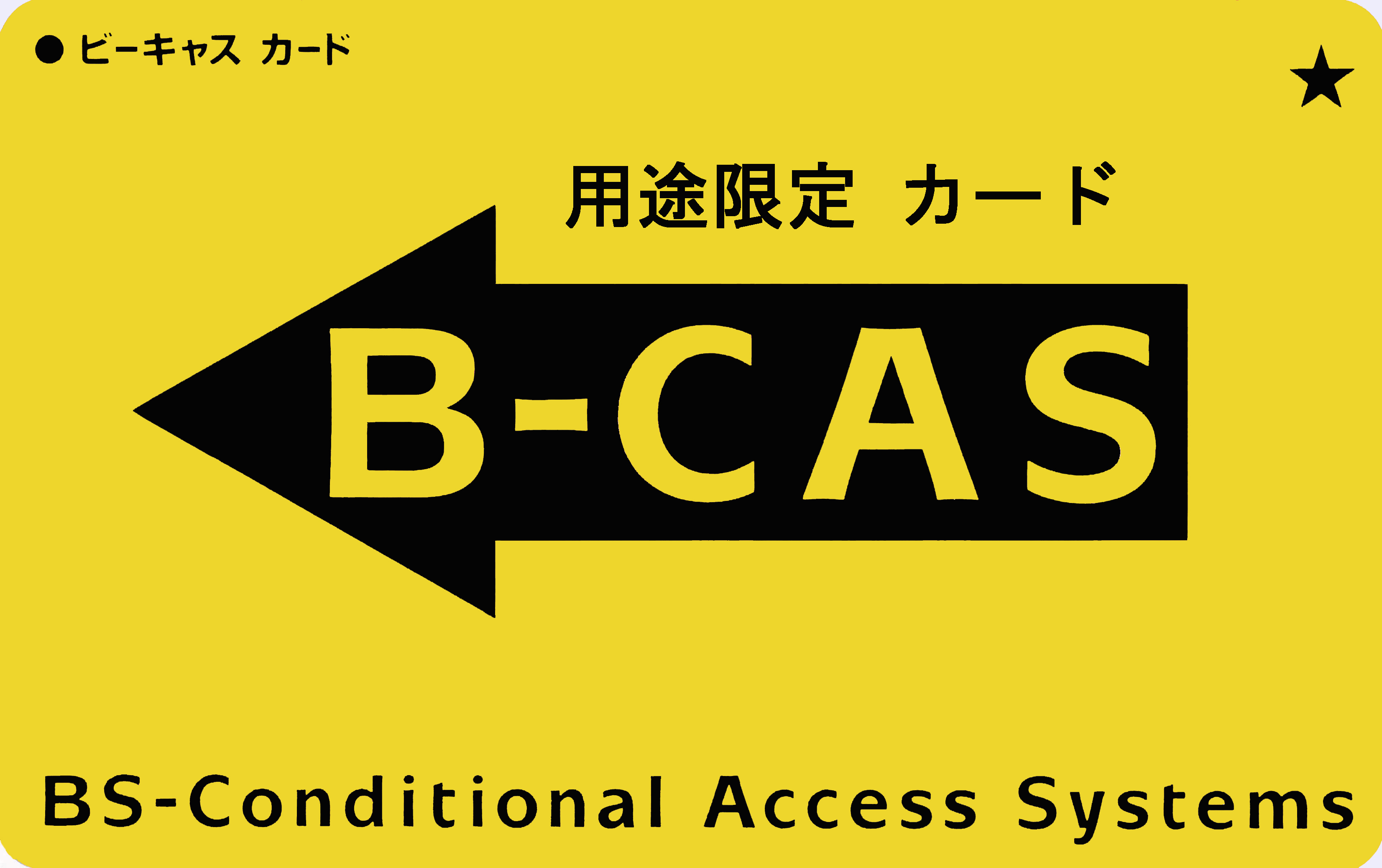
Pay broadcast demo use B-CAS card

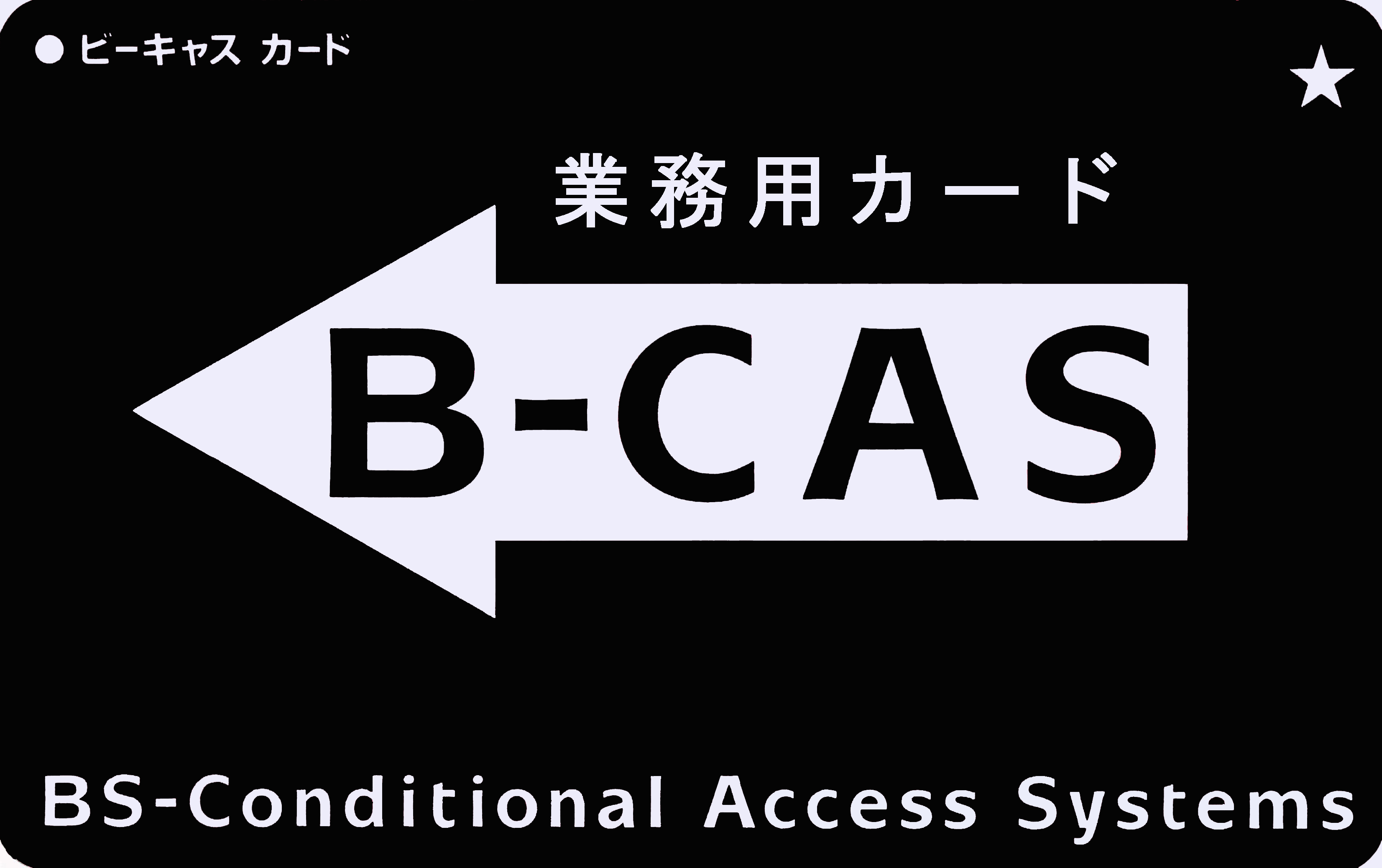
Business use B-CAS card

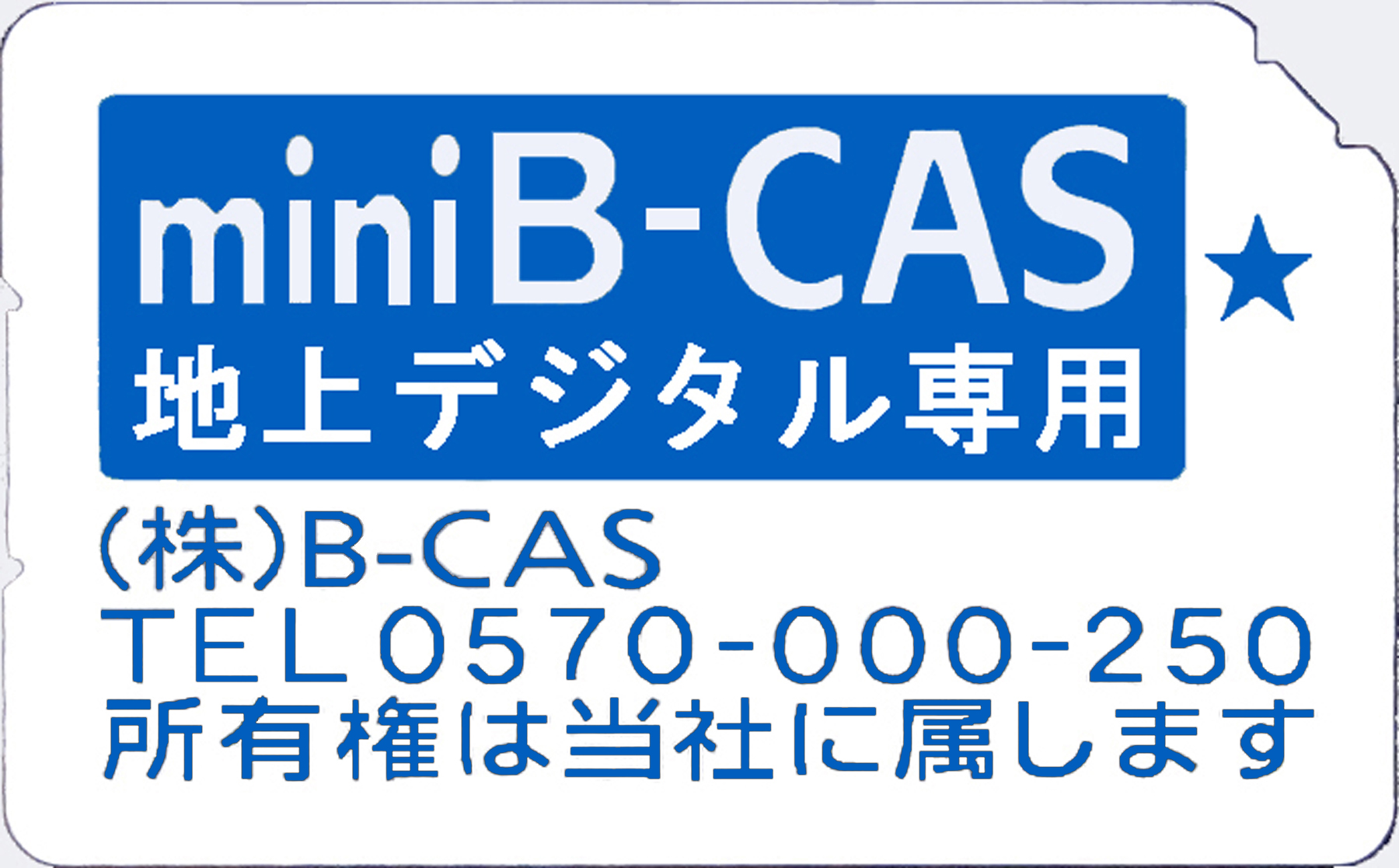
Terrestrial Digital mini B-CAS card

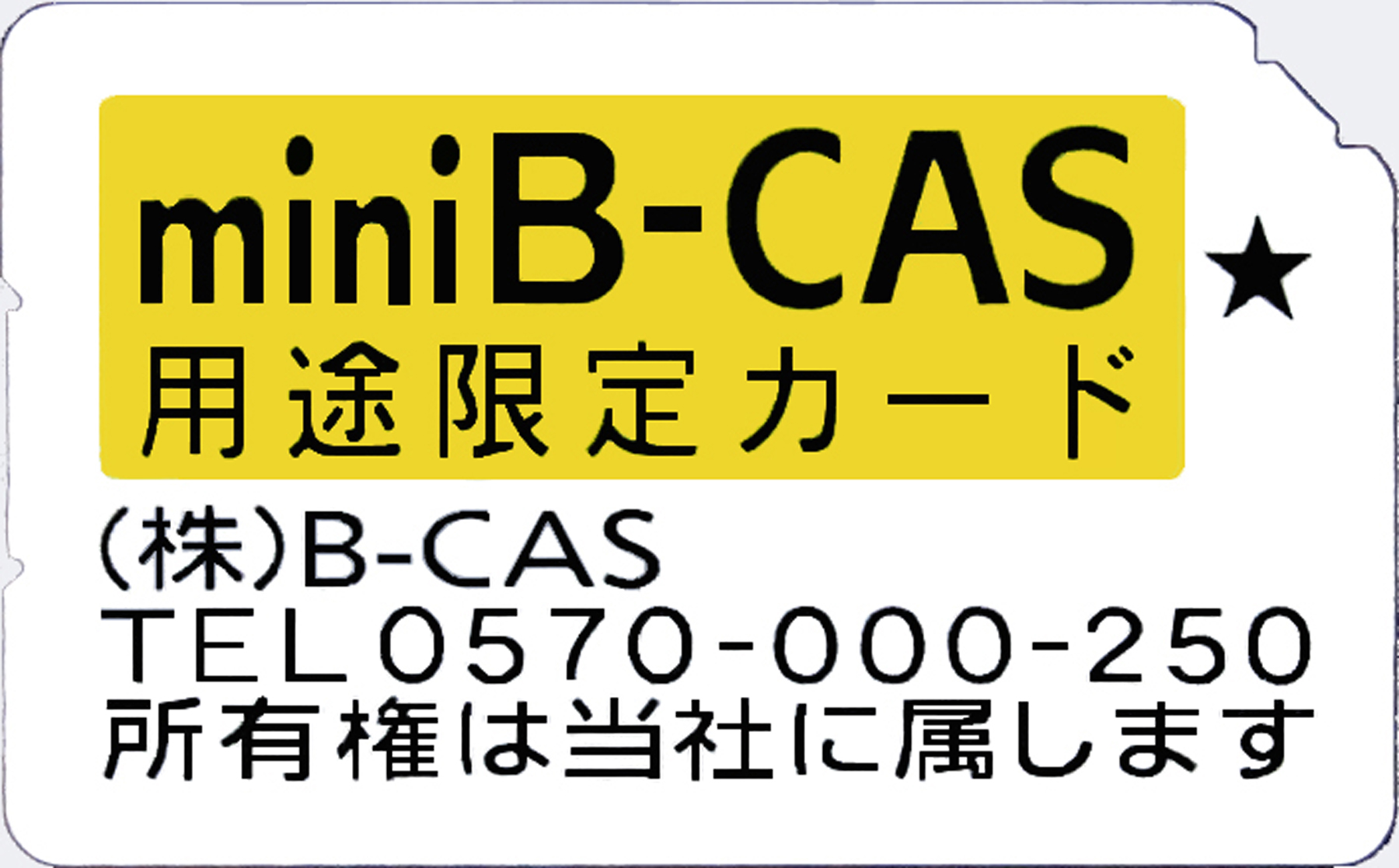
Limited use mini B-CAS card

== See also ==
- Integrated Services Digital Broadcasting
