= DiBEG =

DiBEG (The Digital Broadcasting Experts Group) was founded in September 1997 to promote ISDB-T International, the Digital Broadcasting System, in the world.

== See also ==
- ISDB
- ISDB-T International
