= ImageMixer =

ImageMixer is a brand name of video editing software that edits digital video and still image in camcorders and authors to VCD and DVD. It is a second-party Japanese product, distributed by Pixela Corporation, a Japanese manufacturer of PC peripheral hardware and multimedia software.

== Bundling ==
ImageMixer is widely used for several camcorder brands, such as JVC, Hitachi and Canon. Also, Sony has chosen to package ImageMixer with its DVD and HDD Handycam.

== ImageMixer series ==
ImageMixer has other series of software for digital camera, such as ImageMixer Label Maker and ImageMixer DVD dubbing. ImageMixer also has movie editing solution for Macintosh.

== Windows Vista version of ImageMixer ==
A Windows Vista version of ImageMixer has been developed (ImageMixer3).
