= Pixela Corporation =

Japanese technology manufacturer

- Type: Public
- Traded as: TYO: 6731
- Industry: Computer hardware Computer software
- Founded: June 21, 1982
- Headquarters: Osaka, Japan
- Key people: Hiroshi Fujioka (CEO)
- Products: ImageMixer; Capty MPEG Edit EX
- Revenue: 8,623 million yen
- Number of employees: 266
- Subsidiaries: Synthesis, RfStream, Pialex Technologies
- Website: www.pixela.co.jp/en/

Pixela Corporation is a Japanese manufacturer of PC peripheral hardware and multimedia software. The company is known for its software series, ImageMixer, which is currently bundled with some camcorders. Pixela is also famous for manufacturing 1seg Tuners in Japan. The company was founded June 21, 1982 and employs 266 people. The current CEO is Hiroshi Fujioka who is also a founding member Pixela Corporation. The company headquarters are in Osaka, Japan.

== Subsidiaries ==
Pixela owns subsidiaries in Japan and North America, such as Synthesis, Prodia, RfStream, and Pialex Technologies. These subsidiaries mainly produce microchips and video capture board.

== Pixela Shop ==
Pixela has an online shop, which sells ImageMixer series, other software, and some hardware. Also, the company operates the supporting website ImageMixer.

== See also ==
- ImageMixer
- List of Japanese companies
