= Indoor antenna =

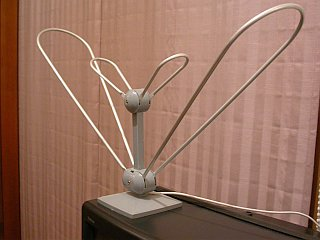
TV set-top indoor antenna ("Rabbit Ears") for VHF and UHF reception.

An indoor antenna is a type of radio or TV antenna placed indoors, as opposed to being mounted on the roof. They are usually considered a simple and cheap solution to receive transmissions. An indoor antenna is prone to picking up electrical noise, but digital broadcasts are resistant to this noise.

== Description ==
An indoor antenna is a type of radio or TV antenna placed indoors, as opposed to being mounted on the roof.

== Use ==
Indoor antennas are a common solution for cord cutting, with a variety of commercial options. They are usually considered a simple and cheap solution that may work well when the receiver is relatively near to the broadcasting transmitter and the building walls do not shield the radio waves too much.

Being close to other electric or electronic equipment in the building, an indoor antenna is prone to picking up more electrical noise that may interfere with a clear (analog) reception. Used for digital broadcast, the noise is less of a factor than analog broadcast, which recently makes this type of antenna a more popular solution.

Indoor antennas are used for radio reception, particularly the folded dipole constructed from twin-lead, which can be nailed to a skirting board.

== See also ==
- Indoor television antenna
