= Inview Technology =

Inview Technology Ltd
- Type: Broadcast and OTT solutions
- Industry: Media & telecoms
- Founded: 1996; Rebranded 2006
- Headquarters: Northwich, United Kingdom
- Key people: Nick Markham (Chairman); Ken Austin (Vice chairman); Julie Austin (CEO)
- Products: Inview Inside, EPG, Video on demand, set-top boxes, analogue switch off
- Number of employees: 85
- Parent: Private company
- Website: http://inview.tv/

Inview Technology (Inview Technology Ltd or simply Inview) is a UK-based digital TV software company. It specialises in advanced EPGs, interactive broadcasts, and IP services for Pay-TV and analogue switch off markets. Their OTT TV platform allows television broadcast and internet content to be simultaneously accessible to the viewer. The company is based in Northwich, Cheshire, UK and is privately owned.

Inview have been involved in digital TV in the UK since the late 1990s, providing software for set-top boxes manufactured by Digifusion, Thomson and Sony, alongside the Teletext Extra EPG (later renamed Radio Times Extra). Nick Markham, Inview's chairman, developed the concept of Freeview alongside the BBC and previously worked for Top-up TV. By late 2016, Inview were enabling digital switchover for whole countries such as Nigeria (started in June 2016) and which will provide a Freeview / Freesat type broadcasting platform and implement a BBC style license fee system to 30 million TV households.

The company was appointed in March 2015 by National Broadcasting Commission (NBC) to enable digital switchover from analogue throughout the country; it will also provide set-top box software and services including full EPG, Push Video-On-Demand, a range of broadcasting applications such as news and public service information.

A Mexican TV company, Dish Mexico, has appointed Inview to provide software and services.

Also in 2016, Inview was contracted to supply middleware for Cignal, the largest satellite provider in the Philippines, which enabled Cignal to directly communicate with their customers through the user interface, Inview's new EPG and other services such as advertising. This is all supplied within Zapper satellite boxes.

In 2014 and 2015 their partners include Humax and Skyworth, China's largest set-top box company, and silicon partners include Mstar and Broadcom. They signed a deal with Pico Digital, Inc. to develop the next generation set-top box for the Latin American market, as well as Dish Mexico.

== History ==
The company was started in 1996. Inview provided a chip based EPG, broadcast data service and a digital TV software platform for the free to air terrestrial market.

It was one of the first companies to launch a broadcast TV listings service, known as 4TVInteractive. However, in 2010 Inview ceased support for this service and this affected a number of Digifusion, Inverto, Thomson and Sony Set-top boxes and caused them to show only now and next information, rather than a full EPG.

== Services ==
Servies provided by Inview include whole country switch-over, OTT services, broadcast services, advertising, EPG, video on demand (VOD), Push-VOD#Push video on demand, Catch-Up TV, PVR, and legacy upgrades for older boxes.

=== Liberator ===
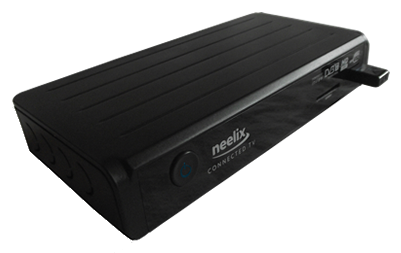
A set-top box with 'Inview Inside' which allows terrestrial TV and simultaneous internet connection.

In October 2012, Inview developed "Liberator 3", an OTT cloud-based platform for Pay TV operators and telcos wishing to equip their customers with tailor made connected set-top boxes for broadcast and broadband internet content.

=== Broadcast services ===
In territories where the broadband infrastructure is underdeveloped, Inview offers a broadcast service with advertising, Push-VOD, catch up TV and PVR.

=== Legacy upgrades ===
Inview's solution for existing (older) deployed set-top boxes is to offer applications including an EPG and TV apps that can run in devices with limited memory and processing power. By June 2015 Inview had upgraded over 10 million legacy set-top boxes worldwide.

=== Lolipop ===
Inview has developed the platform for a HDMI dongle streaming device called "Lolipop" which is controlled through a smartphone using gesture control. This allows content such as VOD, live-streamed channels and social networking apps to be viewed on a mobile device or on another TV without the need of a set-top box.

== Board members ==
In February 2014, Martin Edwards (Honorary Life President of Manchester United) and Koen Van Driel (ex-CEO of Thomson and Grundig Set-Top Box Divisions) were appointed Board Directors of Inview Technology.

== Partnerships ==
In 2014 their partners included: Kaon, Humax, Skyworth, Broadcom, Alitech, Mstar, Novatek, Farncombe, Goosat, Hopeful, ATech, Giec, MTC and MICO.

In previous years, Inview has been in partnership with companies such as Top Up TV, the On Demand Group (ODG) and Teletext.

== See also ==
- Enhanced TV
- Hybrid Broadcast Broadband TV
- Hybrid digital TV
- Interactive television
- List of digital distribution platforms for mobile devices
- Over-the-top content
