= ET5 =

ET5 may refer to:

- Nio ET5, a car produced by Chinese company Nio
- Skyworth EV6, introduced as Skywell ET5, a car produced by Chinese company Skyworth Auto
