= Julie Austin =

British CEO

- Occupation: CEO of Inview Technology
- Years active: 1990- present
- Known for: founder of Inview

Julie Austin is the chief executive officer of Inview Technology, the world-wide digital switch over enabling company and supplier of middleware for TV set top boxes. She is married to the inventor Ken Austin and lives in North Wales.

Julie Austin qualified as an accountant in the electronics industry. At 24 she became chief finance officer at Coloroll Carpets, in charge of a team of 25 people. After a number of management positions within electronics companies, she became joint founder and Director of Inview Interactive (which became Inview Technology) and 4TV. Inview launched the UK's first Electronic program guide (EPG) and Freeview. Between 1998 – 2008 she was in charge of all commercial operation, including finance, sales and contracts. During this time Inview launched the first listings services in the UK and also developed its push-VOD services. She became Chief Executive in 2009. Inview specialises in analogue switch off (ASO), legacy set-top box upgrades and new pay TV products.
