= Skywell =

Skywell may refer to:

- An alternative name for a lightwell, an open or windowed space in a ceiling to allow light to flow into a room.
- Skywell New Energy Automobile Group, owner of
  - Nanjing Golden Dragon Bus
  - Skyworth Auto
