= Digifusion =

- Industry: Consumer electronics
- Founded: 2002 (as Fusion Digital Technology Limited)
- Fate: Brand acquired by Beko
- Headquarters: United Kingdom
- Products: Digital terrestrial televisions, digital terrestrial receivers, Freeview PVRs (FVRT series)
- Owner: Beko (since 2005)
- Parent: Beko

Digifusion was the brand name of Fusion Digital Technology Limited, a British consumer electronics company that began trading in 2002, producing a range of digital terrestrial televisions and receivers. Fusion was part owned by Beko, the Turkish electronics giant, who were responsible for all product manufacture.

In 2005, Beko bought out Fusion Digital Technology, and took over the Digifusion brand.

== Products ==
The most notable Digifusion product to date was the FVRT series of Freeview PVRs, beginning with the FVRT100 in 2004. In common with Digifusion's basic receiver product, the FRT100, the FVRT100 PVR was one of the first Freeview products to feature a full 7 day (later extended to 14 day) electronic programme guide, or EPG, some months before Freeview itself began to broadcast full EPG data. This was achieved through the use of a proprietary "Multiguide" EPG.

The FVRT100 was one of the first Freeview PVRs which allowed the user to record two channels simultaneously – a claim it shared with its contemporary rival, the Thomson DHD-4000. Both boxes also featured 40GB hard disk drives, and were in fact based on the same reference design by 4TV Ltd, who were later to merge with Thomson.

The FVRT series also included the FVRT150 (a clone of the FVRT100 with an altered faceplate and 80GB HDD, sold by Argos), the FVRT145 (similar to the FVRT150 but with the front panel indicator lights removed), and the FVRT200, which added repeat recording and a personalised folders feature in the recording library. An FVRT400 was also announced, based on the FVRT200 but with a 160GB HDD, but very limited numbers of these machines were produced or sold through smaller retail outlets.

Later products such as the FVRT95 and FVRT90 are single tuner machines (able to record one channel only) and are badged versions of an Access Devices design. These boxes used the standard Freeview EPG data, and not the 14 day "Multiguide".

== "Multiguide" EPG ==
Most Digifusion PVRs were designed to access the proprietary "Multiguide" EPG, originally provided by 4TV Ltd. EPG data is broadcast in the form of an MHEG application on the "4TVInteractive" channel (currently Freeview channel 300) from 3 am, at which time the receiving boxes automatically tune to the channel and cache the EPG. Originally this provided the boxes with a full seven-day EPG at a time when Freeview itself only supported now and next information – but when Freeview later began broadcasting the now standard eight-day guide, the 4TV system was upgraded to support 14-day listings. However, unlike the standard Freeview EPG, this data is not "live" as it is only refreshed overnight, and any scheduling changes on the day are not reflected in the EPG. This also prevents the implementation of any Freeview+ features on Multiguide-based products.

The Multiguide EPG was used by most Digifusion PVRs, the Thomson DHD-4000, the Inverto IDL-7000, and a number of other receivers, but the last new product based on Multiguide was the Sony SVR-S500 launched in 2006. The EPG service is now maintained by Inview Interactive Limited, the company behind Radio Times Extra, but an increased number of failed EPG downloads during the latter half of 2009 caused some speculation over the Multiguide's future.

On 28 June 2010, after another series of failed EPG downloads, InView responded to customer enquiries with the following statement:

"Thank you for your email. Unfortunately we are discontinuing the service as we are no longer able to have access to the delivery method that has been available until now. I know that this is not good news for you so I can only deeply apologise for your loss of service in advance. Your box should otherwise operate normally and have the now and next option."

Unfortunately the transmission of "Multiguide" EPG has ceased permanently, so owners of PVRs that use this technology (including Digifusion) can either record programs manually, or upgrade to PVRs that use the Freeview eight-day EPG.

== Recent products ==
Since Digifusion was bought out by Beko, the brand has not been seen on any new products.

Beko manufactured a PVR called the SVR-S500 on behalf of Sony, and its internal architecture was virtually identical to the Digifusion FVRT200. It also offered a nearly identical feature set and used the same EPG, although it only displayed 8 days of the 14 day listings downloaded.
