= EV6 =

EV6 may refer to:

- EV6 The Rivers Route, a EuroVelo long-distance cycling route
- Kia EV6, a 2021–present South Korean electric compact SUV
- Skyworth EV6, a 2021–present Chinese electric mid-size SUV
- EV6 bus, a microprocessor bus used by some Alpha and AMD CPUs
