= 4TVInteractive =

4TVInteractive was an Electronic Programme Guide (EPG), launched in 2002, for television services in the United Kingdom. The service, which supplied up to 14 days worth of listings data, was available through compatible digital terrestrial television receivers. The service was created by 4TV Limited, before the launch of Freeview's DVB seven-day EPG in 2004, and had been operated by Inview Technology since November 2006.

4TVInteractive was found on channel 300. Data was broadcast overnight (between 03:00 and 04:00) and stored by the receiver. Compatible receivers relied on this data rather than the "live" EPG broadcast on each multiplex. As a result, receivers dependent on 4TV data lack the ability to react to late schedule changes by broadcasters.

During June 2010, InView Technology ceased updating the EPG and confirmed plans to terminate the service, with the final update providing EPG information until 7 July 2010. A representative said that the contract to distribute the updates had ended and therefore had no access to the necessary bandwidth to maintain the service. The companies involved were asked to maintain these services, but were unable to do so. However, they continued to offer advanced EPG information to Radio Times Extra EPG based devices.

The list of affected boxes included: Digifusion FRT101, Digifusion FVRT100, Digifusion FVRT145, Digifusion FVRT150, Digifusion FVRT200, Digifusion FVRT400, Inverto IDL-7000T, Inverto IDL-7000M, Thomson DHD4000 and the Sony SVR-S500. No new devices using the 4TV EPG had shipped for four years prior to the services closure and none of the boxes were authorised to carry the Freeview label.

Digifusion and Sony incorrectly featured the "Digital Tick", the Digital TV Group, which represents the digital TV industry, claims that these products were not entitled to carry the Digital Tick badge, and that they were 'self declared', the Digital TV Group has since tightened the licensing system and no longer allows self-certification.

In July 2010, a petition calling on Freeview to help consumers left without the advance electronic programming guide (EPG) data had attracted over 760 signatures of consumers who didn't want to lose 4TV. In a statement, Freeview said that the situation demonstrates the need for consumers to always purchase Freeview products with Digital Tick. "We have contacted the third party involved to see if a solution can be found."

The Digital TV Group added: "Any product that carries the Digital Tick will have passed the Digital TV Group's rigorous test and conformance regimes. The failure of even a small number of ageing receivers in the market emphasises the need for all manufacturers to co-ordinate their production efforts through the specification and test and conformance procedures of the Digital TV Group to achieve the Digital Tick and Freeview trade mark licence, which are proven indicators that a product is compliant, reliable and robust."

On 2 August 2010, 4TVInteractive was removed from the Freeview EPG on channel 300. Viewers who retune the box will lose/remove the channel from the line-up. Old boxes which people doesn't use it anymore still have "4TVInteractive" on the channel list.

== See also ==
- Digifusion
- Digital TV Group
- Digital terrestrial television in the United Kingdom
- Electronic programme guide
- Freeview (UK)
- Radio Times Extra
