= Integrated access device =

An Integrated Access Device (or IAD) is a customer premises device that provides access to wide area networks and the Internet. Specifically, it aggregates multiple channels of information including voice and data across a single shared access link to a carrier or service provider PoP (Point of Presence). The access link may be a T1 line, a DSL connection, a cable (CATV) network, a broadband wireless link, or a metro-Ethernet connection.

At the PoP, the customer's aggregated information is typically directed into an Add-drop multiplexer or an MSPP (multiservice provisioning platform), which are complex and expensive devices that sit between customers and the core network. They manage traffic streams coming from customers and forward those streams to the PSTN (voice) or appropriate wide area networks (ATM, Frame Relay, or the Internet).

An IAD is sometimes installed by the service provider to which a customer wishes to connect. This allows the service provider to control the features of the access link and manage its operation during use. Competitive service providers are now offering access services over a variety of access technologies, including wireless optical (i.e., Terabeam) and metro-Ethernet networks. Old telco protocols and transport methods (T1 lines and time-division multiplexing) are replaced with access methods that are appropriate for the underlying transport. Because of this, the provider will usually specify an appropriate IAD or install an IAD.

SIAD will aggregate its IP data traffic and GSM ATM traffic at the cellsite passing it along to the multi-service routers sitting in front of mobile switching center (MSC). It will aggregate the cell site traffic and forward to the MSN.

There are other cost saving benefits of moving to an IAD since a Primary Rate Interface which is typically required for (PBX) equipment requires 23 voice (bearer) channels and 1 signaling (data) channel. By purchasing an IAD instead and connecting to a VoIP service provider, customers can purchase only the number of voice channels that are actually required at their location. Since the VoIP service allows internet access to be used for both voice and data, moving to a VoIP solution allows customers to remove the local access charges associated with the T1 local loop that was required to deliver the legacy PRI service. This allows customers to realize a significant cost savings by removing unused voice channels and access costs. Some companies estimate a 30%–75% cost savings can be realized by moving to VoIP.

Another benefit in moving to a VoIP solution over TDM is that additional security can be added to the voice service since Multiprotocol Label Switching connections can be used for voice access. This is especially important in the legal and healthcare industry where confidential information is routinely shared during phone calls.

The only caveats to sharing Voice and data on the same connection are that proper Quality of service must be added to the circuit to ensure that the voice traffic takes priority over the data traffic and that enough bandwidth is available for the number of sessions (AKA concurrent call paths, channels, etc..) of voice service that are needed at the site. A good rule of thumb (and to make for easy math) for a home phone quality (G.711) VoIP codec is to assume 100 kbit/s per session multiplied by the number of sessions required at the location. For example 10 sessions of VoIP would require 1 Mbit/s of available bandwidth and 1 Mbit/s of premium QOS to ensure a quality call experience.
