= Kaon Media =

South Korean technology company

Kaon Media (Korean: 가온미디어) is a South Korean technology company, which specialises in the development and manufacturing of digital connectivity devices (including set-top boxes) and residential gateways for pay-TV operator, broadband operators and telcos.

Gaon Group is the No. 1 company in the AI-related terminal market share in Korea, and developed and launched the world's first Android-based terminal, 4K IPTV, and AI terminal. It has a network of 150 broadcasting and telecommunications operators in 90 countries around the world, and is a global company with exports accounting for 70~80% of its total performance. It has subsidiary Gaon Broadband, a company specializing in network solutions, and K-Future Tech, an XR and robot solution company.

== History ==
The company is based in Seongnam city, South Korea and was founded in 2001. It provides digital broadcasting services to more than 120 operators in 80 countries.

In November 2013, KAONMEDIA announced that it has started to provide Android set-top boxes, with the latest Google services for TV, on South Korean broadband; this is the world's first commercial launch of IPTV with the latest Android OS (Jellybean 4.2).

In February 2021, the company partnered with Minim and Irdeto to preintegrate their Trusted Home solution into its cable gateway.

== See also ==
- Quickplay Media
