= Skyworth =

Hong Kong-registered Chinese electronics company and OEM

Skyworth Group Co., Ltd. 创维集团有限公司
- Company type: Public (SEHK: 751, SZSE: 000810)
- Industry: Electronics
- Founded: 1988; 38 years ago
- Founder: Huang Hongsheng, Stephen Wong
- Headquarters: Nanshan, Shenzhen, Guangdong, China
- Area served: Worldwide
- Key people: Zhang Xuebin, CEO, Executive Director
- Products: Set-top boxes, televisions, A/V security products, mobile phones, auto electronics, electric vehicles, and precision dies
- Services: IT services
- Website: www.skyworth.com

Skyworth logo until 2018

Skyworth (simplified Chinese: 创维; traditional Chinese: 創維; pinyin: chuāngwéi), officially Skyworth Group Co., Ltd., is a Chinese holding company. Its subsidiaries design, manufacture and sell televisions and other audio-visual products. They also invest in properties. Headquartered in Nanshan High-tech Park, Shenzhen, as of 2010, Skyworth has operations in Hong Kong and Inner Mongolia as well as in various locations in Guangdong including Shenzhen, Guangzhou, and Dongguan.

The company refers to itself as an "industry cluster", but it may serve as an anchor for multiple integrated industrial-base sites. Skyworth is a member of the Chinese consortium that developed the Enhanced Versatile Disc. It is also an OEM, making televisions that retail under brand names other than its own.

The automotive marque called "Skyworth" corresponds to Skyworth Auto.

== History ==
Skyworth was established in 1988 in Shenzhen. In 1992 Skyworth Group established its headquarters in Hong Kong.

In 2003 the head office of the group was moved into the newly built Skyworth Building.

From 1996 to 2000 is termed by the company its "fast growth period", during which it was the number four, in term of production volume, television manufacturing company in China. This period of growth culminated with an IPO on the Hong Kong Stock Exchange in April 2000.

After 2000, Skyworth experienced problems resulting from such quick expansion. It shuttered a small appliances unit and sold to creditors an 80% equity stake in its newly minted mobile phone subsidiary for a nominal sum.

== Products ==
The company's core products, televisions and set-top boxes, are complemented by a variety of other products and services including leasing itself property and major appliances.

SKYWORTH has five different TV series targeting different audience segments: W, S, Q, G and A series.

W stands for "Wonder". The latest products include the SKYWORTH W82, the first mass-produced transformable TV, and the SKYWORTH W92, an 88-inch 8K OLED TV, launched in March 2021.

S stands for "Supreme". The latest product is the SKYWORTH S82, a 4K OLED TV, launched in September 2021.

The Q series presents "Quality" products. The latest product is the SKYWORTH Q72, a 4K SmartMiniLED TV, launched in September 2021.

The G Series stands for "General". The latest product is the SKYWORTH G90, a 4K OLED gaming monitor, launched in September 2021.

A stands for "Ablaze". The latest product is the SKYWORTH A20 Pro, a 4K 120 Hz flicker-free TV, launched in September 2021.

== Operations ==
=== Subsidiaries ===
Skyworth has many wholly owned subsidiaries and is a partner in many joint ventures.

Below is an incomplete list.

Skyworth USA Corporation

In June 2014 Skyworth, South Africa was established

In 2017, Skyworth opened its first American corporate branch office in California, Skyworth USA Corporation.

Shenzhen Coocaa Network Technology Co Ltd

A joint venture with Netac Technology, Shenzhen Coocaa Network Technology Co Ltd provides free high-definition movie and video download services. Its first product was a television that can play video from special USB flash drives.

Shenzhen Skyworth Automobile Electronics Co Ltd

A manufacturer of in-car AV electronics, it is incorporated in the British Virgin Islands.

Shenzhen Skyworth Digital Technology Co Ltd

The second biggest subsidiary of Skyworth Group Co Ltd, its focus is on set-top boxes. It was created from the union of Skyworth Bandwidth Co Ltd and a Skyworth R&D team. It also has made Enhanced Versatile Disc players. Located in the Nanshan District of Shenzhen, it operates two factories in the city, one of which is in Shiyan county in the Bao'an District of Shenzhen, most probably at the Skyworth high-tech industrial park in Tangtou village. Skyworth Digital Technology's R&D wing is also located in the Nanshan District of Shenzhen.

Shenzhen Skyworth-RGB Electronics Co Ltd

Skyworth Group co-established Shenzhen Skyworth-RGB Electronic Co Ltd with China Shenzhen Television Company or China Shenzhen Color TV Company and either China National Electronic Devices Company or China Electronic Component Industry Company in 1993.

Skyworth Marco Commercial Offshore Co Ltd

Skyworth Marco Commercial Offshore Co Ltd is a wholly owned subsidiary invested by Skyworth in November, 2000, and tasked with the research and development, production, sale and distribution of TV and AV products for the overseas market. It is a Chinese OEM/ODM with operations in Shenzhen and Inner Mongolia.

Skyworth Mobile Communication (Shenzhen) Ltd

Established in 2003, it manufacturers mobile phones. Due to losses and the amount of debt it had taken on, 80% of ownership in Skyworth Mobile was sold for the nominal cost of one yuan and one Hong Kong Dollar to creditors Shenzhen Baoyi and Shine Success in 2008 with the understanding that they would inject more cash into the enterprise.

Skyworth Precision Technology Co Ltd

Located in the Skyworth high-tech industrial park the Tangtou village of Shiyan County, Bao'an District, Shenzhen, Skyworth Precision Technology Co Ltd manufactures moulds for use in the injection molding of parts for household appliances, automobile components, televisions, etc.

Skyworth TTG Holdings Ltd

Formed in 2008 with Tripod Technology Group Inc, an IT services company, Skyworth TTG provides IT services to companies.

As of 2008, it had locations in the US, China, Norway, and Singapore.

It helped Telenor put in place several Oracle identity management systems in 2010.

Skyworth Qunxin Security and Protection Technology Co Ltd

A manufacturer of AV security products, including CRT CCTVs and CCD cameras, it was established in 2000 or 2001 and is located in Bagualing, Futian District, Shenzhen.

Other

Other subsidiaries include: Skyworth Multimedia (Shenzhen) Co Ltd, Skyworth Photoelectric Science & Technology Co Ltd, Shenzhen Display Technology Co Ltd, Skyworth Application Electronics Co Ltd, Skyworth LCD Technology Co Ltd, Skyworth Die Plant, Skyworth Semiconductors Company, and Shenzhen Skyworth Qunxin and Fang Technology Co Ltd.

=== Production bases and facilities ===
Skyworth has a number of production facilities. Television productions bases are located at the New Guangming District of Shenzhen, in the Hohhot Economic Development Area of Inner Mongolia, at a flat display industrial park in the Shiyan county of the Bao'an District, Shenzhen, and at the Guangzhou Economic and Technology Development Zone in Guangzhou.

The company also has logistic centers in Shuangliu, Chengdu; Yichun, Jiangxi; and Lishui, Nanjing.

Another Skyworth-owned site is the Skyworth High-Tech Industrial Park, located in the Tangtou village of Shiyan County, Bao'an District, Shenzhen.

Skyworth overseas locations include offices in Mexico, Russia, and the United States. Shenzhen is also site for R&D efforts.

== Partners ==
In 2014 their partners included: Inview Technology Ltd, a UK based company specialising in advanced EPGs for digital TV. Skyworth announced that they will be offering operators a number of Inview's services including advertising, Push-VOD and multiscreen. Inview has also developed the software platform for Skyworth's HDMI dongle that allows users to view content such as VOD, live streamed channels and social networking apps on any television, controlled by their mobile phones. The TV provides the content and the mobile device provides gesture input.
