= Radio Times Extra =

British digital EPG provided by Inview Technology

Radio Times Extra is a means of extending advertising into the medium of digital programme guides provided by Inview Technology. It offers full television listings and synopses forward 14 days, as well as editorialised selections include 'pick of the day'.

== History ==
Radio Times Extra has been installed on certain Freeview box models through an 'over-air download', but some makers installing the service on new boxes that can be bought in the shops. As of January 2011, Radio Times Extra has been installed on 3.8 million Freeview set-top boxes in the United Kingdom from 21 different manufacturers spanning 37 receivers.

The service was originally built by Teletext Ltd in collaboration with Inview Technology. In a deal between BBC Worldwide and Inview Technology, Teletext Extra was relaunched as Radio Times Extra on 31 January 2011, with editorial content from the Radio Times.

== Usage ==
Radio Times Extra provides users with an Electronic Programme Guide (EPG) carrying 14 days of television listings including programme information. You can access the EPG from any Freeview channel by going to your digital remote control and pressing the 'TV Guide' button, when using a Radio Times Extra-compatible Freeview receiver. A small window on the EPG continues to display video from the channel you were on.

If you press the 'Text' button on your digital remote while viewing the EPG, you are taken to a digital teletext service with information such as news, sport, racing, travel, weather, entertainment and holidays. Teletext Extra had more content than Teletext Ltd's digital services on ITV and Channel 4 and carried high-resolution images with top stories.

== Criticism ==
The software has been installed on some set-top boxes which did not originally include it, by over-the-air updates without the consent of the owners allow the software to be disabled. However, the software disrupts the proper functioning of some older set-top boxes even when disabled. From the set-top box owners viewpoint therefore Radio Times Extra has similar characteristics to unwanted spam and computer viruses.

== See also ==
- Television in the United Kingdom
- Digital television in the United Kingdom
- 4TVInteractive
- Ceefax
- ORACLE
- Teletext
