= Skyworth EV6 =

Chinese electric compact crossover SUV

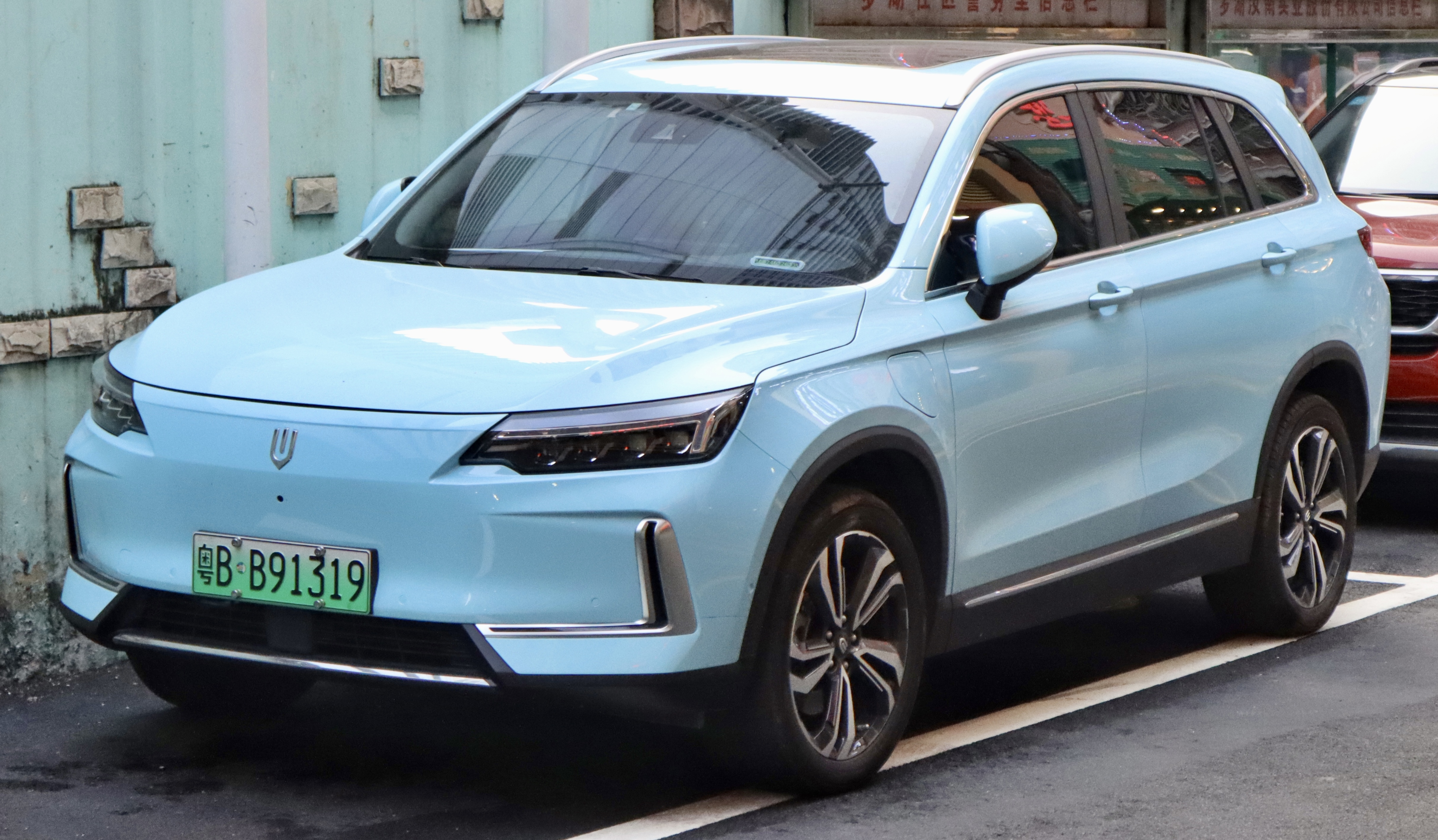
- Skyworth EV6 (Skywell ET5) front

Overview
- Manufacturer: Skyworth Auto
- Also called: Skywell ET5 (Poland, Romania, Israel and Iran); Skywell BE11 (UK); Elaris Beo (Germany); Imperium SEV (North America); Fregata Ariel 8 (Thailand); Nebka ET5 (Iran); Polytron G3/G3+ (Indonesia)
- Production: 2021–present
- Assembly: China: Nanjing; Indonesia: Purwakarta, West Java (HIM)

Body and chassis
- Class: Compact crossover SUV
- Body style: 5-door SUV
- Layout: Front-motor, Front-wheel drive (EV); Front-engine, front motor, Front-wheel drive (PHEV)

Powertrain
- Engine: 1.5L DFSK F31A I4
- Electric motor: 150 kW (204 PS; 201 hp) electric motor (EV); 130 kW (177 PS; 174 hp) electric motor (PHEV)
- Transmission: 1-speed direct drive
- Hybrid drivetrain: PHEV (Skyworth HT-i)
- Battery: PHEV; 21.68 or 32.76 kWh lithium; EV; 55 kWh lithium (base model) 72 kWh lithium (upper-level models) 86 kWh (2023 model year); 55.33 or 57.51 kWh (420 km. Spec); 71.98 kWh (520 km. Spec)
- Electric range: 410 km (255 mi) NEDC (55 kWh); 400 km (249 mi) WLTP; 520 km (323 mi) NEDC (72 kWh); 489 km (304 mi) WLTP; 620 km (385 mi) CLTC (86 kWh)

Dimensions
- Wheelbase: 2,800 mm (110.2 in)
- Length: 4,698 mm (185.0 in)
- Width: 1,908 mm (75.1 in)
- Height: 1,696 mm (66.8 in)
- Curb weight: 1,920 kg (4,233 lb)

The Skyworth EV6 (introduced as Skywell ET5) is an electric compact crossover SUV produced since 2021 by Chinese automotive company Skyworth Auto, a joint venture by bus manufacturer Skywell Group and consumer electronics manufacturer Skyworth Group. The PHEV variant is called the Skyworth HT-i.

== Variants ==
=== EV (ET5/EV6/BE11; 2021) ===
The Skyworth EV6 was revealed in China in October 2020 as the Skywell ET5, until the brand's renaming in April 2021, and launched in July 2021. Despite the name change in the domestic Chinese market, car holds the initial Skywell ET5 nameplate in Israel from October 2021, in Romania from December 2021 and in Poland from April 2022. The reason of this policy determines the will in order to avoid confuse of nameplate with the Kia EV6.

In May 2024 it was announced that the Skyworth marque would be sold in the UK by Innovation Automotive with the BE11 being the first model and a choice of 72kWh or 86kWh battery.

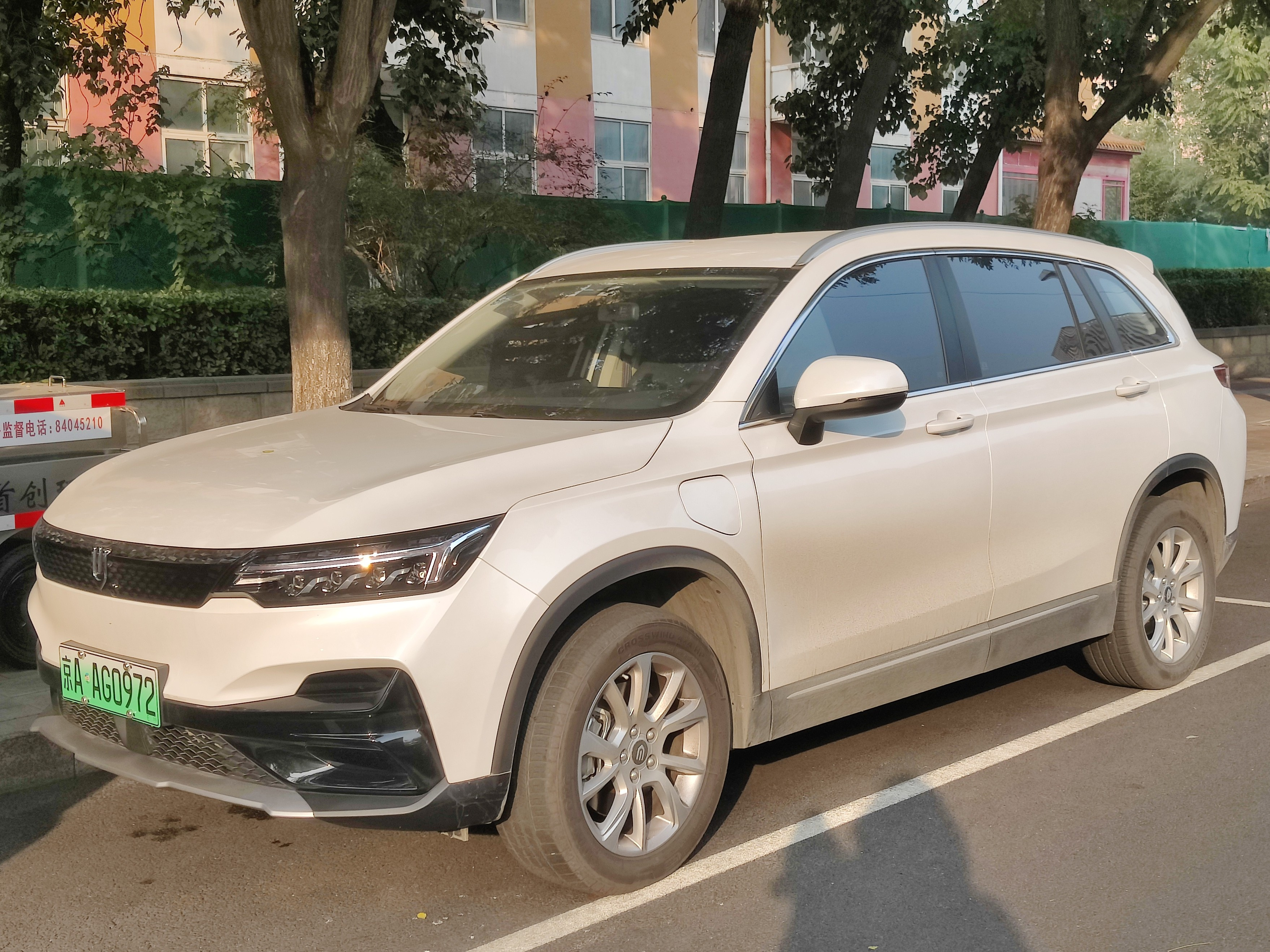
Original Skywell ET5 front

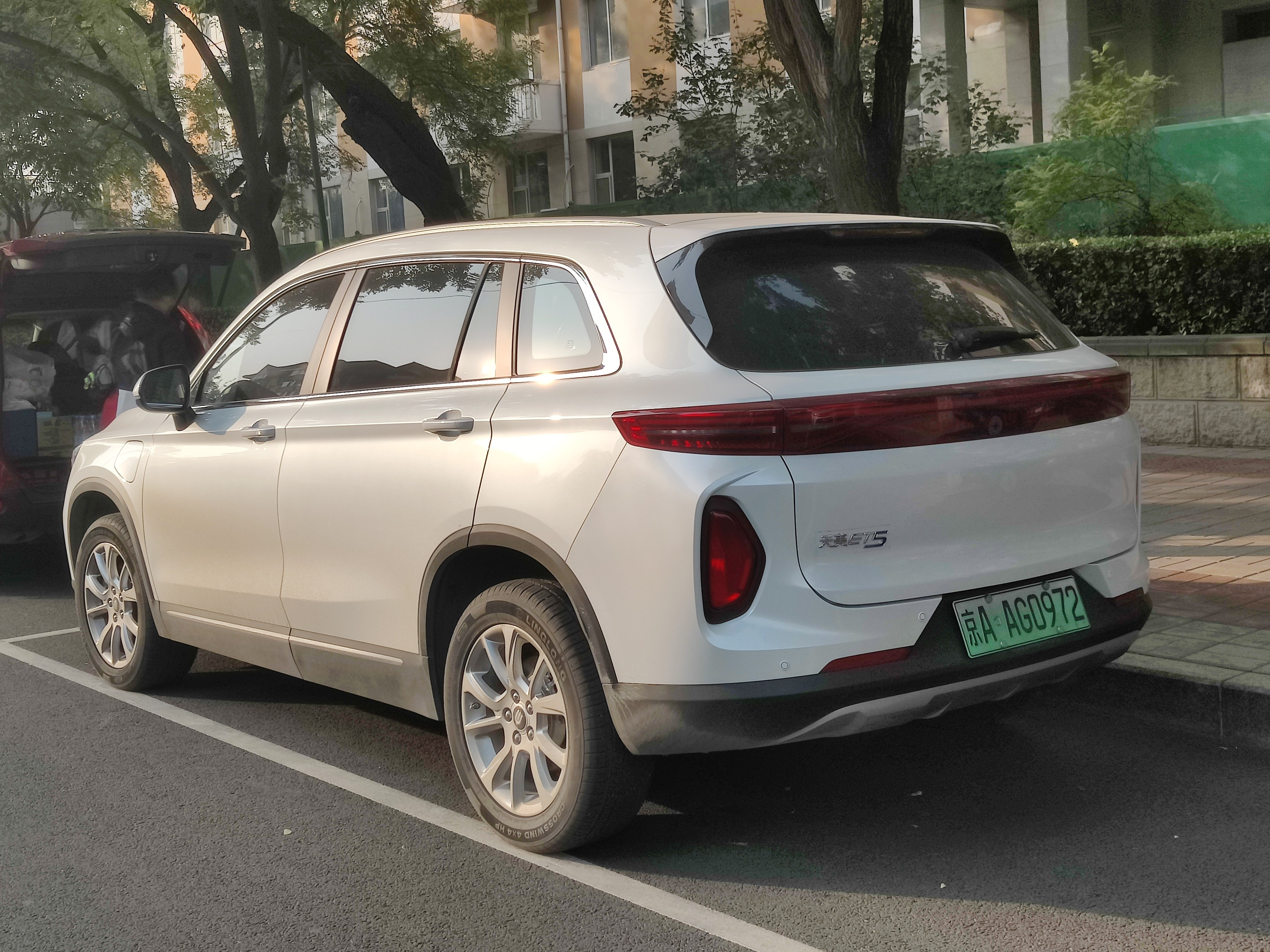
Original Skywell ET5 rear

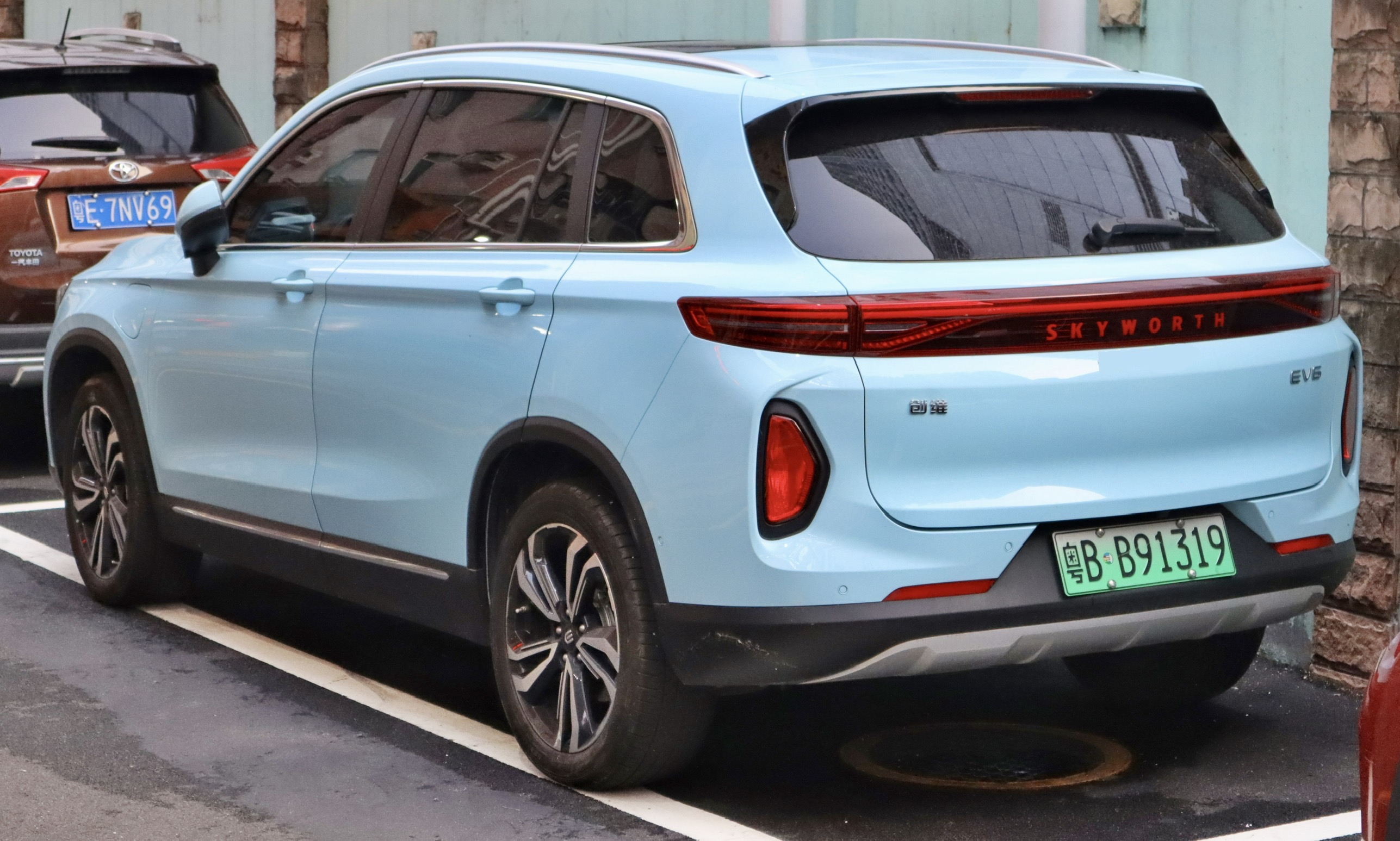
Name change and post-facelift Skyworth EV6

=== PHEV (HT-i; 2022) ===
Launched in September 2022, the Skyworth HT-i is the plug-in hybrid variant of the EV6.

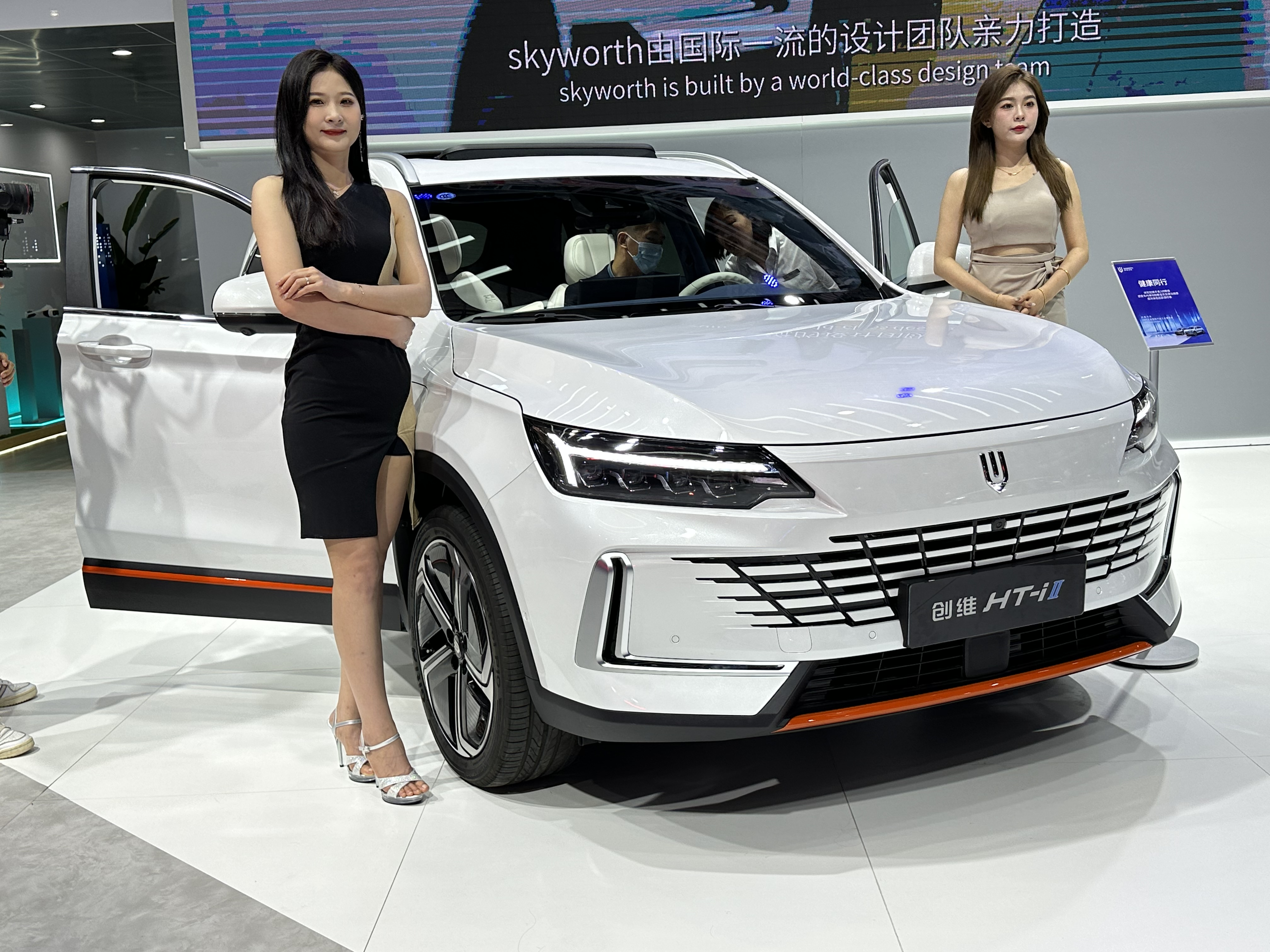
Skyworth HT-i

== Specifications ==
=== Interior ===
The interior of the EV6 features a 12.8-inch touchscreen and is equipped with the Skylink intelligent network connection system by Skyworth Group's Skyworth Technology subsidiary. The infotainment system is developed by Skyworth inhouse.

=== Powertrain ===
==== EV ====
The base Skyworth EV6 has a 55 kWh lithium battery while higher trim models have 72 kWh. In some markets, 72 kWh is the base configuration with an optional 86 kWh pack with the 2023 model year. All models have a peak power output of the front motor of 150 kW (204 hp). Range varies from 410 km (255 mi) (CLTC/NEDC) to 620 km (385 mi), depending on battery size and test cycle. Total battery charging time is stated as 9 hours for the smaller battery and 11 hours for the 72 kWh pack with a 6.6 kW charger. With an optional 3-phase charger (11 kW), these times are reduced. All variants have a 0–100 km/h (62 mph) acceleration time of 7.9 seconds. A 88 kWh battery was announced as a further option that increases range to 600 km (373 mi).

==== HT-i ====
The hybrid powertrain is the DM-i hybrid system by BYD consisting of an electric motor and a 1.5-litre naturally aspirated engine producing a maximum power of 81 kW and a peak torque of 135Nm. The engine has a thermal efficiency of 43.04%. The HT-i is available with two battery pack options. The 21.68kWh capacity battery pack can support up to 115 km of pure electric cruising range, while a larger 32.76kWh capacity battery pack supports 205 km of pure electric cruising range. The Skyworth HT-i's 30-80% battery fast charging time is 25 to 30 minutes, and the slow charging time is 1.6 to 3 hours. The maximum combined overall range is 1267 km and the fuel consumption is 5.85 to 6.1L/100 km.

== Rebadged versions ==
=== Elaris Beo ===
In May 2021, German company Elaris launched the Skyworth EV6 as the Elaris Beo.

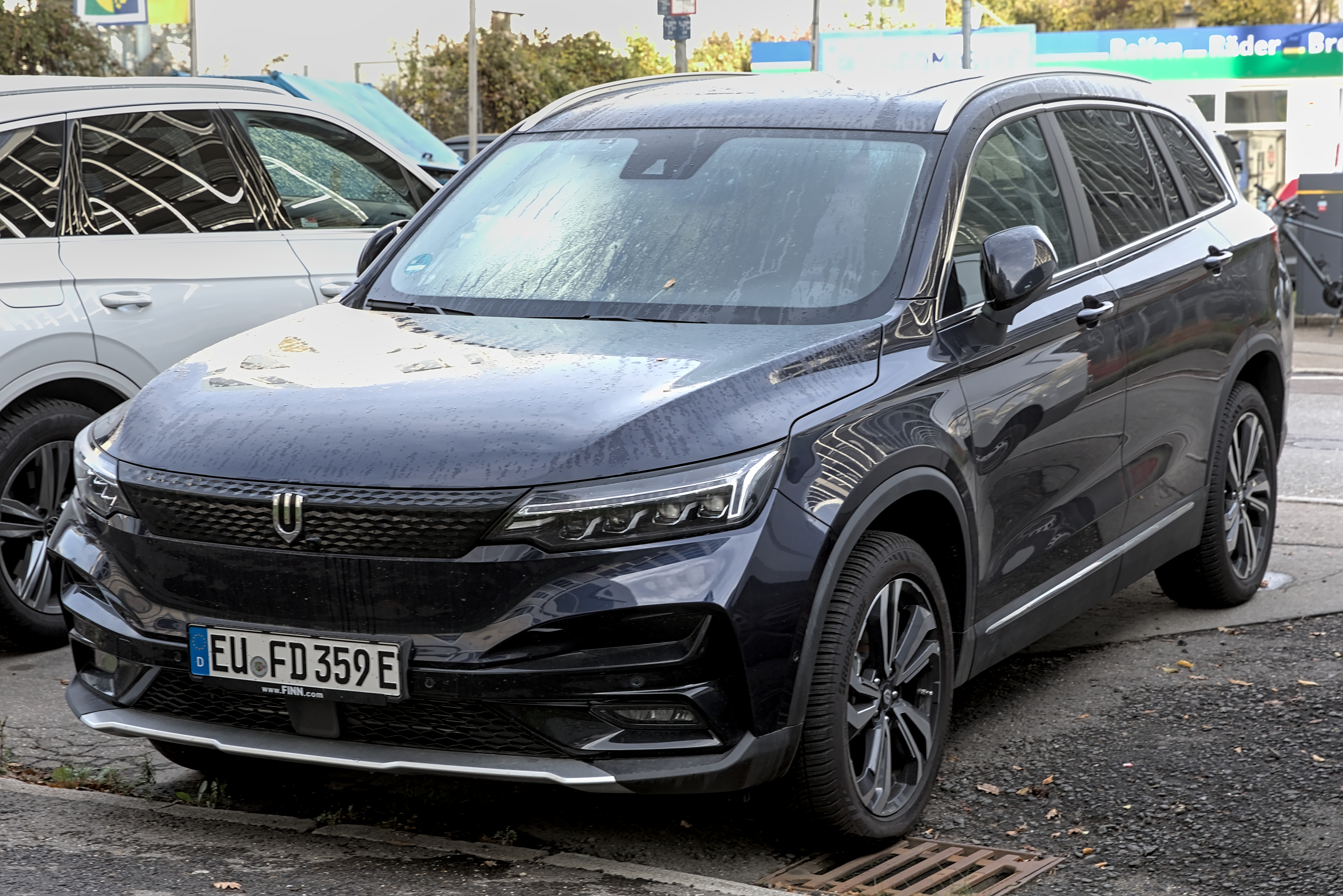
Elaris Beo

=== Imperium SEV ===
Later on in June 2021, it was announced that the Skyworth EV6 will be sold in the United States and Canada by California-based company Imperium Motors as the Imperium SEV. However, a launch date was not announced.

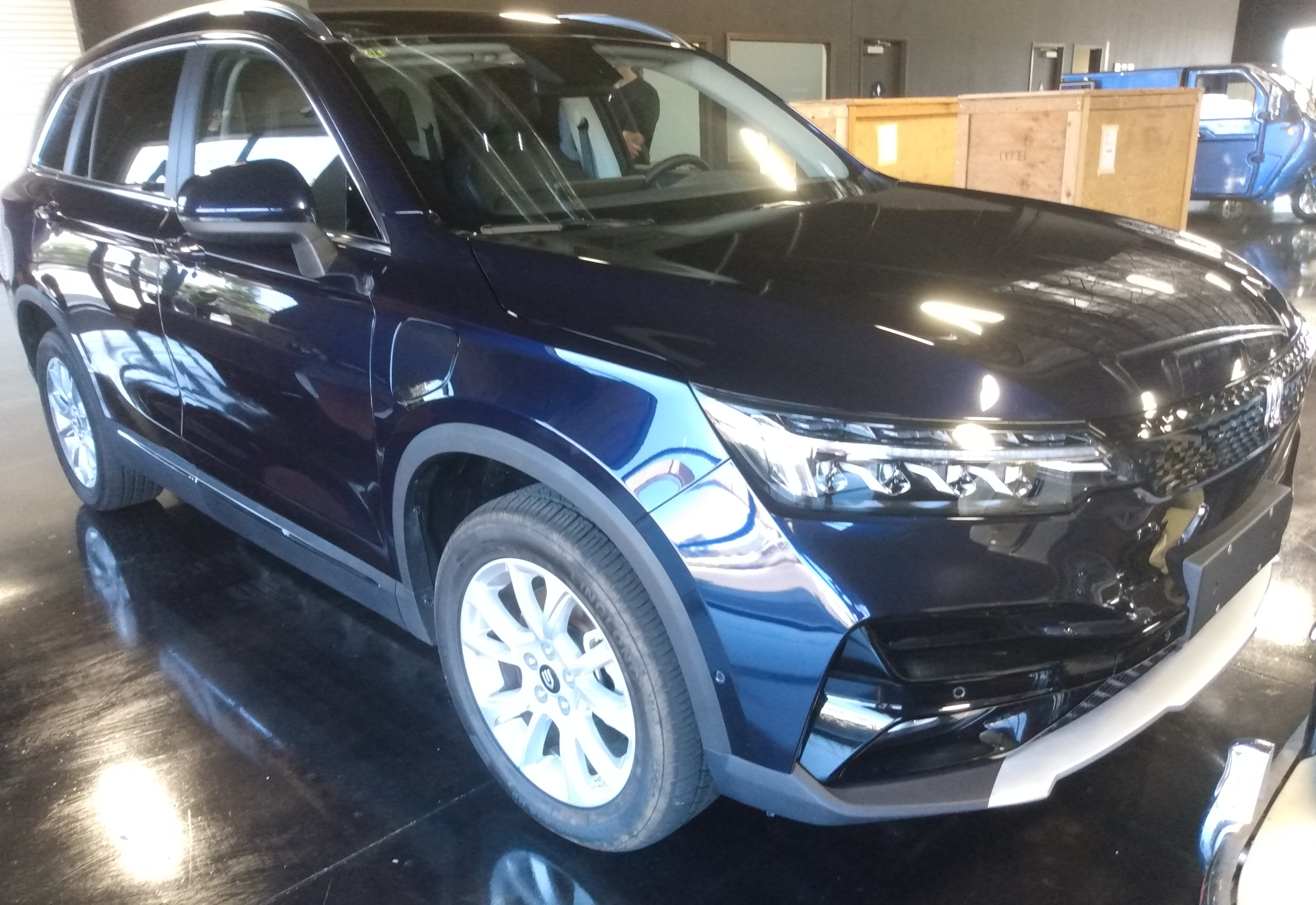
Imperium ET5 at the Imperium Motors Experience Center in Fairfield, California

=== Polytron G3/G3+ ===
On 6 May 2025, the Indonesia-based company Polytron launched the Skyworth EV6 into the market as the Polytron G3. The all-electric Polytron G3 adopts the exterior design of the PHEV Skyworth HT-i. It is available in two variants: G3 and G3+ (the G3+ is equipped with faster charging capability, larger wheels, and a panoramic sunroof), as well as two different ownership schemes: Battery as a Service (BaaS) or Buy to Own (BtO). It is powered by a 52 kWh battery with an estimated range of 402 km.

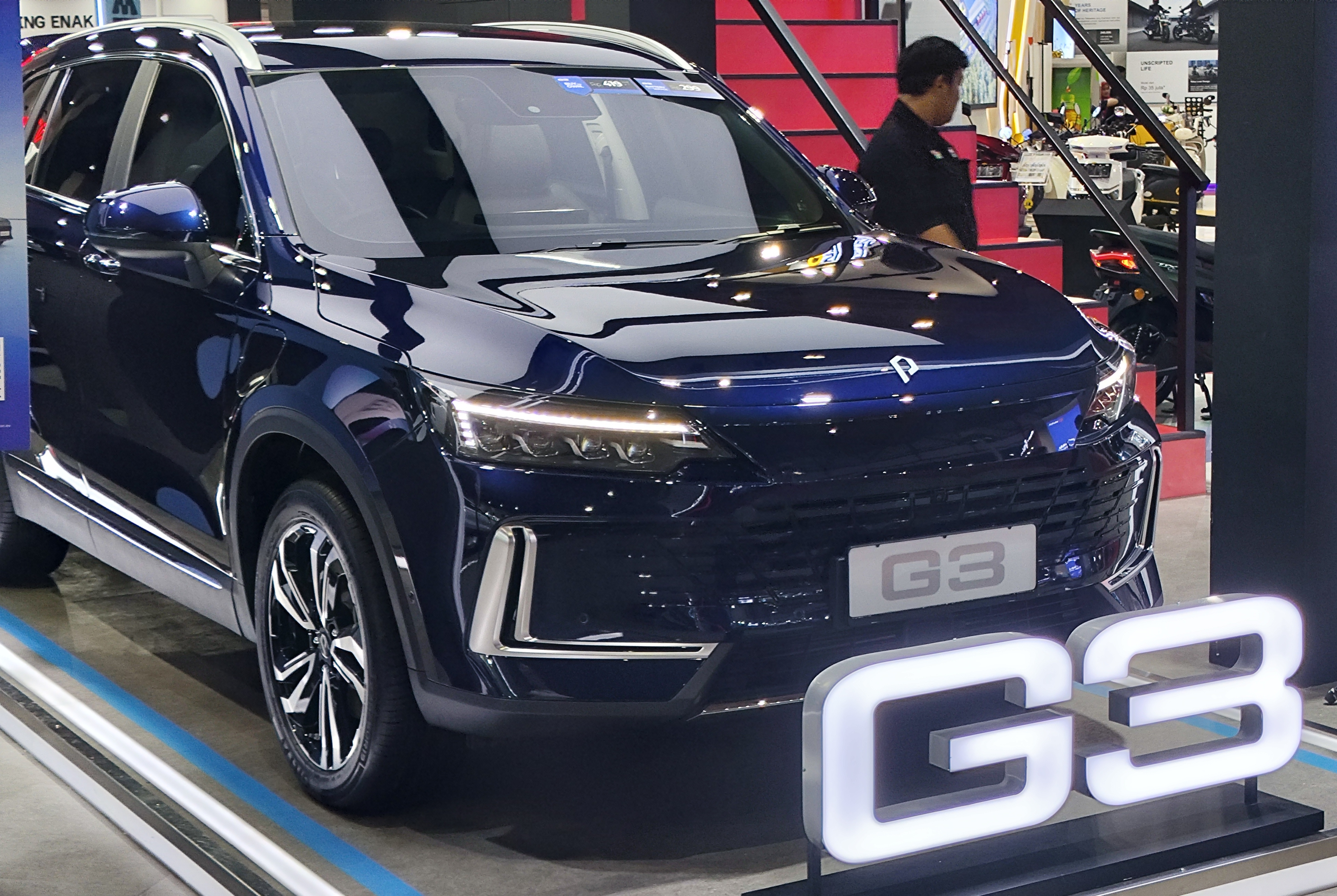
Polytron G3

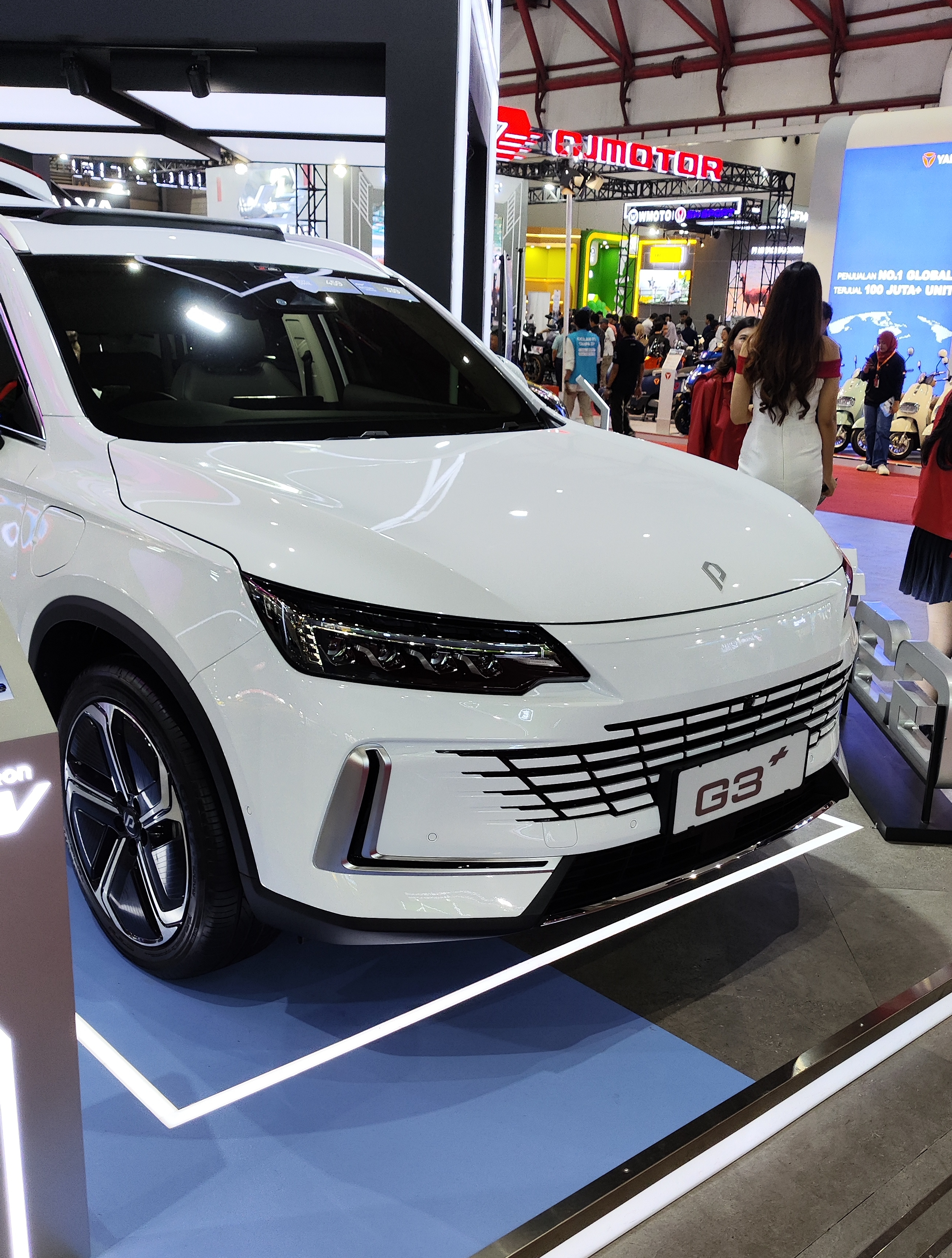
Polytron G3+ (Front)

Polytron G3+ (Rear)

== Sales ==
Year	China			Indonesia		Total production	
Year	EV6	HT-i	ET5	G3	G3+	EV6	HT-i
2023	4,107	3,711	—			14,142	11,105
2024	1,508	3,380	1,606			4,650	5,527
2025	—	1,047	1,581	173	282	3,013	608
