= Skyworth Auto =

Chinese electric vehicle manufacturer

- Type: Subsidiary
- Industry: Automotive
- Founded: 2017; 9 years ago
- Headquarters: Nanjing, China
- Area served: Worldwide
- Key people: Huang Hongsheng (Chairman)
- Products: Electric Vehicles
- Owner: Nanjing Golden Dragon Bus
- Parent: Skywell New Energy Automobile Group
- Website: Official Website - English

Skyworth Auto is a Chinese manufacturer of electric passenger vehicles based in Nanjing, and operating since 2017. The brand belongs to Chinese company Skywell, in partnership with Skyworth Group.

== History ==
=== Skywell New Energy ===
In 2017, Skywell, owner of Nanjing Golden Dragon Bus, announced an expansion into passenger vehicles. 'Skywell New Energy' was created with this goal as a subsidiary.

In the same year, development work began on the first electric car at the research and development center in Nanjing.

In 2020, Skywell's electric car development division officially introduced the Skywell ET5 as its first vehicle, to be manufactured by Tianmei Automobile.

=== Skyworth Auto ===
In April 2021, the division was renamed Skyworth Auto to distinguish it from parent Skywell. Initially, the name change did not include the Skywell ET5 itself, however in July 2021 the vehicle itself received both a new marque and destination, as the Skyworth EV6.

In 2021, German company Elaris announced it would be distributing the EV6 locally as the Elaris Beo.

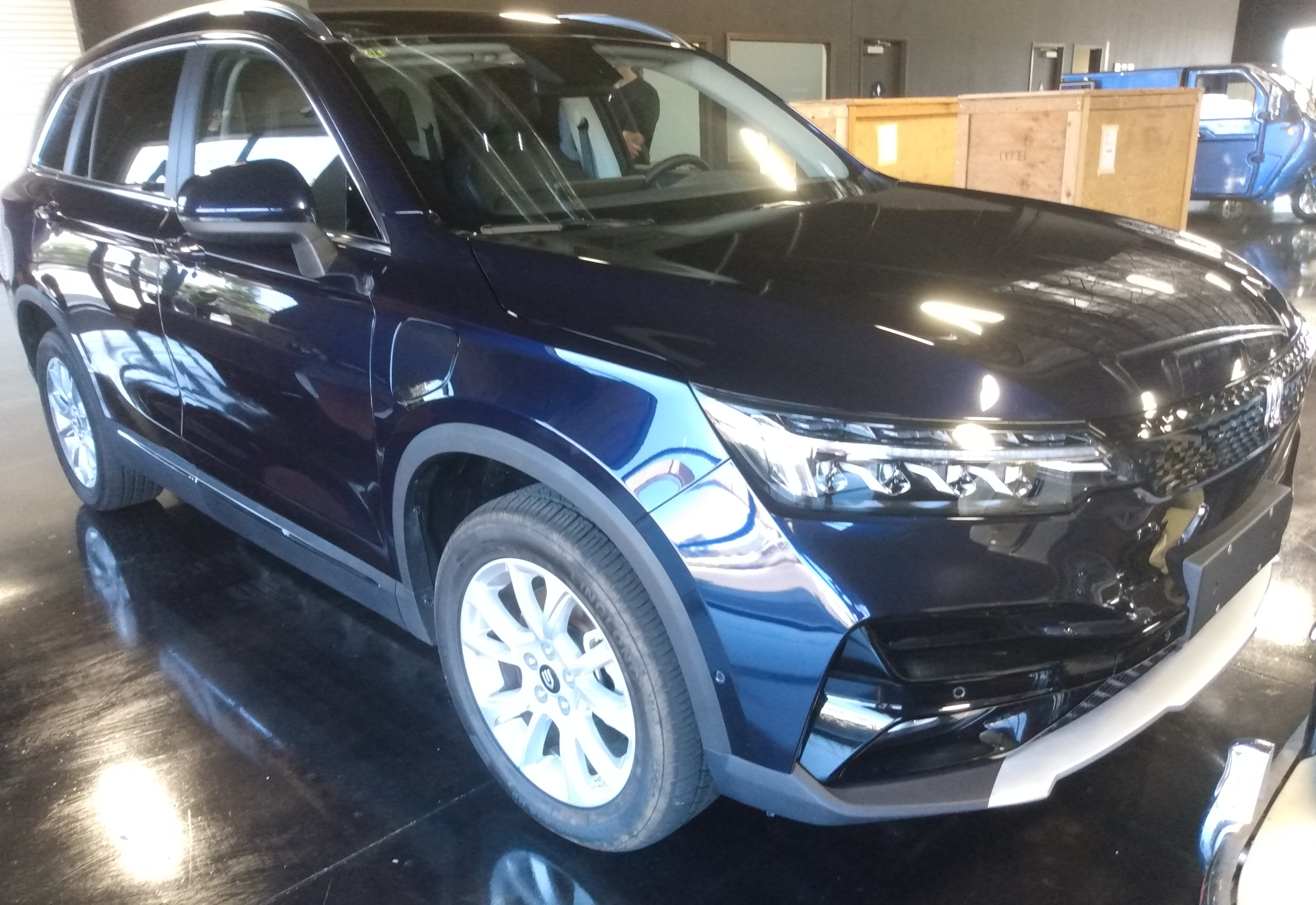
Skyworth EV6, badged as an Imperium ET5

Imperium Motors also announced it would be bringing the EV6 to the US and Canada the same year, as the ET5 Imperium.

In November 2023, during the Guangzhou Auto Show, Skyworth presented the first teaser of the expansion of the company's range with another model in the form of a prototype of the flagship Shyhome electric limousine.

== Products ==
=== Current ===
- Skyworth EV6 (previously Skywell ET5)
- Skyworth HT-i
- Skyworth Q
- Skyworth Skyhome - 57 inch screen
- Skyworth Panshi
- Skyworth Summer
- Skyworth Hongtu (battery-electric panel van)
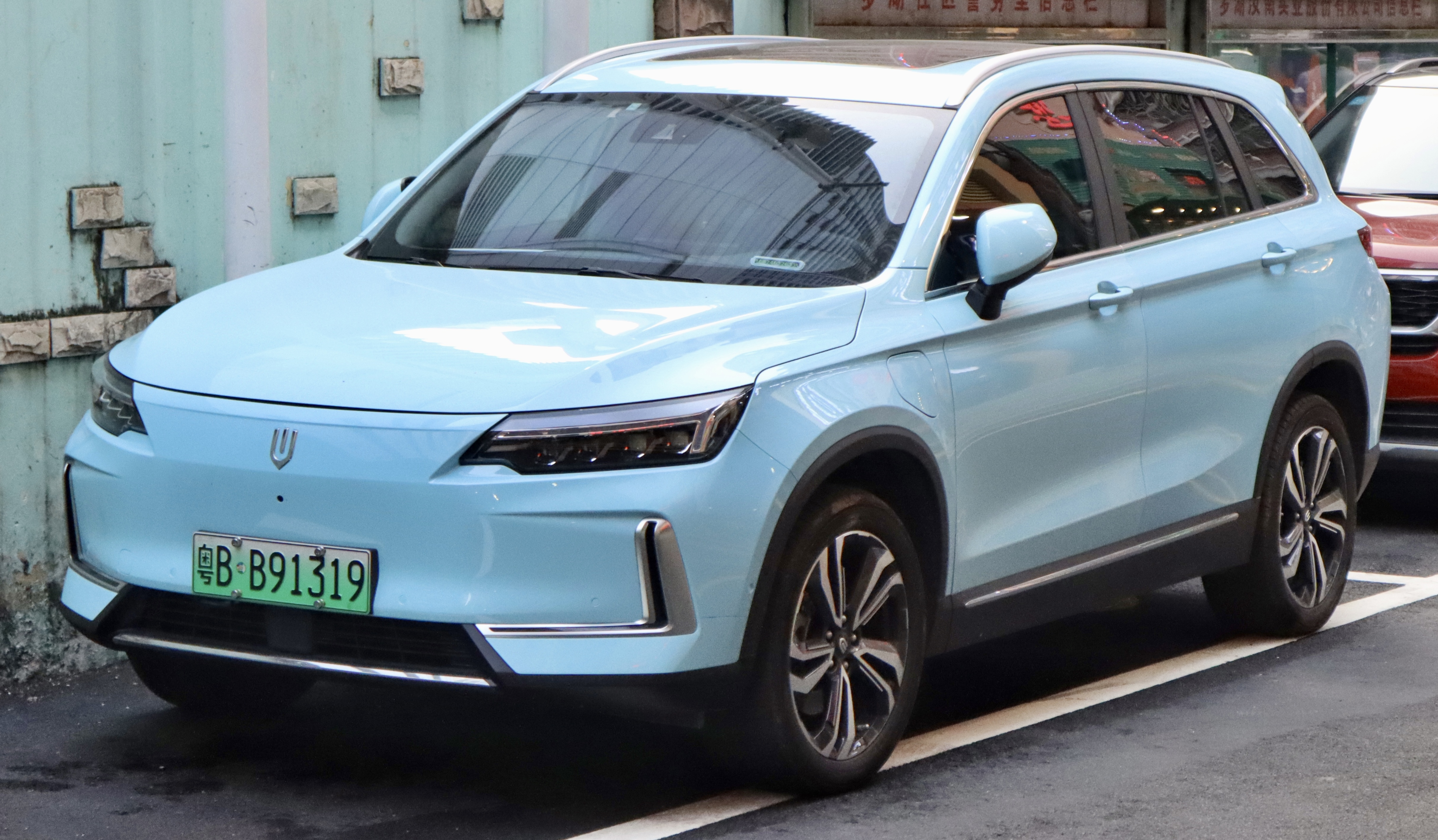
Skyworth EV6

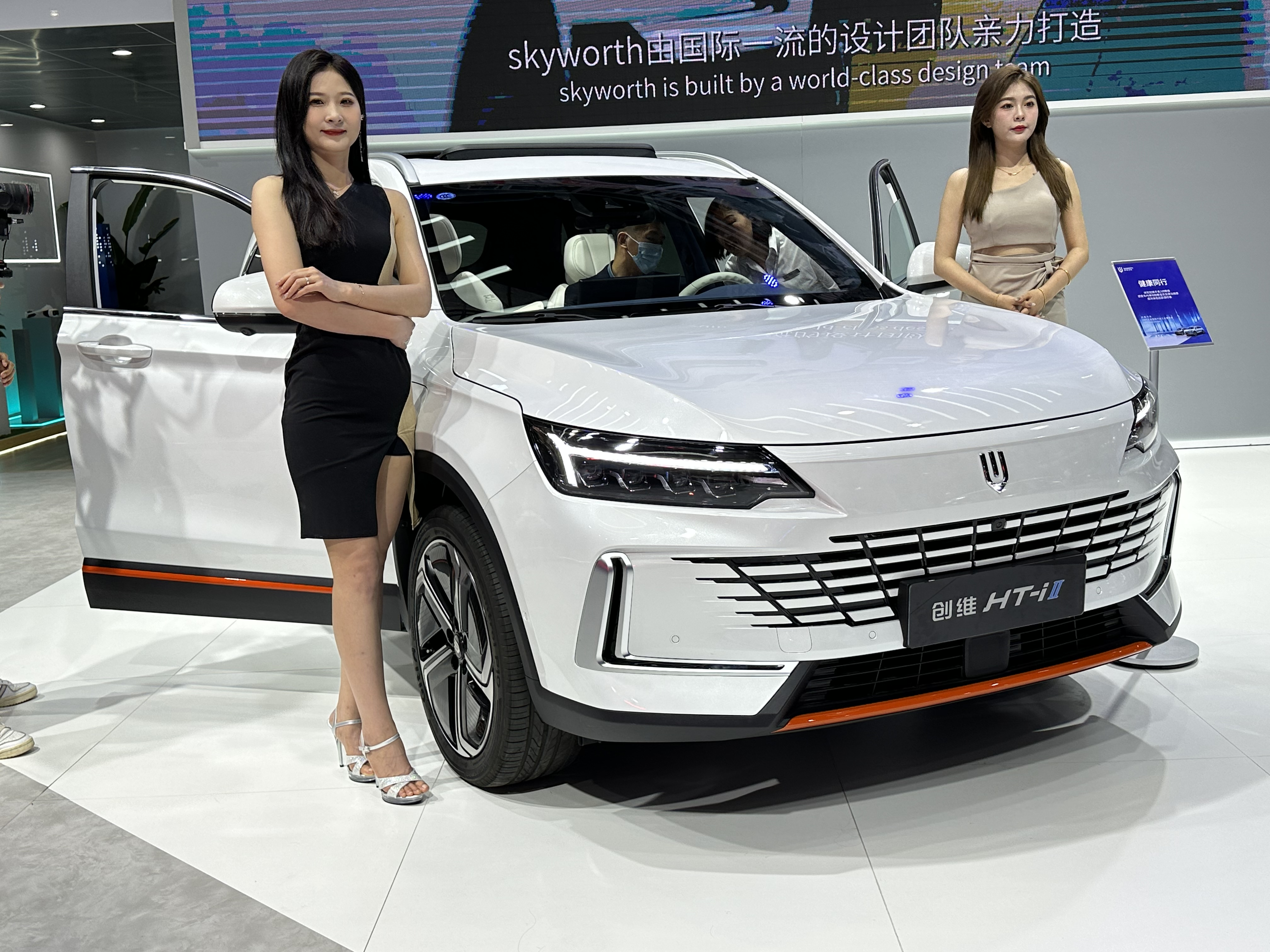
Skyworth HT-i

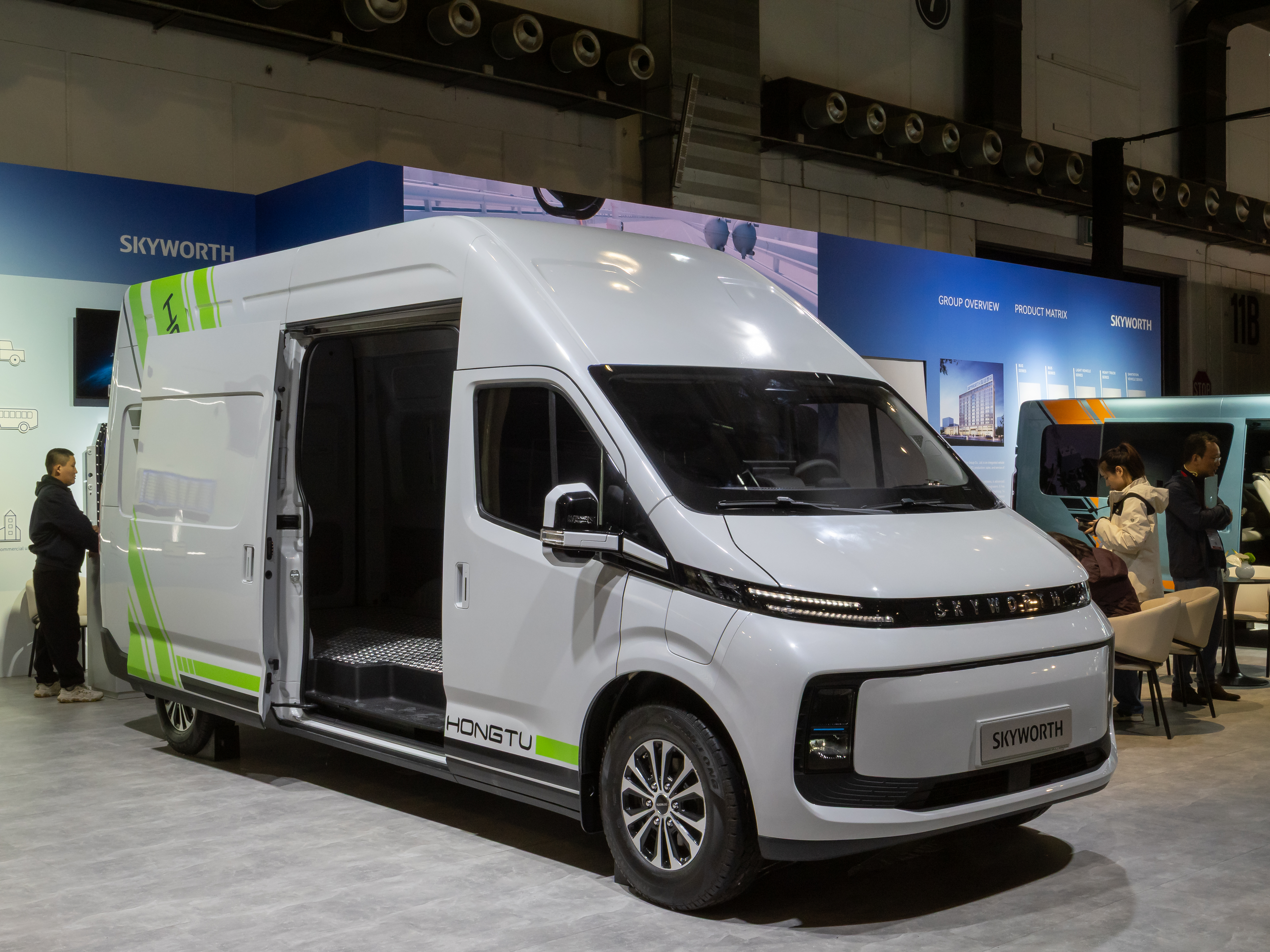
Skyworth Hongtu

== Sales ==
Skyworth Auto sales
Year	Sales
2021	4,088
2022	21,916
2023	29,701
