= Ken Austin (inventor) =

British inventor and technologist

Ken Austin is an inventor, technologist and chairman of Inview Technology Ltd. His company, based in Northwich, Cheshire, UK is privately owned. Between 1986 and 1996 he was Technical Director and Vice Chairman of Pilkington Micro-elec Ltd.

Self-taught in electronics, and was the first to secure patents for digital television programme guides during the early 1990s.

He also featured in the book Organising Genius by Paul Thorne (ISBN 978-0631169598).

In 2011 video on demand (VOD) company OnDemand teamed up with Inview Technology to launch video-on-demand (TVOD, SVOD) services on connected TVs.
