= Cable-ready =

Television device that is capable of receiving cable TV

Cable-ready is a designation which indicates that a TV set or other television-receiving device (such as a VCR or DVR) is capable of receiving cable TV without a set-top box.

The term originated with analog TV, which uses different frequencies for cable versus over-the-air. This gives more channels, and at lower frequencies, so that early systems did not have to be so broadband and were therefore less expensive to build.

For North American cable television frequencies, the VHF channels 2 to 13 are the same, while an extra 51 cable channels exist between there and over-the-air UHF channel 14. Thus, over-the-air channel 14 can be seen on cable channel 65. Conversely, those 51 extra channels (plus an additional five inserted at 95 to 99) cannot be seen at all on a device which is not cable-ready. A "181-channel tuner" receives 125 on cable (1 to 125), plus 10 (126 to 135) more for digital cable ready TVs, plus the 56 (14 to 69) which are not identical in both (2 to 13). Other cable channels, 0, 00 and 1, which along with channels 136-158 are ill-defined and thus rarely used, and often not included in otherwise cable-ready tuners. Those "lowest numbered" channels often reside between VHF channels four and five on HRC (harmonically related carrier) and IRC (incrementally related carrier) systems where the normally four MHz gap is increased to six MHz, wide enough for one NTSC channel. Similar situations exist in the rest of the world as well.

Another use of a cable-ready tuner is for receiving amateur television (ATV) in North America, where the main ATV band appears on cable channels 56 to 59, 57 being the most popular. Most repeaters output on these channels, while input from amateur operators is often in another band.

== Digital cable ==
Digital cable-ready or DCR is a label used by manufacturers on new televisions which feature built-in technology that allows consumers to receive SDTV and HDTV digital cable programs. Usually this is a QAM tuner, since over-the-air broadcasts are either COFDM (DVB-T and ISDB-T) or 8VSB (ATSC-T). Some cable TV systems in North America use 16VSB instead of 256QAM, for which there are no cable-ready devices. Only channels that are left unencrypted can be received using this method, however encrypted channels can be viewed without a set-top-box using systems such as a CableCard or using a Downloadable Conditional Access System.

Interactive digital cable ready or iDCR extends DCR. Unlike the DCR standard, iDCR supports interactive customer features such as electronic program guides, pay-per-view and video on demand. Consumer devices which support iDCR also support the new OpenCable Application Platform (OCAP) standard developed by CableLabs.

In practice however, the rental of cable converter boxes (or since the late 2010s, the rent-to-own arrangement of digital media players with a provider's app if the customer prefers) has remained a lucrative business line for most cable providers, and they have preferred to phase out support of analog or digital cable-ready televisions which are not CableCard compliant and rent converter boxes out instead, with prevention of cable theft another reason for the arrangement.
