= Cable television in the United States =

History and outline of American cable television

Cable television first became available in the United States in 1948. By 1989, 53 million American households received cable television subscriptions, with 60 percent of all U.S. households doing so in 1992. Most cable viewers in the U.S. reside in the suburbs and tend to be middle class; cable television is less common in low income, urban, and rural areas.

According to reports released by the Federal Communications Commission, traditional cable television subscriptions in the US peaked around the year 2000, at 68.5 million total subscriptions. Since then, cable subscriptions have been in slow decline, dropping to 54.4 million subscribers by December 2013. Some telephone service providers have started offering television, reaching to 11.3 million video subscribers as of December 2013.

A 2021 Pew Research Center survey found that the percentage of American adults that reported having a cable or satellite television subscription fell from 76% in 2015 to 56% in 2021, while a 2025 Pew Research Center survey found that only 36% of American adults reported having a cable or satellite television subscription.

== History ==
=== First systems ===
It is claimed that the first cable television system in the United States was created in 1948 in Mahanoy City, Pennsylvania by John Walson to provide television signals to people whose reception was poor because of tall mountains and buildings blocking TV signals. Mahanoy City was ideally suited for CATV services, since broadcast television signals could easily be received via mountaintop antennas and retransmitted by "twin-lead" or "ladder-lead" cable to the valley community below (where broadcast reception was very poor). Walson's "first" claim has long been questioned and his claimed starting date can not be verified. The United States Congress and the National Cable Television Association have recognized Walson as having invented cable television in the spring of 1948.

A CATV system was developed in the late 1940s by James F. Reynolds in his town of Maple Dale, Pennsylvania, which grew to include Sandy Lake, Stoneboro, Polk, Cochranton, and Meadville.

Even though Eastern Pennsylvania, particularly the counties of Schuylkill and Carbon in the anthracite coal region, had several of the earliest CATV systems, there were other CATV entrepreneurs scattered throughout the United States. One was James Y. Davidson of Tuckerman, Arkansas. Davidson was the local movie theater manager and ran a radio repair business on the side. In 1949, he set up a cable system to bring the signal of a newly launched Memphis, Tennessee station to his community, which was located too far away to receive the signal with set-top antennas alone.

Leroy E. "Ed" Parsons built the first cable television system in the United States that used coaxial cable, amplifiers, and a community antenna to deliver television signals to an area that otherwise would not have been able to receive broadcast television signals. In 1948, Parsons owned a radio station in Astoria, Oregon. A year earlier he and his wife had first seen television at a broadcasters' convention. In the spring of 1948, Parsons learned that radio station KRSC (now KKNW) in Seattle – 125 miles away – was going to launch a television station that fall. He found that with a large antenna he could receive KRSC's signal on the roof of the Hotel Astoria and from there he ran coaxial cable across the street to his apartment. When the station (now KING-TV) went on the air in November 1948, Parsons was the only one in town able to see television. According to MSNBC's Bob Sullivan, Parsons charged a $125 one-time set-up fee and a $3 a month service fee. In May 1968, Parsons was acknowledged as the father of community antenna television.

=== First commercial system ===
In 1950, Robert Tarlton developed the first commercial cable television system in the United States. Tarlton organized a group of fellow television set retailers in Lansford, Pennsylvania, a town in the same region as Mahanoy City, to offer television signals from Philadelphia, Pennsylvania broadcast stations to homes in Lansford for a fee. The system was featured in stories in The New York Times, Newsweek and The Wall Street Journal. The publicity of this successful early system set off a wave of cable system construction throughout the United States, and Tarlton himself became a highly sought-after consultant.

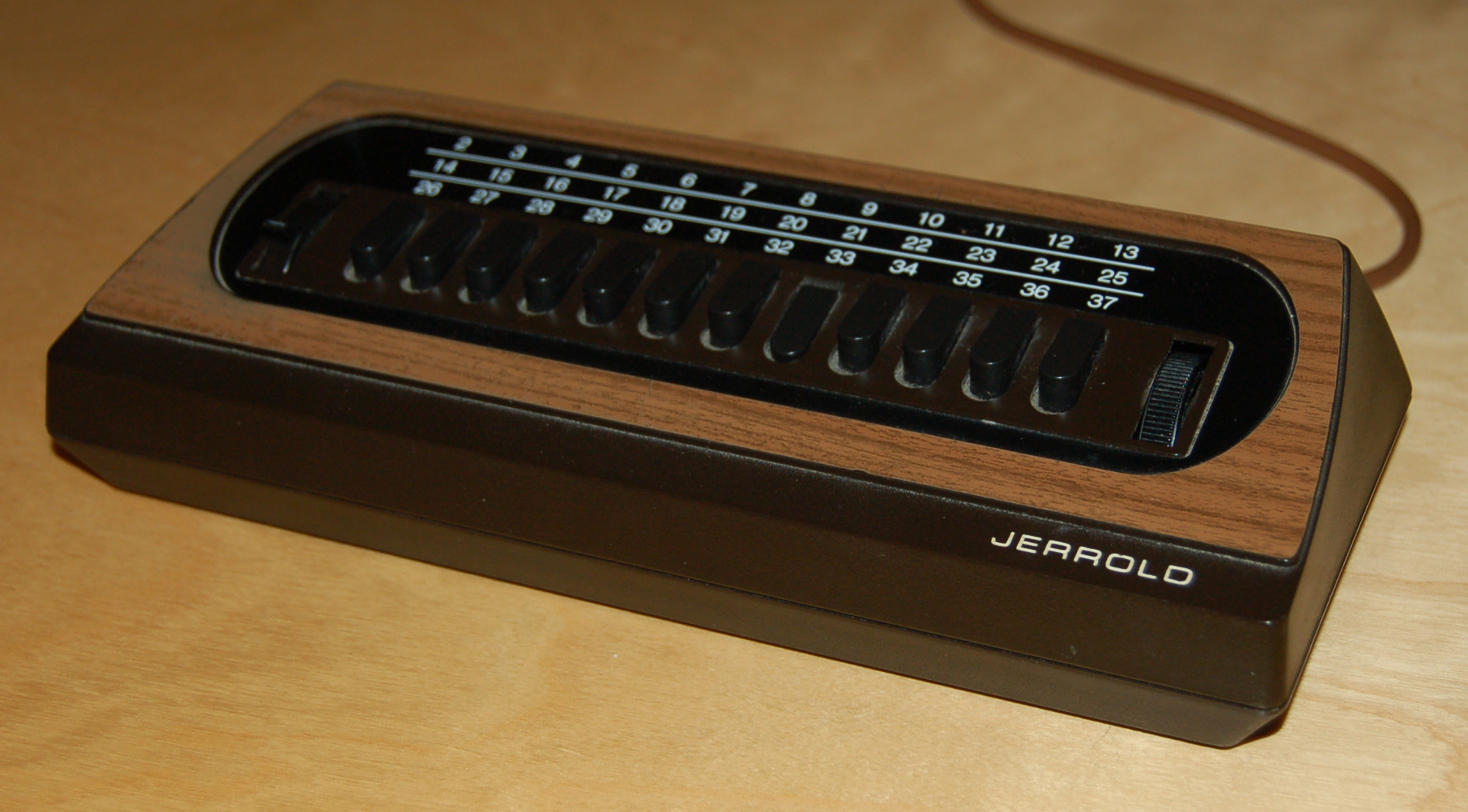
Very early Jerrold cable converter box from the late 1970s.

Tarlton used equipment manufactured by a new company, Jerrold Electronics. After seeing the success of the Tarlton system in 1950, Jerrold president (and future Pennsylvania governor) Milton Shapp reorganized his company to build equipment for the now-growing cable industry. In 1952, Tarlton went to work for Jerrold, helping to construct most of the major systems built by that company in the 1950s. Tarlton was also responsible for training many of the major operators of cable systems in the 1950s. In 2003, Tarlton was inducted in the Cable Television Hall of Fame for his work building the first widely publicized cable television company in America.

=== Early growth ===
The rise of free broadcast television during the 1950s greatly threatened the established entertainment industry by offering an alternative to the common practice of regularly paying to see films. The possibility of turning free television viewers into paid television viewers was discussed early on. For example, after 25 million American televisions tuned to a musical version of Cinderella in 1957, executives calculated that if the network had received 25¢ for each television tuned to the show, it would have earned more than $6 million without distribution costs. However, due to many legal, regulatory and technological obstacles, cable television in the United States in its first 24 years was used almost exclusively to relay terrestrial commercial television stations to remote and inaccessible areas. It also became popular in other areas in which mountainous terrain caused poor reception over the air. Original programming over cable came in 1972 with deregulation of the industry.

During the Federal Communications Commission (FCC)'s freeze on television licenses from 1948 to 1952, the demand for television increased. Since new television station licenses were not being issued, the only way the demand was met, even in communities with one or more operating broadcast stations, was by Community Antenna Television (CATV), as early cable was known (so named because of the literal sharing of a very large receiving antenna by an entire community).

=== 1980–2015: Cable reaches its peak ===
In the 1980s, the number of homes with cable grew dramatically, from an estimated 16 million in 1980 to 50 million in 1990. The growth of cable offered new opportunities for entrepreneurs and media companies to reach niche audiences. Coming on the heels of the 1979 launch of Nickelodeon children's network and the ESPN sports channel, Ted Turner founded CNN, a 24-hour news network, in 1980, and TNT in 1988. Warner-Amex Satellite Entertainment launched MTV, a music video network, in 1981.

The growth was fueled by a combination of a more favorable regulatory environment and the spread of new technology such as improved wiring and satellite technology, which made more channels available to more households. The growth continued in the 1990s, with coverage reaching 67.7 million homes by 2000. In 1996, Rupert Murdoch launched Fox News, while a partnership of NBC News and Microsoft introduced MSNBC, a news outlet that had a presence on cable and the internet.

Writing in Forbes, media and advertising consultant Brad Adgate said cable TV "was in its zenith" in the early 2010s because more than 100 million households subscribed to pay TV and the industry's 2013-14 estimate said cable would surpass broadcast TV for the first time.

== Regulation ==
=== Policy history ===
On August 1, 1949, T.J. Slowie, a secretary of the Federal Communications Commission, sent a letter to Parsons requesting that he "furnish [to] the Commission full information with respect to the nature of the system you may have developed and may be operating." This is the first known involvement of the FCC in CATV. An FCC lawyer, E. Stratford Smith, determined the Commission could exercise common carrier jurisdiction over CATV. The FCC did not act on this opinion, and Smith later changed his mind after working in the cable industry for some time. Further, Smith's decision was influenced by his experiences testifying several times in United States Senate committee hearings. Senator, and future FCC commissioner, Kenneth A. Cox attended and participated in these hearings. He prepared a report for the Senate Committee on Interstate and Foreign Commerce against CATV and supporting the FCC policy of a television station in every community.

In 1959 and 1961, bills were introduced in Congress of the United States that would have determined the role of the FCC in CATV policy. Chief architect of some of these bills was attorney Yolanda G. Barco. She was one of the first female executives in cable, described as the "principal attorney for cable television interests during the industry's formative years". The 1959 bill, which made it to the floor of the Senate, would have limited FCC jurisdiction to CATV systems within the contours (or the broadcast range) of a single station; however, the bill was defeated. The 1961 bill proposed by the FCC would have given the Commission authority over CATV as CATV, and not as a common carrier or broadcaster. The Commission could then adopt rules and regulations "in the public interest" to govern CATV in any area covered both by CATV and broadcast television. No action was ever taken on this bill.

More important than Congressional action in determining Federal Communications Commission CATV policy were court cases and FCC hearings. In Frontier Broadcasting Co. v. Collier, broadcasters tried to compel the FCC to exercise common carrier authority over 288 CATV systems in 36 states. The broadcasters maintained that CATV went against the FCC's Sixth Report and Order, which advocated at least one television station in every community. In 1958, the FCC decided that CATV was not really a common carrier since the subscriber did not determine the programming. Carter Mountain Transmission Corp., a common carrier that already transmitted television signals by microwave to CATV systems in several Wyoming towns, wanted to add a second signal to two of the towns and add two signals to a previously unserved town. A television station in one town opposed this and protested to the FCC on the grounds of economic damage. A hearing examiner supported Carter Mountain, but the Commission supported the television station. The case was taken to appeal, and the Federal Communications Commission won. "The fact that no broadcaster has actually gone off the air due to CATV competition at the time the government moved to expand its authority (nor have any since) did not stay the momentum for the expansion of regulatory authority. That some economic impact was merely plausible sufficed as the basis for government concern and government action". The FCC overruled a hearing examiner in favor of broadcasters again in the "San Diego Case". The CATV systems in San Diego, California wanted to import stations from Los Angeles, some of which could be seen in San Diego; the television stations in San Diego did not want the signals to be imported. The television stations won, not allowing the signals on future cable lines in San Diego and its environs. The FCC's reasoning was to protect existing and future UHF stations in San Diego. (One of the pioneers of cable TV was KSA-TV)

In the First Report and Order by the Federal Communications Commission on CATV, the FCC gave itself the power to regulate CATV. This Report and Order was designed to protect television stations in small towns. It did this by imposing two rules, which slightly altered form: one requires that a CATV system carry all local stations in which the CATV system is in the A- (best reception) contour of the station. The second prohibits the importation of programs from a non-local station that duplicates programming on a local station if the duplication is shown either 15 days before or after its local airing. This 1965 report reasoning is as follows: 1) CATV should carry local stations because CATV supplements, not replaces, local stations; and, the non-carriage of local stations gives distant stations an advantage since people will not change from the cable to the antenna to see a local station; 2) non-carriage is "inherently contrary to the public interest"; and, 3) CATV duplication of local programming via distant signals is unfair since broadcasters and CATV do not compete for programs on an equal footing; the FCC recommended "a reasonable measure of exclusivity".

The 1966 Second Report and Order made some minor changes in the First Report and Order and added a major regulation. This was designed to protect UHF stations in large cities. The new rule disallowed the importation of distant signals into the top 100 markets, thus making CATV at that time profitable only in cities with poor reception. In 1968, the Supreme Court upheld the FCC's right to make rules and regulations concerning CATV. In its decision on United States v. Southwestern Cable, the "San Diego Case", it said "the Commission's authority over 'all interstate ... communications by wire or radio' permits the regulation of CATV systems."

=== Carriage ===
Carriage refers to the agreement under which a cable provider rebroadcasts a television channel on its network. The Federal Communications Commission puts various requirements on these agreements, which may include channels cable providers are required to carry, and moderates disputes over the fees and conditions of any particular agreement.

=== Local Origination Programming ===
During the early 1980s, various live local programs with local interests were rapidly being created all over the United States in select major television markets due to specific recent legislative mandates from congress. Before there was public access TV, one of Time Inc.'s pioneering stations was in Columbus, Ohio, where Richard Sillman, an early teenage pioneer in Cable TV, became the nation's youngest cable television director for Local Origination Programming at age 16 (one of the first) of a live weekly broadcast, for over two years. In the early 1970s, Robert and Jeanne Burull were very early pioneers with a cable system in Wisconsin featuring live broadcasts of sports, local city council meetings, and school board events.

=== Public-access television ===
In 1969, the FCC issued rules requiring all CATV systems with over 3,500 subscribers to have facilities for local origination of programming by April 1, 1971; the date was later suspended. In 1972, Dean Burch steered the FCC into a new area of regulation. It lifted its restrictions on CATV in large cities, but now put the burden of more local programming on CATV operators. In 1976, the FCC used its rule-making power to require that new systems now had to have 20 channels, and that cable providers with systems of 3,500 subscribers or more had to provide Public, educational, and government access (PEG) services with facilities and equipment necessary to use this channel capacity.

== Programming ==
=== Basic cable ===
Cable television programming is often divided between basic and premium television. Basic cable networks are generally those with wide carriage on the lowest service tiers of multichannel television providers. In the era of analog cable television, these channels were typically transmitted without any encryption or other scrambling methods. These networks can vary in format, ranging from those targeting mainstream audiences, to specialty networks that are focused on specific genres, demographics, or niches. Basic cable networks depend on a mix of per-subscriber carriage fees paid by the provider, and revenue from advertising sold on the service, as their sources of revenue.

One of the first "basic cable" networks was TBS—which was initially established as a satellite uplink of an independent television station (the present-day WPCH-TV) in Atlanta, Georgia. TBS would serve as the starting point for other major basic cable ventures by its owner, Ted Turner, including CNN—the first 24-hour news channel. Another early network was the CBN Satellite Service, a Christian television service launched by televangelist Pat Robertson in April 1977 as the television ministry of his Christian Broadcasting Network, that was delivered by satellite as a more efficient way to distribute the programming. For years, the CBN Satellite Service (later renamed CBN Cable Network in 1984) mixed religious programming with reruns of classic television series to fill out its 24-hour schedule. The network changed its name to The CBN Family Channel in 1988 (revised to The Family Channel in 1990 once CBN spun it out to an indirectly owned for-profit company, International Family Entertainment). It was subsequently renamed Fox Family in 1998 after it was acquired by a partnership between Fox Entertainment Group and Saban Entertainment, then ABC Family after its 2001 sale to ABC parent The Walt Disney Company, and finally to its current name, Freeform in 2016.

=== Premium cable ===
The origins of premium cable lie in two areas: early pay television systems of the 1950s and 1960s and early cable (CATV) operators' small efforts to add extra channels to their systems that were not derived from free-to-air signals. In more recent years, premium cable refers to networks–such as Home Box Office (HBO), Cinemax, Showtime, The Movie Channel, Flix, Starz, MoviePlex, and Epix–that scramble or encrypt their signals so that only those paying additional monthly fees to their cable system can legally view them (via the use of a converter box). Because their programming is commercial-free (except for promotions in-between shows for the networks' own content), these networks command much higher fees from cable systems. Premium services have the discretion to offer the service unencrypted to a certain number of participating cable providers during a short-term free preview period to allow those who do not receive a premium service to sample its programming, in an effort for subscribers to the participant provider to consider obtaining a subscription to the offered service to continue viewing it following the preview period.

HBO was the first true premium cable (or "pay-cable") network as well as the first television network intended for cable distribution on a regional or national basis; however, there were notable precursors to premium cable in the pay-television industry that operated during the 1950s and 1960s (with a few systems lingering until 1980), as well as some attempts by free-to-air broadcasters during the 1970s and 1980s that ultimately folded as their subscriber bases declined amid viewer shifts to receiving premium television content delivered by cable providers that had begun operating in metropolitan areas throughout that period. In its infancy, following its launch over Service Electric Cable's Wilkes-Barre, Pennsylvania, system on November 8, 1972, HBO had been quietly providing pay programming to CATV systems in Pennsylvania and New York, using microwave technology to transmit its programming to cable and MMDS providers. In 1975, HBO became the first cable network to be delivered nationwide by satellite transmission. Although such conversions are rare, some present-day basic cable channels have originated as premium services, including the Disney Channel (from 1983 to 1997), AMC (from 1984 to 1988), and Bravo (from 1982 to 1994); some of these services eventually switched to an advertiser-supported model after transitioning to an unencrypted structure. Other fledgling premium services (such as early HBO spin-off efforts Take 2 and Festival, Home Theater Network and Spotlight) have lasted for a few years, only to fail due to the inability to compete against established premium services that had broader distribution and higher subscriber totals.

Since cable television channels are not broadcast on public spectrum, they are not subject to FCC regulations on indecent material. Premium networks generally offer broader portrayal of profanity, sex and violence; some premium services–such as Cinemax and The Movie Channel (which have carried such programs as part of their late-night schedules) as well as Playboy TV, one of the first adult-oriented premium cable services–have even offered softcore pornography as part of their programming inventory.

While there are no FCC rules that apply to content on basic cable networks, many self-regulate their program content due to demographic targeting, or because of viewer and advertiser expectations, particularly with regard to profane language and nudity. In recent years, however, some networks have become more lenient towards content aired during late-primetime and late-night hours. In addition, some channels, such as FX, have positioned themselves with an original programming direction more akin to premium services, with a focus on more "mature" and creator-driven series to help attract critical acclaim and key demographic viewership. Turner Classic Movies has aired uncut and commercial-free prints of theatrical films that have featured nudity, sexual content, violence and profanity, as had the now-ad-supported SundanceTV and IFC, the former of which began as a premium service, spun off from Showtime. Commercial-free basic channels have tended to rate their film presentations using the TV Parental Guidelines, instead of the Motion Picture Association of America (MPAA) ratings system.

=== À la carte cable ===
Since the early 21st century, some have advocated for laws that would require cable providers to offer their subscribers their own "à la carte" choice of channels. Unlike the standardized subscription packages being offered currently, an à la carte model requires the customer to subscribe to each channel individually. It is not clear how this might affect subscription costs over all, but it would allow a parent to censor their child's viewing habits by removing any channel they deem objectionable from their subscription. Offering such individualized subscriptions would have been relatively complicated and labor-intensive using analog cable, but the widespread adoption of digital cable & IPTV technologies have now made it more feasible.

Analog technology allowed cable providers to offer standardized subscription packages using low-pass filters and notch filters. A low-pass filter lets lower frequency signals pass while removing higher frequency signals. Using such filtering, the cable provider offered "economy basic" subscriptions (local channels only; these appear at the lowest frequency signals, denoted by the lowest channel numbers) and "basic" subscriptions (local channels plus a handful of national channels with frequencies just higher than the local stations). Notch filters were used to filter out a "notch" of channels from an analog cable signal (for example, channels 45-50 could be "notched" out and the subscriber still receives channels below 45 and above 50). This allowed cable providers to open standardized ranges of premium channels to the subscriber, but notch filtering was not a feasible way to offer each subscriber their own individual choice of channels.

To offer "à la carte" service using an analog signal, a cable provider would most likely have to scramble every channel and send a technician to each subscriber's home to unscramble their choice of channels on their set-top box. Each change an analog cable customer made in their subscription would then require an additional home visit to reprogram their set-top box. Offering the customer their choice of channels à la carte has become more cost-effective with the advent of digital cable, because a digital set-top converter box can be programmed remotely. IPTV (i.e., delivering TV channels over an internet or IP-based network) is even less labor-intensive, delivering channels to the consumer automatically.

Currently, digital cable and satellite delivery systems with standardized subscriptions are providing an opportunity for networks that service niche and minority audiences to reach millions of households, and potentially, millions of viewers. Since à la carte could force each channel to be sold individually, such networks worry they could face a significant reduction in subscription fees and advertising revenue, and potentially be driven out of business. Many cable/satellite providers are therefore reluctant to introduce an à la carte business model. They fear it will reduce the overall choice of viewing content, making their service less appealing to customers. Some believe the à la carte option could actually increase overall sales by allowing potential subscribers a less expensive entry point into the cable marketplace. Some cable/satellite providers might wish to sell channels à la carte, but their contracts with programmers often require the more standardized approach.

== Digital cable ==
Starting in the late 1990s, advances in digital signal processing (primarily Motorola's DigiCipher 2 video compression technology in North America) gave rise to wider implementation of digital cable services. Digital cable television provides many more television channels over the same available bandwidth, by converting cable channels to a digital signal and then compressing the signal. Currently, most systems offer only digital cable television, although some still offer a hybrid analog/digital cable system. This means they offer a certain number of analog channels via their basic cable service with additional channels being made available via their digital cable service.

Digital cable channels are touted as being able to offer a higher quality picture than their analog counterparts. However, digital compression has a tendency to soften the quality of the television picture, particularly of channels that are more heavily compressed. Pixelation and other artifacts are often visible.

=== Set-top boxes ===
Subscribers wishing to have access to digital cable channels must have either a "Digital Cable Ready" television, or a cable converter box, and a CableCARD.

AllVid was a CableCARD replacement. It was proposed by the United States Federal Communications Commission (FCC). Cable system operators believed that their customers would like to have the opportunity to purchase services that relied on the capabilities of "two-way cable" (i.e., both from the cable company to the consumer and from the consumer to the cable company, using the same cable). Examples are news and information services, interactive program guides, video-on-demand, and pay-per-view television. At the time, CableCARD-ready devices were unable to provide reliable access to these services. Within the FCC's Cable TV Bureau, staff recognized this missing link and its potential negative impact on the public. The Cable Bureau was then charged to develop the Commission's AllVid proposal in order to ameliorate this impact..

== Cable television fees and programming lineups ==
Cable television systems impose a monthly fee depending on the number and perceived quality of the channels offered. Cable television subscribers are offered various packages of channels one can subscribe to. The cost of each package depends on the type of channels offered (basic vs. premium) and the quantity. These fees cover the fees paid to individual cable channels for the right to carry their programming, as well as the cost of operating and maintaining the cable television system so that their signals can reach subscribers' homes. Additional cable television franchise fees and taxes are often tacked on by local, state, and federal governments.

Most cable systems divide their channel lineups ("tiers") into three or four basic channel packages. A must-carry rule requires all cable television systems to carry all full-power local commercial broadcast stations in the designated television market on their lineups, unless those stations opt to invoke retransmission consent and demand compensation, in which case the cable provider can decline to carry the channel (especially if the provider feels that the rate of carrying an existing service would result in an increase of the average price of a tier to levels to which it could result in a subscriber possibly dropping the service).

Cable television systems are also required to offer a subscription package that provides these broadcast channels at a lower rate than the standard subscription rate. The basic programming package offered by cable television systems is usually known as "basic cable" and provides access to a large number of cable television channels, as well as broadcast television networks (e.g., ABC, CBS, NBC, Fox, The CW, MyNetworkTV, Telemundo, Univision, UniMás, PBS), public, educational, and government access channels, free or low-cost public service channels such as C-SPAN and NASA TV, and several channels devoted to infomercials, brokered televangelism and home shopping to defray costs. Some providers may provide a small number of national cable networks in their basic lineups. Most systems differentiate between basic cable, which has locals, home shopping channels and local-access television channels, and expanded basic (or "standard"), which carries most of the better-known national cable networks. Most basic cable lineups have approximately 20 channels overall, while expanded basic has channel capacity for as many as 70 channels. Under U.S. regulations, the price of basic cable can be regulated by local authorities as part of their franchise agreements. Standard, or expanded basic, cable is not subject to price controls.

In addition to the basic cable packages, all systems offer premium channel add-on packages offering either just one premium network (for example, HBO) or several premium networks for one price (for example, HBO and Showtime together). Finally, most cable systems offer pay-per-view channels where users can watch individual movies, live events, sports and other programs for an additional fee for single viewing at a scheduled time (this is generally the main place where pornographic content airs on American cable). Some cable systems have begun to offer on-demand programming, where customers can select programs from a list of offerings including recent releases of movies, concerts, sports, first-run television shows and specials and start the program whenever they wish, as if they were watching a DVD or a VHS tape (although some on demand services, generally those offered by broadcast networks, restrict the ability to fast forward through a program). Some of the offerings have a cost similar to renting a movie at a video store while others are free. On-demand content has slowly been replacing traditional pay-per-view for pre-recorded content; pay-per-view remains popular for live combat sports events (boxing, mixed martial arts and professional wrestling).

Additional subscription fees are also usually required to receive digital cable channels.

Many cable systems operate as de facto monopolies in the United States. While exclusive franchises are currently prohibited by federal law, and relatively few franchises were ever expressly exclusive, frequently only one cable company offers cable service in a given community. Overbuilders in the U.S., other than telephone companies with existing infrastructure, have traditionally had severe difficulty in financial and market penetration numbers. Overbuilders have had some success in the MDU market, in which relationships are established with landlords, sometimes with contracts and exclusivity agreements for the buildings, sometimes to the anger of tenants. The rise of direct broadcast satellite systems providing the same type of programming using small satellite receivers, and of Verizon FiOS and other recent ventures by incumbent local exchange carriers such as U-verse, have also provided competition to incumbent cable television systems.

=== Subscriber fees ===
Many cable channels charge cable providers "subscriber fees," in order to carry their content. The fee that the cable service provider must pay to a cable television channel can vary depending on whether it is a basic or premium channel and the perceived popularity of that channel. Because cable service providers are not required to carry all cable channels, they may negotiate the fee they will pay for carrying a channel. Typically, more popular cable channels command higher fees. For example, ESPN typically charges $10 per month for its suite of networks ($7 for the main channel alone), by far the highest of any non-premium American cable channel, comparable to the premium channels, and rising rapidly. Other widely viewed cable channels have been able to command fees of over 50 cents per subscriber per month; channels can vary widely in fees depending on if they are included in package deals with other channels.

== Industry organizations ==
Several national organizations support the business side of the American cable industry. NCTA – The Internet & Television Association represents cable operators and programmers on public policy and federal lobbying. CTAM (formerly the Cable & Telecommunications Association for Marketing) provides cooperative marketing, communications and executive education programs for multiple-system operators, programmers and suppliers. Its national initiatives have included CableMover and TV Everywhere, and it runs an executive management program at Harvard Business School. In 2017 the Association of Cable Communicators, which represented the industry's communications and public affairs professionals, became part of CTAM. Other industry bodies include CableLabs, the industry's research and development consortium; The Cable Center, which maintains the Barco Library archive of cable history; and the National Association for Multi-Ethnicity in Communications (NAMIC).

== Statistics ==
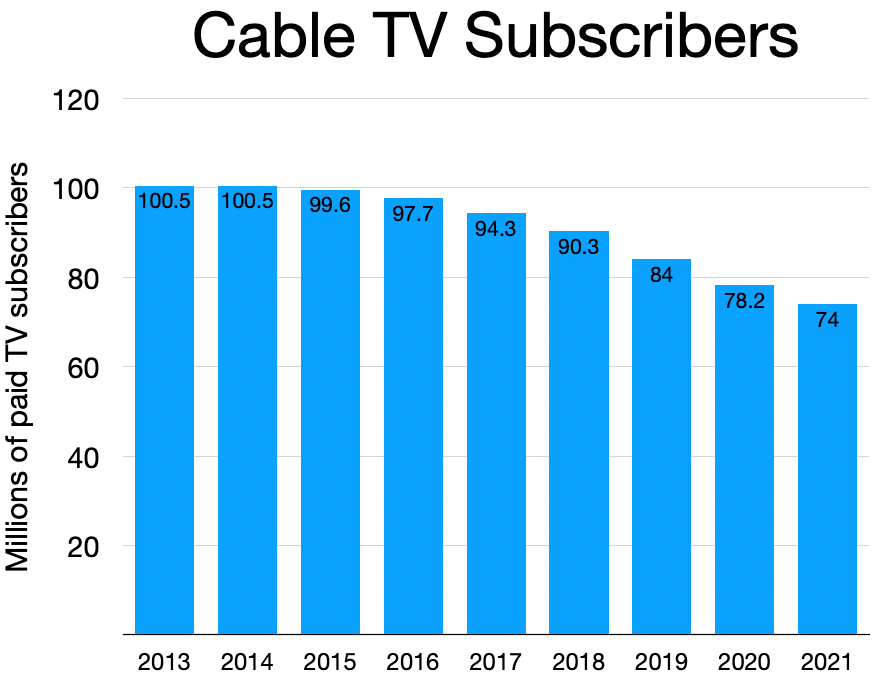
Cable TV Subscribers

Total US cable subscribers by year
Year	Cable TV subscribers	Telephone company TV subscribers
Jan. 1970	4,500,000	
Jan. 1975	9,800,000	
Jan. 1980	16,000,000	
Jan. 1984	30,000,000	
Jan. 1985	32,000,000	
Jan. 1986	37,500,000	
Jan. 1987	41,100,000	
Jan. 1988	44,000,000	
Jan. 1989	47,500,000	
Jan. 1990	50,000,000	
Dec. 1990	51,700,000	
Dec. 1991	53,400,000	
Dec. 1992	55,200,000	
Dec. 1993	57,200,000	
Dec. 1994	59,700,000	
Dec. 1995	62,100,000	
Dec. 1996	63,500,000	
Dec. 1997	64,900,000	
Dec. 1998	66,100,000	
Dec. 1999	67,300,000	
Dec. 2000	68,500,000	
Jun. 2001	66,732,000	
Jun. 2002	66,472,000	
Jun. 2003	66,050,000	
Jun. 2004	66,100,000	
Jun. 2005	65,400,000	
Jun. 2006	65,300,000	
Dec. 2006	65,400,000	300,000
Dec. 2007	64,900,000	1,300,000
Dec. 2008	63,700,000	3,100,000
Dec. 2009	62,100,000	5,100,000
Dec. 2010	59,800,000	6,900,000
Dec. 2011	58,000,000	8,500,000
Dec. 2012	56,400,000	9,900,000
Dec. 2013	54,400,000	11,300,000
Dec. 2014	53,700,000	13,200,000
Dec. 2015	53,223,000	13,041,000
Dec. 2016	52,800,000	11,500,000
Dec. 2017	51,900,000	10,600,000
Dec. 2018	93,400,000	
Dec. 2019	90,000,000	
Dec. 2020	84,200,000	
Dec. 2021	74,200,000	
Dec. 2022	69,500,000	
Dec. 2023	62,800,000	
Dec. 2024	56,600,000	
Dec. 2025	55,300,000	

== See also ==
- Big Three television networks
- Communications in the United States
- Fourth television network
- High-definition television in the United States
- Lists of television stations in the United States
- List of United States pay television channels
- List of United States over-the-air television networks
- List of United States television markets
- Multichannel television in the United States
- Satellite television in the United States
- Television in the United States
- Television news in the United States
- United States cable news
- Captain Midnight broadcast signal intrusion
