= Cable theft =

Cable theft may refer to:

- Metal theft, the theft of physical electrical cable for its scrap metal value
- Cable television piracy, a form of copyright infringement which provides free subscription television
