= Digital Keystone =

American video technology company

Digital Keystone, Inc.
- Type: Private
- Industry: Video Technology
- Founded: 2001; 25 years ago
- Headquarters: Cupertino, California, U.S.
- Key people: Paolo Siccardo (president and CEO)
- Products: PRISMA, PODware, HPNX Pro, Maelstrom
- Website: digitalkeystone.com

Digital Keystone, Inc. is a video technology company, based in Cupertino, California, that develops digital entertainment technologies that bridge Pay TV with the new digital home. DK solutions include security and navigation software. Digital Keystone also develops industry-standard validation tools for development, certification, and manufacturing. DK technologies enable content access throughout the entire home, offering security, interactive services, and device connectivity.

== History ==
Digital Keystone licenses its technologies to TV broadcasters, to manufacturers of consumer electronics, to developers of digital home components, and to manufacturers of integrated circuits that power consumer electronic devices and digital home components. In partnership with Microsoft and CableLabs, the company developed "OCUR", the world's first secure Pay TV bridge. The first OCUR prototype, developed by Digital Keystone, was demonstrated by Bill Gates in his keynote speech during the 2006 Consumer Electronics Show. During the same Consumer Electronics Show, ATI Technologies demonstrated the ATI OCUR product, manufactured under license. In 2007 Michael Dell announced the commercial launch of the product during his CES keynote.

In September 2008, Digital Keystone announced a licensing agreement with Thomson SA that allows the consumer electronics manufacturer to include Digital Keystone's PODware solution in its tru2way set-top-boxes.

In addition to consumer electronic software components, Digital Keystone, Inc. develops industry-standard test tools that are used to validate content security interoperability for major Pay TV systems worldwide. These tools verify compliance with published content security standards such as OpenCable and Cablecard. As an example CableLabs utilizes Digital Keystone tools to qualify M-Card devices. Digital Keystone tools such as HPNX PRO have been utilized to certify digital televisions, personal video recorders, and set-top-boxes.

The Digital Keystone Maelstrom technology has been featured at the 2010 CableLabs Innovation Showcase in Keystone, Colorado; at the 2010 International Broadcasting Convention in Amsterdam with Intel and Adobe Systems; at the 2011 Consumer Electronics Show in Las Vegas with Intel; at the 2011 National Cable Television Association show in Chicago with Intel; at the 2012 Consumer Electronics Show in Las Vegas with Intel; and at the 2013 Consumer Electronics Show in Las Vegas with Netgear.

As of June 2010, according to the National Cable & Telecommunications Association ("NCTA"), Digital Keystone customers have shipped over 21 million certified consumer electronic devices.

Digital Keystone, Inc. was ranked as one of Silicon Valley's 50 fastest growing companies in Inc Magazine's Inc 5000 list for 2008.
