= Cable television =

Television content transmitted via signals on coaxial or fibre-optic cable

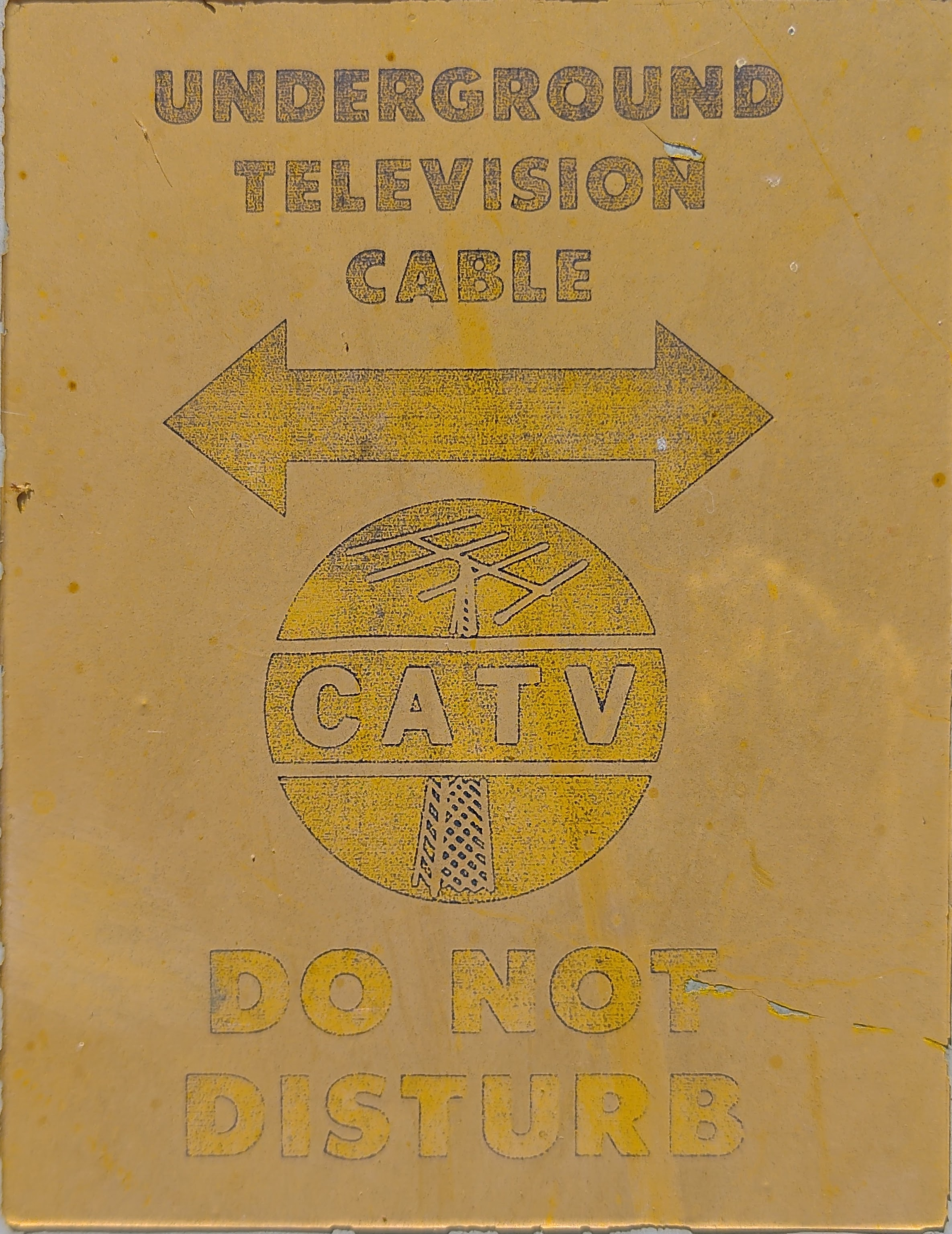
A sign warning about a buried CATV cable in the area

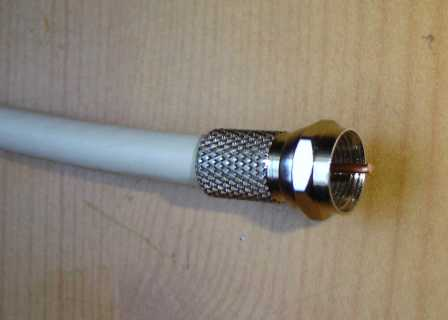
A coaxial cable used to carry cable television to the subscribers' premises

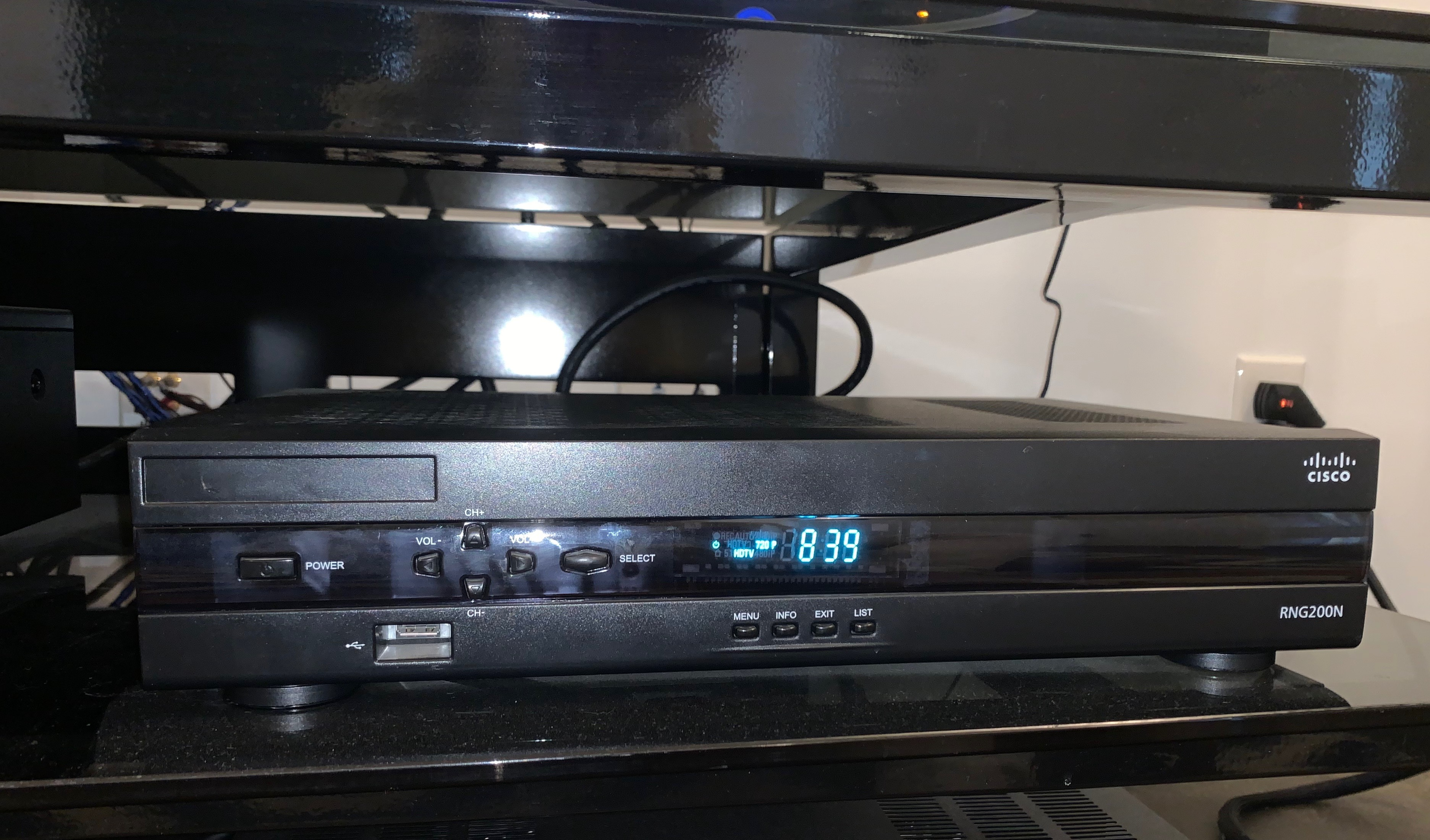
A set-top box is an electronic device that receives the cable signal into the television set. Presented unit is a Cisco RNG200N for QAM digital cable television system used in North America.

Cable television is a system for delivering broadcast programming to viewers by radio frequency (RF) signals transmitted through coaxial cable and through fibre-optic cable. Cable television is contrasted with terrestrial television, wherein the television signal is transmitted over-the-air by radio waves and received by a television antenna; and with satellite television, wherein a communications satellite transmits the television signal over-the-air by way of radio waves which then are received by a satellite dish antenna. A cable channel (also cable network) is television programming transmitted by cable (coaxial or optical fibre) and by satellite television. Alternative terms for a cable channel include non-broadcast channel and programming service, the latter term is used in legal contexts.

In the U.S., in 1948, in order to provide television services to the rural areas of the country where the geography blocked television signals, the Community Antenna Television (CATV) program erected large television antennas atop hills and mountains, from which the coaxial cable was directly connected to the individual houses of the community. In 1968, 6.4 percent of households in the U.S. had cable television service, 7.5 percent in 1978, 52.8 percent in 1988, and 62.4 percent of households in 1994. Moreover, FM radio programming, high-speed Internet, and telephony communication services also are transmitted by cables. In the 20th century, analog television was the television standard, but in the 21st century, cable television systems have been upgraded to digital cable operations.

== Distribution ==
To receive cable television at a given location, cable distribution lines must be available on the local utility poles or underground utility lines. Coaxial cable brings the signal to the customer's building through a service drop, an overhead or underground cable. If the subscriber's building does not have a cable service drop, the cable company will install one. The standard cable used in the U.S. is RG-6, which has a 75 ohm impedance, and connects with a type F connector. The cable company's portion of the wiring usually ends at a distribution box on the building exterior, and built-in cable wiring in the walls usually distributes the signal to jacks in different rooms to which televisions are connected. Multiple cables to different rooms are split off the incoming cable with a small device called a splitter. There are two standards for cable television: older analog cable, and newer digital cable, which can carry data signals used by digital television receivers such as high-definition television (HDTV) equipment. All cable companies in the United States have switched to or are in the course of switching to digital cable television since it was first introduced in the late 1990s.

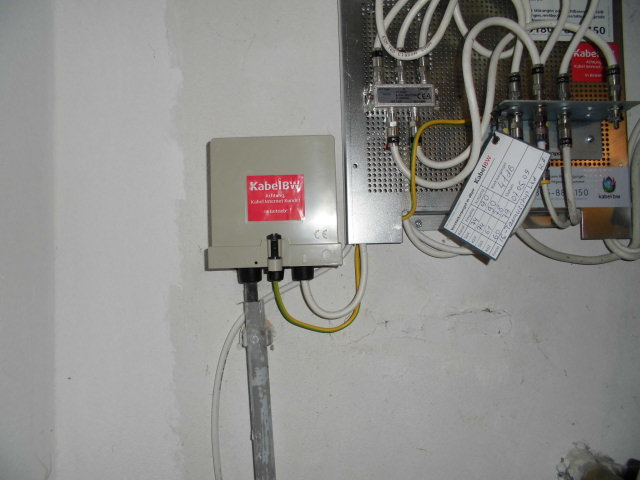
A cable television distribution box (left) in the basement of a building in Germany (Kabel BW network, now Vodafone), with a splitter (right) which supplies the signal to separate cables which go to different rooms

Most cable companies require a set-top box (cable converter box) or a slot on one's TV set for conditional access module cards to view their cable channels, even on newer televisions with digital cable QAM tuners, because most digital cable channels are now encrypted, or scrambled, to reduce cable service theft. A cable from the jack in the wall is attached to the input of the box, and an output cable from the box is attached to the television, usually the RF-IN or composite input on older TVs. Since the set-top box only decodes the single channel that is being watched, each television in the house requires a separate box. Some unencrypted channels, usually traditional over-the-air broadcast networks, can be displayed without a receiver box. The cable company will provide set-top boxes based on the level of service a customer purchases, from basic set-top boxes with a standard-definition picture connected through the standard coaxial connection on the TV, to high-definition wireless digital video recorder (DVR) receivers connected via HDMI or component. Older analog television sets are cable ready and can receive the old analog cable without a set-top box. To receive digital cable channels on an analog television set, even unencrypted ones, requires a different type of box, a digital television adapter supplied by the cable company or purchased by the subscriber. Another new distribution method that takes advantage of the low-cost, high-quality DVB distribution to residential areas, uses TV gateways to convert the DVB-C, DVB-C2 stream to IP for distribution of TV over an IP network in the home. Many cable companies offer internet access through DOCSIS.

== Principle of operation ==
In the most common system of cable television, multiple television channels are distributed to subscribers through a coaxial cable, which branches from a trunkline cable that originates at the cable television headend that distributes the TV signal. Multiple TV channels can be transmitted through one coaxial cable with the technique of frequency division multiplexing. At the headend, each television channel is translated to a different frequency; by giving each channel a different frequency slot in the cable, the separate television signals do not interfere with each other. At an outdoor cable box at the residence of the TV service subscriber, the company's service drop-cable is connected to cables distributing the signal to different rooms in the house. At each television set, the subscriber's TV set or a set-top box from the cable company retranslates the desired channel to its original baseband (frequency) for display in the TV screen. Consequent to cable television piracy in the early analogue cable-TV systems, modern digital TV signals are encrypted and the set-top box must be activated with an activation code provided by the cable TV company.

A modern hybrid fiber-coaxial cable television system. At the regional cable television headend, the TV channels are sent multiplexed on a light beam which travels through optical fiber trunklines, which then extend from distribution hubs to optical nodes in local communities. The light signal from the optical fibre is translated to a radio frequency electrical signal, which is distributed through coaxial cable to individual houses.

There are also usually upstream channels on the cable to send data from the customer box to the cable headend, for advanced features such as requesting pay-per-view shows or movies, cable internet access, and cable telephone service. The downstream channels occupy a band of frequencies from approximately 50 MHz to 1 GHz, while the upstream channels occupy frequencies of 5 to 42 MHz. Subscribers pay a monthly fee. Subscribers can choose from several levels of service, with premium packages including more channels but costing a higher rate. At the local headend, the feed signals from the individual television channels are received by dish antennas from communication satellites. Additional local channels, such as local broadcast television stations, educational channels from local colleges, and community access channels devoted to local governments (PEG channels) are usually included on the cable service. Commercial advertisements for local businesses are also inserted in the programming at the headend (the individual channels, which are distributed nationally, also have their own nationally oriented commercials).

=== Hybrid fiber-coaxial ===
Modern cable systems are large, with a single network and headend often serving an entire metropolitan area. Most systems use hybrid fiber-coaxial (HFC) distribution; this means the trunklines that carry the signal from the headend to local neighborhoods are optical fiber to provide greater bandwidth and also extra capacity for future expansion. At the headend, the electrical signal is translated into an optical signal and sent through the fiber. The fiber trunkline goes to several distribution hubs, from which multiple fibers fan out to carry the signal to boxes called optical nodes in local communities. At the optical node, the optical signal is translated back into an electrical signal and carried by coaxial cable distribution lines on utility poles, from which cables branch out to a series of signal amplifiers and line extenders. These devices carry the signal to customers via passive RF devices called taps.

== History ==
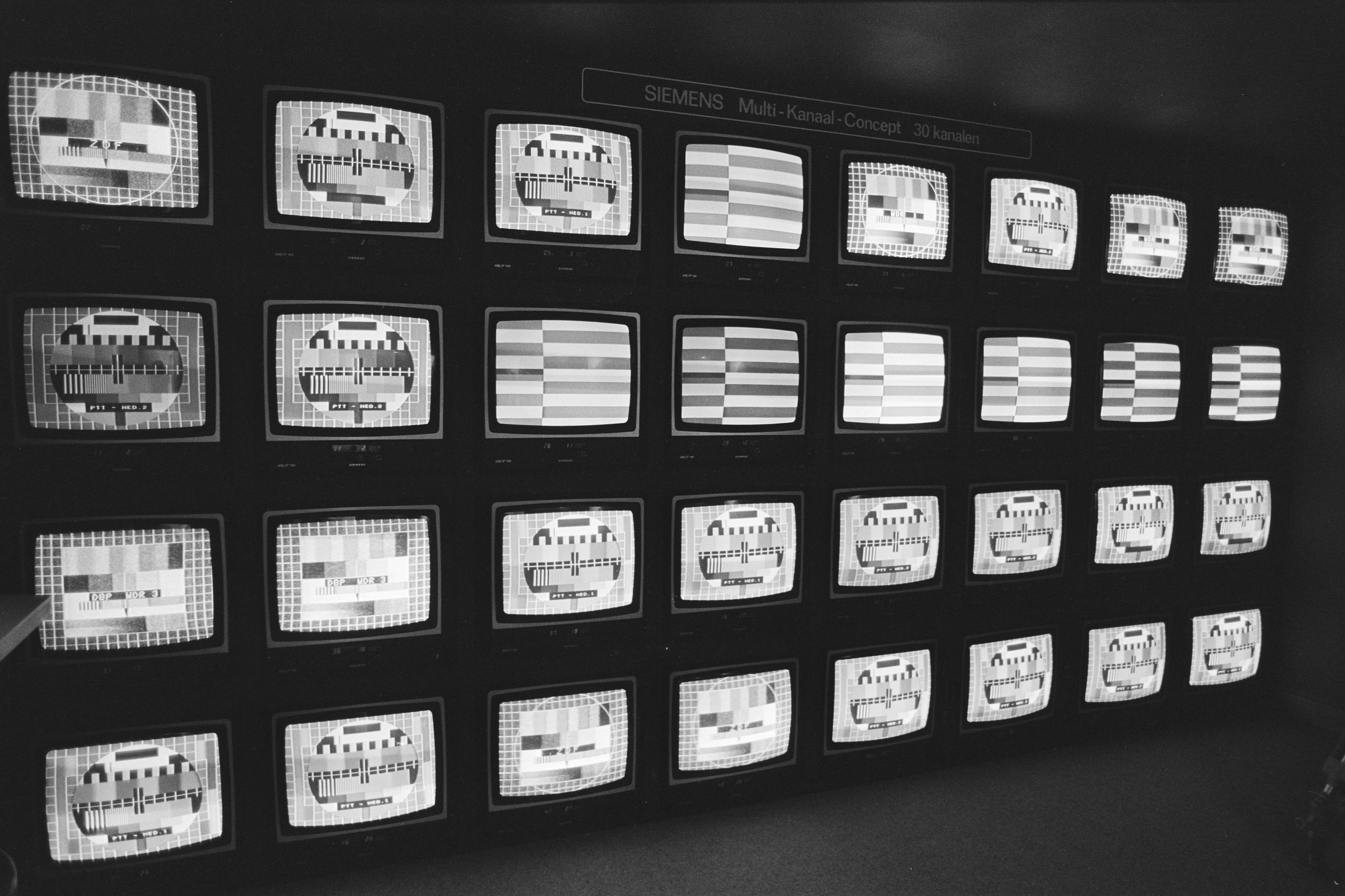
Demonstration of a 30-channel cable TV system in the Netherlands in March 1981.

The very first cable networks were operated locally, notably in 1936 by Rediffusion in London in the United Kingdom and the same year in Berlin in Germany, notably for the Olympic Games, and from 1948 onwards in the United States and Switzerland. This type of local cable network was mainly used to relay terrestrial channels in geographical areas poorly served by terrestrial television signals.

=== In the United States ===
Cable television began in the United States as a commercial business in 1950s.

The early systems simply received weak (broadcast) channels, amplified them, and sent them over unshielded wires to the subscribers, limited to a community or to adjacent communities. The receiving antenna would be taller than any individual subscriber could afford, thus bringing in stronger signals; in hilly or mountainous terrain, it would be placed at a high elevation.

At the outset, cable systems only served smaller communities without television stations of their own, and which could not easily receive signals from stations in cities because of distance or hilly terrain. In Canada, however, communities with their own signals were fertile cable markets, as viewers wanted to receive American signals. Rarely, as in the college town of Alfred, New York, U.S. cable systems retransmitted Canadian channels.

Although early (VHF) television receivers could receive 12 channels (2–13), the maximum number of channels that could be broadcast in one city was 7: channels 2, 4, either 5 or 6, 7, 9, 11 and 13, as receivers at the time were unable to receive strong (local) signals on adjacent channels without distortion. (There were frequency gaps between 4 and 5, and between 6 and 7, which allowed both to be used in the same city).

As equipment improved, all twelve channels could be utilized, except where a local VHF television station broadcast. Local broadcast channels were not usable for signals deemed to be a priority, but technology allowed low-priority signals to be placed on such channels by synchronizing their blanking intervals. TVs were unable to reconcile these blanking intervals and the slight changes due to travel through a medium, causing ghosting. The bandwidth of the amplifiers was also limited, meaning frequencies over 250 MHz were difficult to transmit to distant portions of the coaxial network, and UHF channels could not be used at all. To expand beyond 12 channels, non-standard midband channels had to be used, located between the FM band and Channel 7, or superband beyond Channel 13 up to about 300 MHz; these channels initially were only accessible using separate tuner boxes that sent the chosen channel into the TV set on Channel 2, 3 or 4. Initially, UHF broadcast stations were at a disadvantage because the standard TV sets in use at the time were unable to receive their channels. With the passage of the All-Channel Receiver Act in 1964, all new television sets were required to include a UHF tuner; nonetheless, it would still take a few years for UHF stations to become competitive.

Before being added to the cable box itself, these midband channels were used for early incarnations of pay TV, e.g. The Z Channel (Los Angeles) and HBO but transmitted in the clear i.e. not scrambled as standard TV sets of the period could not pick up the signal nor could the average consumer de-tune the normal stations to be able to receive it.

Once tuners that could receive select mid-band and super-band channels began to be incorporated into standard television sets, broadcasters were forced to either install scrambling circuitry or move these signals further out of the range of reception for early cable-ready TVs and VCRs. However, once consumer sets had the ability to receive all 181 FCC-allocated channels, premium broadcasters were left with no choice but to scramble.

The descrambling circuitry was often published in electronics hobby magazines such as Popular Science and Popular Electronics allowing anybody with anything more than a rudimentary knowledge of broadcast electronics to be able to build their own and receive the programming without cost.

Later, the cable operators began to carry FM radio stations and encouraged subscribers to connect their FM stereo sets to cable. Before stereo and bilingual TV sound became common, Pay-TV channel sound was added to the FM stereo cable line-ups. About this time, operators expanded beyond the 12-channel dial to use the midband and superband VHF channels adjacent to the high band 7–13 of North American television frequencies. Some operators as in Cornwall, Ontario, used a dual distribution network with Channels 2–13 on each of the two cables.

During the 1980s, United States regulations not unlike public, educational, and government access (PEG) created the beginning of cable-originated live television programming. As cable penetration increased, numerous cable-only TV stations were launched, many with their own news bureaus that could provide more immediate and more localized content than that provided by the nearest network newscast.

Such stations may use similar on-air branding as that used by the nearby broadcast network affiliate, but since these stations do not broadcast over the air and are not regulated by the FCC, their call signs are meaningless. These stations evolved partially into today's over-the-air digital subchannels, where a main broadcast TV station would, in the case of no local CBS or ABC station being available, rebroadcast the programming from a nearby affiliate but fill in with its own news and other community programming to suit its own locale. Many live local programs with local interests were subsequently created all over the United States in most major television markets in the early 1980s.

This evolved into today's many cable-only broadcasts of diverse programming, including cable-only produced television movies and miniseries. Cable specialty channels, starting with channels oriented to show movies and large sporting or performance events, diversified further, and narrowcasting became common. By the late 1980s, cable-only signals outnumbered broadcast signals on cable systems, some of which by this time had expanded beyond 35 channels. By the mid-1980s in Canada, cable operators were allowed by the regulators to enter into distribution contracts with cable networks on their own.

In 1987, the American cable television market generated $6,000,000,000 (equivalent to $17,000,000,000 in 2025) in annual revenue. By 1990, American annual cable TV revenue grew to $10,100,000,000 (equivalent to $25,000,000,000 in 2025).

By the 1990s, tiers became common, with customers able to subscribe to different tiers to obtain different selections of additional channels above the basic selection. By subscribing to additional tiers, customers could get specialty channels, movie channels, and foreign channels. Large cable companies used addressable descramblers to limit access to premium channels for customers not subscribing to higher tiers; however, the above magazines often published workarounds for that technology as well.

During the 1990s, the pressure to accommodate the growing array of offerings resulted in digital transmission that made more efficient use of the VHF signal capacity; fibre optics was common to carry signals into areas near the home, where coax could carry higher frequencies over the short remaining distance. Although for a time in the 1980s and 1990s, television receivers and VCRs were equipped to receive the mid-band and super-band channels. Because the descrambling circuitry was for a time present in these tuners, depriving the cable operator of much of their revenue, such cable-ready tuners are rarely used now, requiring a return to the set-top boxes used from the 1970s onward.

The digital television transition in the United States has put all signals, broadcast and cable, into digital form, rendering analog cable television service a rarity, found in an ever-dwindling number of markets. Analog television sets are accommodated, their tuners mostly obsolete and dependent entirely on the set-top box.

== Deployments by continent ==
Cable television is mostly available in North America, Europe, Australia, Asia and South America. Cable television has had little success in Africa, as it is not cost-effective to lay cables in sparsely populated areas. Multichannel multipoint distribution service, a microwave-based system, may be used instead.

== Other cable-based services ==
Coaxial cables are capable of bi-directional carriage of signals as well as the transmission of large amounts of data. Cable television signals use only a portion of the bandwidth available over coaxial lines. This leaves plenty of space available for other digital services such as cable internet, cable telephony and wireless services, using both unlicensed and licensed spectra. Broadband internet access is achieved over coaxial cable by using cable modems to convert the network data into a type of digital signal that can be transferred over coaxial cable. One problem with some cable systems is that the older amplifiers placed along the cable routes are unidirectional; thus, in order to allow for uploading of data, the customer would need to use an analog telephone modem to provide for the upstream connection. This limited the upstream speed to 31.2 kbit/s and prevented the always-on convenience broadband internet typically provides. Many large cable systems have upgraded or are upgrading their equipment to allow for bi-directional signals, thus allowing for greater upload speed and always-on convenience, though these upgrades are expensive.

In North America, Australia and Europe, many cable operators have already introduced cable telephone service, which operates just like existing fixed line operators. This service involves installing a special telephone interface at the customer's premises that converts the analog signals from the customer's in-home wiring into a digital signal, which is then sent on the local loop (replacing the analog last mile, or plain old telephone service (POTS) to the company's switching center, where it is connected to the public switched telephone network (PSTN). The biggest obstacle to cable telephone service is the need for nearly 100% reliable service for emergency calls. One of the standards available for digital cable telephony, PacketCable, seems to be the most promising and able to work with the quality of service (QOS) demands of traditional analog plain old telephone service (POTS) service. The biggest advantage to digital cable telephone service is similar to the advantage of digital cable, namely that data can be compressed, resulting in much less bandwidth used than a dedicated analog circuit-switched service. Other advantages include better voice quality and integration to a Voice over Internet Protocol (VoIP) network, providing cheap or unlimited nationwide and international calling. In many cases, digital cable telephone service is separate from cable modem service being offered by many cable companies and does not rely on Internet Protocol (IP) traffic or the Internet.

Traditional cable television providers and traditional telecommunication companies increasingly compete in providing voice, video and data services to residences. The combination of television, telephone and Internet access is commonly called triple play, regardless of whether CATV or telcos offer it.

== See also ==
- AllVid
- CableCARD
- Cable news
- Closed-circuit television (CCTV), not to be confused with CATV
- DOCSIS
- DVB-C
- European cable television frequencies
- List of cable television companies
- Multichannel television
- North American television frequencies
- Private cable operator
- QAM (television)
- Satellite television
- Society of Cable Telecommunications Engineers
- Switched video
- Tru2way
