= Cable telephony =

Digital telephony over cable TV type networks

Cable telephony is a form of digital telephony over cable TV type networks. A telephone interface installed at the customer's premises converting analog signals from the customer's in-home wiring to a digital signal, which is then sent over the cable connection to the company's Cable television headend switching center. The signal is then sent on to the public switched telephone network (PSTN). Cable telephone provides another revenue stream for cable television system operators and gives the consumer the convenience of combing several services on a single bill - such as paid television, internet and telephone services. At times in the industry this is referred to as "triple play".

== Emergency calls ==
The biggest obstacle to cable telephone service is the need for nearly 100% reliable service for emergency calls. PacketCable, one of the emerging standards being developed for digital cable telephony, seems to be the most promising and able to work with the quality of service demands of traditional analog telephone service.

== Advantage ==
The biggest advantage to digital cable telephone service is similar to the advantage of digital cable television, namely that data can be compressed, resulting in much less bandwidth used than a dedicated analog circuit-switched service. Other advantages include better voice quality and perhaps future integration to a VoIP network providing cheap or unlimited nationwide and international calling. In most cases, digital cable telephone service is separate from broadband Internet access service being offered by many cable companies and does not rely on IP traffic or the Internet.

== Disadvantage ==
One possible disadvantage to digital cable telephone service is similar to a disadvantage of cable Internet access, namely that the medium is shared, which could result in occasional delays and drops when high volumes of bandwidth are used or in some cases shared with entire neighborhoods. These delays could be experienced during the "prime time" parts of the day, when heavy Internet usage and Internet streaming devices can make telephone calls on this system difficult. However, by utilizing Cable Lab's Packet Cable interface specifications, cable operators are able to diminish the effects of heavy internet usage on call quality. This is done by way of QoS provisions present in the Packet Cable specifications.

The second disadvantage it that this service requires power at the subscriber's end. In an emergency, if mains power is lost and without the battery backup unit provided at an additional cost by the cable provider, this telephone service ceases to function. Traditional landline service from phone companies supply phantom power over the communication wires and therefore keep attached devices operational.
