= OpenCable Application Platform =

Java library

The OpenCable Application Platform, or OCAP, is an operating system layer designed for consumer electronics that connect to a cable television system, the Java-based middleware portion of the platform. Unlike operating systems on a personal computer, the cable company controls what OCAP programs run on the consumer's machine. Designed by CableLabs for the cable networks of North America, OCAP programs are intended for interactive services such as eCommerce, online banking, Electronic program guides, and digital video recording. Cable companies have required OCAP as part of the Cablecard 2.0 specification, a proposal that is controversial and has not been approved by the Federal Communications Commission. Cable companies have stated that two-way communications by third party devices on their networks will require them to support OCAP. The Consumer Electronics Association and other groups argue OCAP is intended to block features that compete with cable company provided services and that consumers should be entitled to add, delete and otherwise control programs as on their personal computers. On January 8, 2008 CableLabs announced the Tru2Way brand for the OpenCable platform, including OCAP as the application platform.

== Technical overview ==
OCAP is the Java based software/middleware portion of the OpenCable initiative. OCAP is based on the Globally Executable MHP (GEM)-standard, and was defined by CableLabs. Because OCAP is based on GEM, it has a lot in common with the Multimedia Home Platform (MHP)-standard defined by the DVB project.

At present two versions of the OCAP standard exist:

- OCAP v1.0
- OCAP v2.0

== See also ==
- Downloadable Conditional Access System (DCAS)
- Embedded Java
- Java Platform, Micro Edition
- ARIB
- Interactive digital cable ready
- OEDN
