= Cable television headend =

Facility for cable television system

A cable television headend is a master facility for receiving television signals for processing and distribution over a cable television system. Under Federal Communications Commission regulations, a cable operator must designate a principal headend for regulatory purposes.

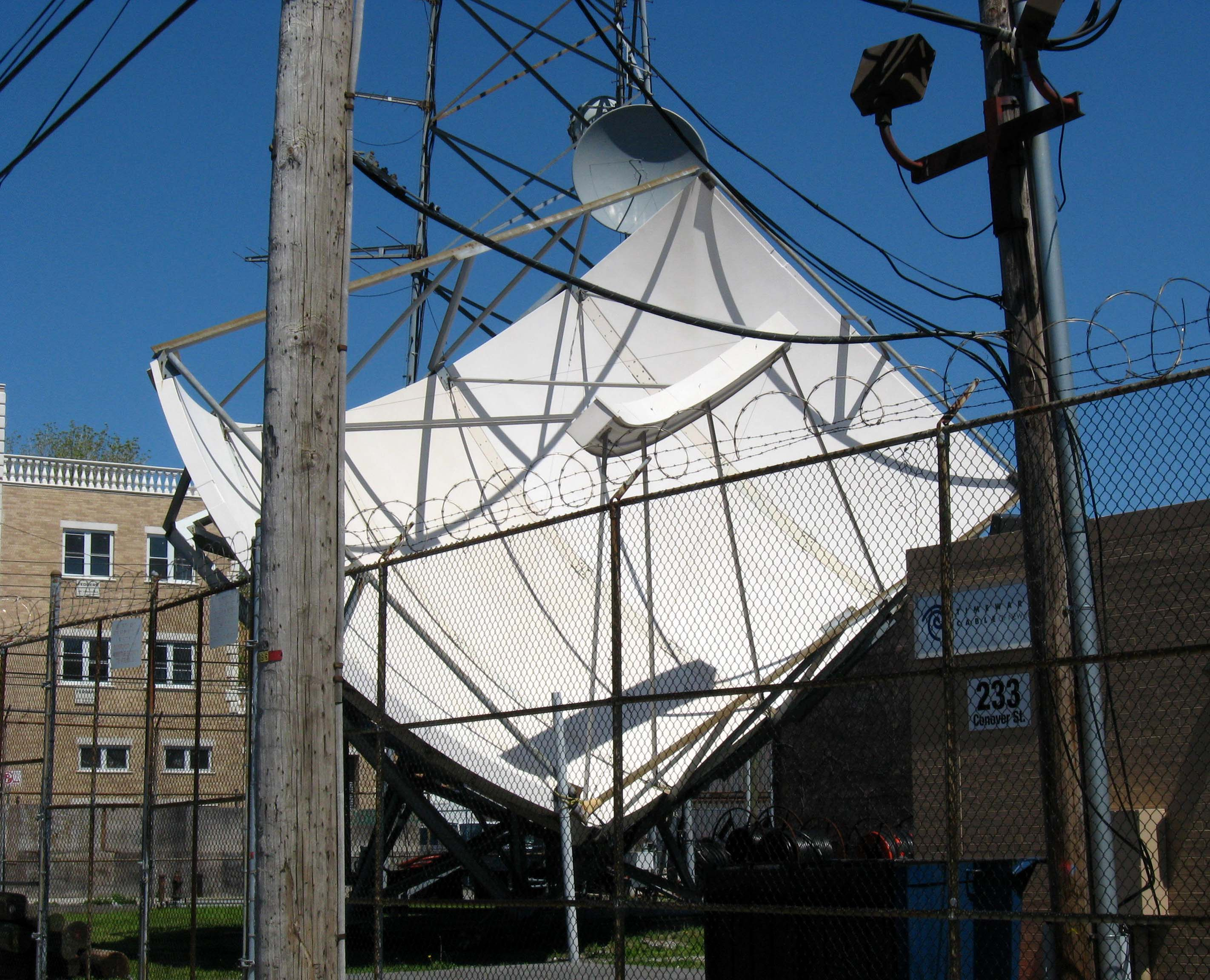
Dish antennas for the South Brooklyn headend of Charter Communications (formerly Time Warner Cable)

A headend facility may be staffed or unstaffed and is typically surrounded by some type of security fencing. The building is typically sturdy and purpose-built to provide security, cooling, and easy access for the electronic equipment used to receive and re-transmit video over the local cable infrastructure. One can also find head ends in power-line communication (PLC) substations and Internet communications networks.

== Reception ==
Nearly all cable TV systems carry subscription content that is relayed from a satellite in geosynchronous orbit. Encrypted to prevent unauthorized use, this content is uplinked from one or more earth stations operated by various content delivery companies. The content is then analog or digitally modulated and transmitted through the cable network (the OSP or "OutSide Plant") to subscriber homes by means of coaxial or fiber-optic cables buried underground or strung from utility poles.

Most cable TV systems also carry local over-the-air television stations for distribution. While each terrestrial channel represents a defined frequency, one or more commercial-grade receiving television antennas are used to receive the multiple channels that the cable company wishes to distribute. These antennas are often built into a single tower structure called a master antenna television structure. Commercial TV pre-amplifiers strengthen the weakened terrestrial TV signals for distribution, usually after re-modulation using a cable-specific analog or digital scheme.

Some cable TV systems receive the local television stations' programming by dedicated coaxial cable, microwave link or fiber-optic line, installed between the local station and the headend. A device called a modulator at the local station's facilities feeds their programming over this line to the cable TV headend, which in turn receives it with another device called a demodulator. It is then distributed through the cable TV headend to subscribers. This is usually more reliable than receiving the local stations' broadcasts over the air with an antenna. However, off-air reception is used as a backup by the headend in case of failure. In some cases systems receive local channels by satellite.

Other sources of programming include those delivered via fiber optics, telephone wires, the Internet, microwave towers and local public-access television channels that are sent to the cable headend on an upstream frequency over the cable system itself (known in the industry as "T"-channels), or via a dedicated line set up by the cable company, as mentioned earlier for reception of local television stations' programming by the headend.

== Signal processing ==
A standard rack-mount headend

Once a television signal is received, it must be processed. For digital satellite TV signals, a dedicated commercial satellite receiver is needed for each channel that is to be distributed by the cable system; these are usually rack-mountable receivers that are designed to take up less space than consumer receivers. They output video and stereo audio signals as well as a digital signal for digital plants.

Analog terrestrial TV signals require a processor which is a RF receiver that outputs video and audio. In some cases the processor will include a built-in modulator.

Digital terrestrial TV signals require a special digital processor.

Digital channels are usually received on an L band QAM stream from a satellite, which uses multiplexing. Using special receivers such as the Motorola MPS, the signal can be demultiplexed or "Demuxed" to extract specific channels from the multiplexed signal. At this point, local insertion may be performed to add content specifically targeted to the local geographic area.

=== Analog Modulation ===
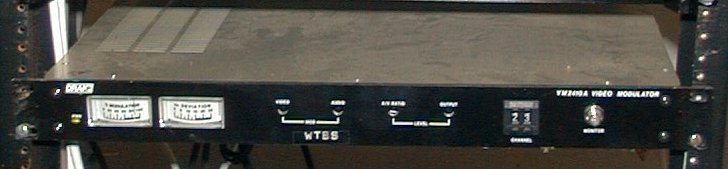
Agile channel modulator

Cable television signals are then mixed in accordance with the cable system's channel numbering scheme using a series of cable modulators (one for each channel), which is in turn fed into a frequency multiplexer or signal combiner. The mixed signals are sent into a broadband amplifier, then sent into the cable system by the trunk line and continuously re-amplified as needed.

Modulators essentially take an input signal and attach it to a specific frequency. For example, in North America, NTSC standards dictate that CH2 is a 6 MHz wide channel with its luminance carrier at 55.25 MHz, so the modulator for channel 2 will impose the appropriate input signal on to the 55.25 MHz frequency to be received by any TV tuned to Channel 2.

=== Digital Modulation ===
Digital channels are modulated as well; however, instead of each channel being modulated on to a specific frequency, multiple digital channels are modulated on to one specific frequency. Using QAM (Quadrature Amplitude Modulation), a CATV operator can place usually up to eight subchannels on each channel so channel 2 may actually be carrying channels 1–8 in a viewer's city. Set-top boxes (STBs) or CableCards are required to receive these digital signals and are provided by the cable operator themselves.

Many modern cable systems are now "all digital" meaning analog video signals have been discontinued in order to reuse spectrum. The RF channels analog used to occupy are now open for a cable system to reuse as digital video or High Speed Data (commonly referred to in the industry as "HSD") channels to increase subscriber download/upload internet speeds. (see DOCSIS) Analog video removal also essentially eliminates cable theft since analog signals were transmitted unencrypted. Most digital video signals are compressed to MPEG-2 and MPEG-4 formats in order to combine multiple video streams into a QAM making the most efficient use of spectrum which a customer cable set top box receives, demodulates, de-encrypts and displays as a virtual channel number that the viewer recognizes. In many cases the same TV network may appear multiple times in a local channel lineup as a different channel the viewer sees (I.E. CNN as 34, 334, 1034) this is due to previous generations of channel lineups kept in service and intended to not confuse viewers who are familiar with the network appearing on a number they are used to. Although a channel may be in a line up multiple times the RF QAM it is combined or "muxed" into is modulated and compressed just once. A set top box tunes to that same QAM when any instance of that network is called by the viewer. Virtual channeling also allows the cable operator to change the physical frequency a QAM is on without the viewer noticing the channel number changing in their lineup.

Most digital cable systems encrypt their signals (both data and video) to eliminate unauthorized reception.

== National Video Transporting ==
=== Super Headend ===
Most commonly in large nationwide cable systems a central or "super headend" is in service to feed a local hub via a fiber optic transport circuit. In some cases a single super headend could service a cable company's entire service footprint. Super headends allow for a single site of satellite dishes that can be placed in optimal locations for satellite coverage and signal strength, usually in areas of high ground elevation and open terrain. In large cable systems, a provider may operate multiple super headends as a way of redundancy in the event of a failure. Super headends also create a cost-effective environment for cable operators as the amount of equipment and faculties is greatly reduced and the signals can be replicated and transmitted to local hubs that feed a community or city.

=== Market Center Headend ===
In some large nationwide cable systems, a sort of median point between a large super headend and local hub exists and is known as a market center headend or region headend. Typically a market center headend receives its national video content from the super headend, then forwards that alongside local ad splicing and local channels to local hubs. Market center headends are regularly staffed while hubs are not (outside of normal maintenance and servicing). A main benefit of a market center headend is it can give more attention to local service and details than a nationwide super headend could. For example, a market center headend allows for engineers to pull local video feeds such as public access channels and local channels for viewing and analyzation of video quality defects when such an issue may not be immediately noticed locally. Another benefit is the quick action of channel blackouts in certain areas during times of carriage contract disputes with broadcasters. Market center headends can service hubs in a large city, an entire state or even multiple states.

== Cable Hubs and Nodes ==
A cable hub is a building or shelter usually smaller than a headend that takes an already processed video signal from a headend and transmits it to a local community. (or multiple communities) Most cable hubs are used in conjunction with an HFC Plant. Combined IP video and data enters a hub via a microwave or fiber optic transport circuit and gets routed to QAM devices such as a cable modem termination system which changes the IP data into a RF QAM to be combined with other services (such as video on demand, switched video) and transmitted to the subscriber. The RF from each service gets combined in the hub to ultimately a single coax cable broken down per node, but right before it leaves the hub to feed customers, gets changed to fiber optic light to feed local cable nodes which may cover a large building, a neighborhood or in rural areas, an entire community. The cable node located in the field in-turn reverses the optical light from the hub and changes the signals back to RF over coaxial cable. This is called a "forward" path (download). The inverse happens on the upload or "return" path as customers transmit data back to a hub. Cable nodes were initially intended to reduce amplifier cascade and improve signal quality to subscribers distant from a hub. Modern cable nodes still serve the same purpose for amplifier cascade reduction, but now are strategically placed in areas of high data density to better allocate bandwidth availability and reduce oversubscription in a particular area. Cable nodes also allow for multiple channel lineups or public access markets out of the same hub.

=== Local Channel Receiving ===
Since a super headend feeding a hub may be located out of market, a hub may also be equipped with an antenna tower and off-air antennas to receive the local channels in that particular market. The local channels received at that hub then get distributed to other hubs in the area. Depending on its geographic footprint and location, a hub may also receive local channels from neighbouring markets and combine them with the immediate market giving viewers from that particular hub multi-market programming, which the cable company may black out certain programming per carriage contract and FCC regulations. A cable system may build a fibre optic circuit as a primary path to a local television station as an additional mean to bring its programming into a cable system and utilise the off-air antennas as a backup.

== OTN Hub ==
OTN (Optical Terminal Node) hubs are usually a remote site spawning from a larger hub, located in and intended to serve rural communities and are equipped with just HFC combining equipment for a limited number of optical nodes in the community. An OTN's primary purpose is to extend the HFC cable plant to rural communities without having to locate on site, core network equipment such as a CMTS or video edge QAM devices. The OTN relies on the parent hub (where the core network equipment is actually located) to provide the video and HSD services to its area. An OTN is commonly a small shelter or building containing just a few equipment racks.

=== Transporting Services to an OTN ===
Since core network equipment (CMTS, video edge devices, core router/switches) are not located within the OTN itself, HSD and video services are multiplexed and transmitted to the OTN from the parent hub over a RF-to-fiber link. At the OTN, the individual services get de-multiplexed and connected into the OTN's forward/return combining plant for distribution to the community. OTNs also allow rual communities to be served with the same tier of service urban communities can receive without the cable operator having to invest large amounts of money on additional fiber construction and networking equipment for only a limited number of potential customers.

- See also
- Cable modem termination system
- List of cable television companies
- North American broadcast television frequencies
- North American cable television frequencies
- Point of presence
