= Digital cable =

Distribution of cable television using digital data and video compression

Digital cable is the distribution of cable television using digital data and video compression. The technology was first developed by General Instrument. By 2000, most cable companies offered digital features, eventually replacing their previous analog-based cable by the mid 2010s. During the late 2000s, broadcast television converted to the digital HDTV standard, which was incompatible with existing analog cable systems.

In addition to providing high-definition video, digital cable systems provide more services such as pay-per-view programming, cable internet access and cable telephone services. Most digital cable signals are encrypted, which reduced the incidence of cable television piracy that occurred in analog systems.

== History ==
In 1990, General Instrument (acquired by Motorola and now owned by ARRIS Group) demonstrated that it was possible to use digital compression to deliver high quality HDTV in a standard 6 MHz television channel. Using the same technology General Instrument (GI) demonstrated the digital transmission of multiple high-quality standard definition programs in a 6 MHz cable channel.

In the 1990s, cable providers began to invest heavily in this new multi-channel digital TV technology to expand the number of channels and services available to subscribers. Increased competition and programming choices from direct-broadcast satellite services such as DirecTV, Dish Network, and PrimeStar caused cable providers to seek new ways to provide more programming. Customers were increasingly interested in more channels, pay-per-view programming, digital music services, and high-speed internet services. By 2000, most cable providers in the US were offering some form of digital cable TV to their customers.

Digital cable technology has allowed cable providers to compress video channels so that they take up less bandwidth and to offer two-way communication capabilities. This has enabled providers to offer more channels, video-on-demand services that don't require a separate telephone line, telephone services, high-speed internet services, and interactive television services. Digital cable implements error correction to ensure the integrity of the received signal and uses a secure digital distribution system (i.e., a secure encrypted signal to prevent eavesdropping and theft of service.)

Most digital cable providers use QAM for video services and DOCSIS standards for data services. Some providers have also begun to roll out video services using IPTV or Switched video.

== Channels ==
Digital cable technology can allow many TV channels to occupy the frequency space that would normally be occupied by a single analog cable TV channel. The number of channels placed on a single analog frequency depends on the compression used. Many cable providers are able to fit about 10 digital SD channels or 2 digital HD channels on a single analog channel frequency. Some providers are able to squeeze more channels onto a single frequency with higher compression, but often this can cause the video quality of the channel to degrade.

The addition of this capability complicates the notion of a "channel" in digital cable (as well as in over-the-air ATSC digital broadcasts). The formal names for the two numbers that now identify a channel are the physical channel and the subchannel.

The physical channel is a number corresponding to a specific 6 MHz frequency range. See: North American cable television frequencies.

The subchannel is a logical channel of data within the physical channel. Technically, there can be up to 1024 subchannels in a physical channel, though in practice only a few are used (as the bandwidth must be divided among all the subchannels).

There are two ways providers try to make this easier for consumers. The first, accomplished through PSIP, is where program and channel information is broadcast along with the video, allowing the consumer's decoder (set-top box or display) to automatically identify the many channels and subchannels. The second (also accomplished through PSIP) is that, in an effort to hide subchannels entirely, many cable companies map virtual channel numbers to underlying physical and sub-channels. For example, a cable company might call channel 5-1 "channel 732" and channel 5-2 "channel 733". This also allows the cable company to change the frequency of a channel without changing what the customer sees as a channel number. In such arrangements, the physical/sub-channel numbers are called the "QAM channel", and the alternative channel designation is called the "mapped channel", "virtual channel", or simply "channel".

In theory, a set-top box can decode the PSIP information from every channel it receives and use that information to build the mapping between QAM channel and virtual channel. However, cable companies do not always reliably transmit PSIP information. Alternatively, CableCards receive the channel mapping and can communicate that to the set-top box.

== Technical information ==
The standard for signal transmission over digital cable television systems in the United States is now fixed as both 64-QAM and 256-QAM (quadrature amplitude modulation), which is specified in SCTE 07, and is part of the DVB standard (but not ATSC). This method carries 38.47 Mbit/s using 256-QAM on a 6 MHz channel, which can carry nearly two full ATSC 19.39 Mbit/s transport streams. Each 6-MHz channel is typically used to carry 7–12 digital SDTV channels (256-QAM, MPEG2 MP/ML streams of 3–5 Mbit/s). On many boxes with QAM tuners (most notably the DVR boxes), high-definition versions of local channels and some cable channels are available.

Digital cable allows for the broadcast of EDTV (480p) as well as HDTV (720p, 1080i, and 1080p). By contrast, analog cable transmits programs solely in the 480i format (the lowest television definition in use today).

The Advanced Television Systems Committee standards include a provision for 16-VSB transmission over cable at 38.4 Mbit/s, but the encoding has not yet gained wide acceptance. Some SMATV systems may carry 8-VSB and QAM signals, mostly in apartment buildings and similar facilities that use a combination of terrestrial antennas and cable distribution sources (such as HITS or "Headend in the Sky", a unit of Comcast that delivers digital channels by satellite to small cable systems).

Digital cable channels typically are allocated above 552 MHz, the upper frequency of cable channel 78. (Cable channels above channel 13 are at lower frequencies than UHF broadcast channels with the same number, as seen in North American cable television frequencies.) Between 552 and 750 MHz, there is space for 33 6-MHz channels (231–396 SDTV channels); when going all the way to 864 MHz, there is space for 52 6-MHz channels (364–624 SDTV channels).

In the U.S., digital cable systems with 750 MHz or greater activated channel capacity are required to comply with a set of SCTE and CEA standards. Until September 4, 2020, these companies were also required to provide CableCARDs to customers that requested them.

== See also ==
- Cable Internet access
- Cable television in the United States
- CableCARD
- Digital television
- Direct-broadcast satellite
- DVB-C
- DigiCipher 2
- QAM Tuner
- Significantly viewed
- Tru2way
