= Switched video =

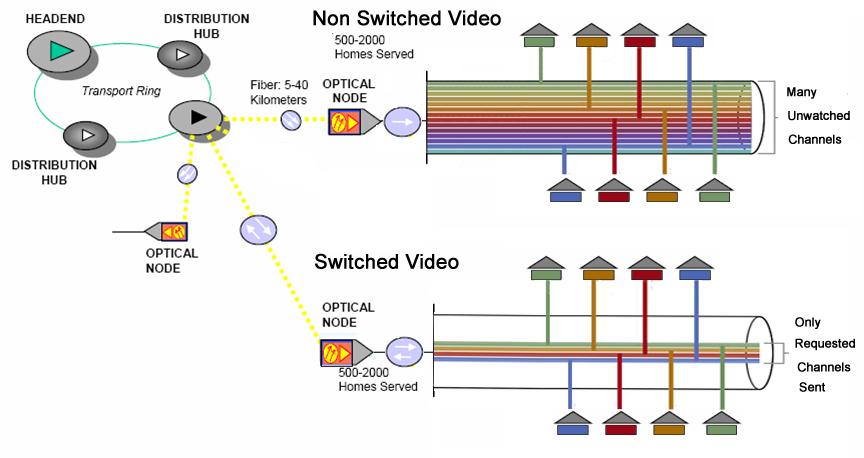
How switched video works in a cable company's last mile compared to a conventional network.

Switched video or switched digital video (SDV), sometimes referred to as switched broadcast (SWB), is a telecommunications industry term for a network scheme for distributing digital video via a cable. Switched video sends the digital video more efficiently freeing bandwidth. The scheme applies to digital video distribution both on typical cable TV systems using QAM channels, or on IPTV systems.

== Description ==
In hybrid fibre-coaxial systems, a fiber optic network extending from the operator's head end carries video channels out to a fiber optic node that services up to 2000 end points. Video is then sent via coaxial cable. Note that only a percentage of these homes are actively watching channels at a given time. Rarely are all channels being accessed by the homes in the service group.

In a switched video system, the unwatched channels do not need to be sent.

In US cable systems, equipment in the home sends a channel request signal back to the distribution hub. If a channel is requested, the distribution hub allocates a QAM channel and transmits the channel to the coaxial cable. For this to work, the home equipment must have two-way communication ability. Switched video uses the same mechanisms as video on demand and may be viewed as non-ending video on demand that users share.

== Technical ==
Two-way communication is handled differently between cable and IPTV schemes. IPTV uses Internet communication protocols but requires a different distribution infrastructure. US cable companies elected the less costly approach of upgrading existing infrastructure. In the upgrade approach, various proprietary schemes use specific frequencies for messaging the distribution hub.

For switched video to work on cable systems, digital television users in a subscription group must have devices capable of communicating to the distribution hub in a compatible manner. Unlike other features dependent on two-way communication such as video on demand, the requirement to upgrade all digital set-top boxes within a group makes conversion to switched video expensive. CableLabs proposed in the CableCARD 2.0 specification that two-way communication be supported with a scheme that required more powerful hardware capable of running Java software. Many cable companies indicated they would build lower cost devices that do not require this OCAP programming environment, so that upgrading to switched video would not be as costly. Consumer electronics companies also prefer a lighter weight solution, and so absent a standard, the conversion to switched video may require many years.

== History ==
BigBand Networks (acquired by Arris Group in 2011) was the switched video pioneer, and received the Technology & Engineering Emmy Award in 2008 for innovation in the HFC market.

Major vendors like Arris Group and Cisco also provide SDV solutions for the cable operators. An emerging market supplies back office applications to analyze and control performance.

== See also ==
- Cable television
- Internet Protocol television
- Quadrature amplitude modulation
