= Cable television piracy =

Obtaining unauthorized access to cable television services

Cable television piracy is a form of copyright infringement through the act of obtaining unauthorized access to cable television services. In the United States, reception of cable television without authorization by a cable operator is forbidden by both federal and state laws. In Missouri, cable television piracy is usually a class A misdemeanor; if the service is $500 or more, it is classified as a class C felony.

== Methods ==
In older analog cable systems, most cable channels were not encrypted and cable theft was often as easy as plugging a coaxial cable attached to the user's television into an apartment building's cable distribution box, which were often unlocked. In some rural areas, non-subscribers would run long cables to distribution boxes on nearby utility poles. Set-top boxes were required with some systems, but these were generic, and often in an unknowing violation of contract, former customers would donate them to thrift stores for sale or retain them indefinitely in storage when they ended their subscription to the service rather than return them to the provider.

Other ways of cable theft were using a cable TV converter box (also known as a descrambler or "black box") to steal all channels and decrypt pay-per-view events, whereas a normal converter would only decrypt the ones paid for by the customer. The cable companies could send an electronic signal, called a "bullet", that would render illegal descramblers inoperative, though some were bulletproof. The boxes also would often be ordered from overseas or given to customers by illicit third-party installers of cable television.

=== Prevention ===
To prevent this, cable providers built stronger protection against theft into new digital cable systems that were deployed beginning in the mid-1990s as part of the changeover to the new digital HDTV standard, along with assessing a large fine for the entire cost of a set-top box if the customer didn't return it upon the termination of services. This has greatly reduced cable theft, although pirate decryption continued on some DVB-C systems that are based on the same compromised encryption schemes formerly used in satellite television broadcasting. Sometimes an advertisement advertising a free product or service only users illegally descrambling premium services could see would be sent out, which allowed law enforcement to catch the people who called about it.

As of 2018, many cable providers have switched to digital-only systems that require mandatory use of either their approved set top boxes or an approved CableCARD device. In many cases, no analog channels are available, and if they are, are usually just the provider's paid programming, Emergency Alert System and barker channels, or merely a one-channel signal that lets a customer or installer know the signal is viewable on a television set. Channels and programming may also be available through digital media player devices such as the Roku or Apple TV (along with tablets and smartphones) via provider apps, which confirm subscriber eligibility through a private internal IP network and require an on-network connection to the provider (including disallowing connections to outside virtual private network services to emulate a home network connection elsewhere), making any piracy through that venue virtually impossible.

== Digital cable systems ==
In most modern digital cable systems the signals are encrypted, so cases of people obtaining illegal service are less common. The subscriber requires a set-top box provided by the cable company to decrypt and receive the cable signal. Unlike the older analog set-top boxes, the digital set-top box will not function until the cable company activates it by sending it a unique activation key through the cable, which is sent only after the subscriber signs up. Each set-top box is individually addressable, so a given box can be deactivated by command from the company if the subscriber fails to pay their bill (this is sometimes colloquially referred to as a "bullet"). A box only decrypts the channel being watched, so each box can only be used with one television, requiring subscribers to lease additional boxes at greater expense for multiple televisions.

One minor loophole is that the cable company has no way of knowing where a given set-top box is located, and once activated a box will function anywhere in the local cable system. Subscribers are often provided with several set-top boxes as part of their subscription, and can give or sell unneeded activated boxes to neighboring nonsubscribers who can use them in their own residences, though a provider using IP location using the cable modem within a set-top box featuring advanced two-way features can avert this situation.

This system is dependent on the security of the encryption system chosen by the cable company in question. Old cable equipment used an analog signal that was scrambled by tuning the signal so the picture was unsteady, just as Macrovision does at an attempt to copy a video. The equipment would descramble the signal so that it can be viewed by the subscriber. It also is addressable, meaning that it can be remotely controlled by the company's technical staff. The first major case covered by the media was when 317 subscribers were caught in 1991 when the company they subscribed sent a "bullet" (a video signal that turns off the equipment) to their cable boxes. The boxes were modified, but possibly belonged to the cable company.

== See also ==
- BeoutQ
- Broadcast encryption
- Pirate decryption
- Television encryption
- Theft of services
- Homer vs. Lisa and the 8th Commandment
- The Baby Shower (Seinfeld)
