= Tru2way =

Digital cable service brand

Tru2way is a brand name for interactive digital cable services delivered over the cable network. Services include interactive program guides, interactive ads, games, chat, web browsing, and T-Commerce. The brand also appears as <Tru2way> and is used to market cable services, applications, and devices that support the Tru2way cable architecture. Tru2way is the successor name for technology known as OpenCable. Major cable operators committed to deploy the Tru2way platform in service areas covering more than 90 million U.S. homes by the end of 2008.

In 2010, the FCC issued a notice of inquiry for a successor system to both Tru2way and CableCARD, called AllVid, and has stated "We are not convinced that the Tru2way solution will assure the development of a commercial retail market as directed by Congress."

== Design ==
The service requires a digital television (DTV) that supports Tru2way and a CableCard port (for the decryption codes) but not a set-top box. Tru2way compatibility combines the interactive features of the STB into the television.

CableLabs, the industry's research and development arm, licenses the brand to cable companies and cable programmers that deliver Tru2way applications and services, as well as consumer electronics (CE) manufacturers that build devices that support such applications and services. Use of the mark requires CableLabs certification testing for conformance to the Tru2way specifications (also known as the OpenCable Host 2.1 Specifications).

Tru2way includes a middleware technology built into televisions, set-top boxes, digital video recorders and other devices. Because the middleware is based on Java technology, it enables cable companies and other interactive application developers to write applications once and run them on any device that supports the Tru2way architecture.

== History ==
=== Development ===
In 2003, the US Federal Communications Commission (FCC) adopted unidirectional (from the cable system to the customer device) CableCARD standards based on a MOU between the National Cable & Telecommunications Association (NCTA) and the Consumer Electronics Association (CEA). The FCC assumed that the NCTA and CES would negotiate another agreement to achieve bidirectional compatibilities, such as interactive programming guides, video-on-demand and pay-per-view, since retail CableCARD-ready devices are unable to access such systems. After the FCC realized they weren't leading to an agreement, they issued the Two-Way FNPRM in June 2007 seeking comment on competing proposals. In the wake of the Two-Way FNPRM, the six largest cable operators and consumer electronics manufacturers negotiated a CableCARD-based agreement (Tru2way) in 2008. In the FCC's 2010 AllVid notice of inquiry, the FCC stated "We are not convinced that the Tru2way solution will assure the development of a commercial retail market as directed by Congress."

=== Deployment ===
Panasonic and Comcast announced a Tru2way trial to begin 27 October 2008 in Chicago, Denver, Northern Colorado and Colorado Springs. Abt Electronics and Ultimate Electronics offered a choice of 42" and 50" Panasonic Plasma televisions using Tru2way in these Comcast cable systems. These televisions went on sale for consumer purchase on 27 October 2008, but had to be installed professionally by the retailers' installation group.

In May 2008, Advanced Digital Broadcast (ADB) was the first set-top-box manufacturer to receive full Tru2way certification for their ADB-4820C Set-Back Box.

In June 2008, six major cable companies signed a "binding" memorandum of understanding (MOU) to have all of their digital cable systems ready for Tru2way by July 1, 2009. At the time none of those systems were ready to implement Tru2way.

In October 2009, Rogers, one of Canada's largest cable television providers, stated they were not interested in the Tru2way platform because it was not based on open standards. Rogers stated they were considering a more Internet-oriented interactive platform.

In December 2009, Vidéotron, Quebec's largest cable television provider, announced a partnership with Samsung to implement Canada's first Tru2way service.

In July 2010, Panasonic was the sole device manufacturer producing Tru2way compatible televisions. They then stated that they would no longer sell Tru2way compatible televisions.

== See also ==
- AllVid
- CableCARD
- OpenCable Application Platform (OCAP)
- OEDN
