= QAM (television) =

Digital television standard

QAM is a digital television standard using quadrature amplitude modulation. It is the format by which digital cable channels are encoded and transmitted via cable television providers. QAM is used in a variety of communications systems such as Dial-up modems and Wi-Fi. In cable systems, a QAM tuner is linked to the cable in a manner that is equivalent to an ATSC tuner which is required to receive over-the-air (OTA) digital channels broadcast by local television stations when attached to an antenna. Most new HDTV digital televisions support both of these standards. QAM uses the same 6 MHz bandwidth as ATSC, using a standard known as ITU-T Recommendation J.83 Annex B ("J.83b").

== Technical details ==
QAM is a modulation format and does not specify the format of the digital data being carried. However, when used in the context of US digital cable television, the format of the data transmitted using this modulation is based on ITU-T J.83 Annex B ("J.83b"). This is in contrast to DVB-C which is also based on QAM modulation, but uses a DVB-based data format which is incompatible with North American receivers.

QAM is a parallel form of modulation that transmits two independent signals at a symbol rate that is near, but less than, the bandwidth of 6 MHz. VSB modulation, on the other hand, is a serial form of modulation that transmits one independent signal at a symbol rate that is near, but less than, twice the bandwidth of 6 MHz. The two can be related by the fact that a VSB signal can be shown to be a form of offset QAM modulation where one of the two independent signals is delayed by 1/2 a symbol duration. The 8-VSB modulation in the ATSC system corresponds with the 64-QAM modulation of J.83b. In a 6 MHz channel, the data rate is at most 36 Mbit/s (for 64-QAM or 8-VSB); the 8-VSB ATSC achieves a data rate of 19.392 Mbit/s while the 64-QAM J.83b achieves a data rate of 26.970 Mbit/s. While both systems use concatenated trellis/RS coding, the differences in symbol rate and FEC redundancy account for the differences in rate. In addition, J.83b defines a popular 256-QAM mode that achieves a data rate of 38.8 Mbit/s.

Many cable providers offer few or no details about unencrypted QAM channels. It is also common for cable providers to falsely insist that a set-top box from the cable company is required to watch all digital cable channels, including unencrypted channels, even though some unencrypted QAM channels may be distributed via their system. QAM channels may move without notification and some channels may have strange numbering schemes when received on a non-proprietary set-top box.

== QAM tuners ==
In North American digital video, a QAM tuner is a device present in some digital televisions and similar devices which enables direct reception of digital cable channels without the use of a set-top box. An integrated QAM tuner allows the free reception of unscrambled digital programming sent "in the clear" by cable providers, usually local broadcast stations, cable radio channels, or in the case of providers which have transitioned to do so, Public-access television cable TV channels. Which channels are scrambled varies greatly from location to location and can change over time; the majority of digital channels are scrambled because the providers consider them to be extra-cost options and not part of the "basic cable" package. The FCC mandates that all new TVs sold in the US must include an ATSC tuner, but there are no requirements for QAM tuning functionality. Vizio attempted to sell tunerless displays in the late 2010s (which were sold technically as large-screen monitors), but quickly backed away from that strategy after major consumer complaints.

== ClearQAM ==
ClearQAM (unencrypted) lets cable subscribers avoid industry-provided set-top boxes (necessary for decoding encrypted basic cable signals).

Cable operators with all-digital systems may encrypt their services.
