= Society of Cable Telecommunications Engineers =

- Formation: 1969
- Founded: 1969
- Type: Professional Organization
- Purpose: Cable Telecommunications Engineering
- Headquarters: 140 Philips Road, Exton, Pennsylvania 1934
- Method: Professional Development, Industry Standards, Professional Certification Programs, Publications, and Trade Events
- Members: 25,000+
- Website: https://www.scte.org/

The Society of Cable Telecommunications Engineers (SCTE) a subsidiary of CableLabs^{®} is a non-profit professional association for accelerating the deployment of technology, technical standards and workforce development education related to cable telecommunications engineering and operations. Founded in 1969 as The Society of Cable Television Engineers, SCTE, has a current membership of more than 25,000 individuals.

== Publications ==
SCTE a subsidiary of CableLabs offers several publications to its membership. These include Interval, a monthly member newsletter covering association events, training, activities, and member accomplishments, Broadband Library, a quarterly magazine, and SCTE Standards Bulletin, a quarterly printed newsletter covering the SCTE standards program.

Former publications included SCTE Credentials, a quarterly electronic newsletter highlighting SCTE's certification program.

== Events ==
SCTE TechExpo is a three-day conference focused on engineering that includes educational workshops, exhibits, and professional networking opportunities. During SCTE TechExpo the technical forum is conducted in partnership with CableLabs and the Internet & Television Association (NCTA). Annual attendance is approximately 10,000+ individuals. SCTE TechExpo is the largest telecommunication event in the Americas. In 2023, SCTE celebrated its 40th anniversary for Expo.

=== Past and upcoming events ===
- SCTE Cable-Tec Expo 2010 October 20–22, 2010; New Orleans, Louisiana
- SCTE Cable-Tec Expo 2011 November 15–17, 2011; Atlanta, Georgia
- SCTE Cable-Tec Expo 2012 October 17–19, 2012; Orlando, Florida
- SCTE Cable-Tec Expo 2013 October 21–24, 2013; Atlanta, Georgia
- SCTE Cable-Tec Expo 2014 September 22–25, 2014; Denver, Colorado
- SCTE Cable-Tec Expo 2015 October 13–16, 2015; New Orleans, Louisiana
- SCTE Cable-Tec Expo 2016 September 26–29, 2016; Philadelphia, Pennsylvania
- SCTE Cable-Tec Expo 2017 October 17–20, 2017; Denver, Colorado
- SCTE Cable-Tec Expo 2018 October 22–25, 2018; Atlanta, Georgia
- SCTE Cable-Tec Expo 2019 September 30 - October 3, 2019; New Orleans, Louisiana
- SCTE Cable-Tec Expo 2020 October 12–15, 2020; Virtual
- SCTE Cable-Tec Expo 2021 October 11–15, 2021; Virtual
- SCTE Cable-Tec Expo 2022 September 19–23, 2023; Philadelphia, Pennsylvania
- SCTE Cable-Tec Expo 2023 October 16–19, 2023; Denver, Colorado
- SCTE TechExpo 2024 September 24–26, 2024; Atlanta, Georgia
- SCTE TechExpo 2025 September 29 - October 1, 2025; Washington, DC

== Standards program ==
SCTE includes a standards program for the development of technical specifications supporting the cable telecommunications industry. The work program includes: data and telephony over cable; application platform development; digital video; emergency alert systems (EMS); energy management; network monitoring systems; cables, connectors and amplifiers; and construction and maintenance practices. In 2016 SCTE created an Internet of Things working group within the standards program. A Generic access platform (GAP) working group was created in 2018.

SCTE is accredited by the American National Standards Institute (ANSI), recognized by the International Telecommunication Union (ITU), and works in cooperation with the European Telecommunications Standards Institute (ETSI). More than 130 MSOs, vendors, and allied organizations are SCTE Standards members.

== Chapters ==
SCTE chapters play a crucial role in connecting and educating professionals in the broadband industry. With over 60 chapters worldwide, these local groups serve as hubs for technical knowledge, networking, and professional development.

== Awards ==
SCTE was announced in 2022 as a recipient of a Technology & Engineering Emmy Award for its development of the "Event Scheduling and Notification Interface (ESNI) standard SCTE 224". SCTE was awarded the Emmy alongside CableLabs and the Open Authentication Technology Committee (OATC).

SCTE was announced in 2021 as a recipient of a Technology & Engineering Emmy Award for its development of "Event Signaling and Management (ESAM) and Application Programming Interface (API) standard (SCTE 250)".

SCTE was announced in 2012 as a recipient of a Technology & Engineering Emmy Award from the National Academy of Television Arts & Sciences for “Local Cable Ad Insertion Technology – Cable Digital Standards for Local Cable Advertising.”
