= AllVid =

Proposed television technology

AllVid was a proposal to develop technology enabling smart broadband-connected video devices to access the content on the managed networks of cable operators, telcos, and satellite-TV operators. It was initially proposed in the U.S. Federal Communications Commission's (FCC) National Broadband Plan in 2010. The AllVid hardware would act as a universal adapter for all types of pay TV content such as video-on-demand and pay-per-view, as well as interactive programming guides, delivered through a wide variety of means, including cable TV, satellite TV, VDSL, IPTV, and Internet TV.

AllVid was intended to replace CableCARD. Unlike CableCARD rules which only applied to cable operators, AllVid would apply to all Multichannel Video Programming Distributors (MVPDs) including satellite and telco companies.

As of January 2017, AllVid was never adopted or developed.

== Design ==
The FCC has proposed several design aspects to AllVid while soliciting feedback from interested parties on a final specification before going forward for rulemaking. Major elements of the FCC's AllVid proposal include:

- Gateway device capable of decoding six video streams and feeding through a home network to various devices.
- Adapter device capable of decoding two video streams and feeding directly to a television or consumer electronics device.
- Physical connection using 100BASE-TX Ethernet.
- Internet Protocol as a communications protocol between the AllVid gateway and end devices.
- Encryption and authentication using the DTCP-IP standard used by the Digital Living Network Alliance.
- Content ordering and billing for VOD and PPV services may be handled via gateway generated screens but additional options are requested.
- Service discovery may use Universal Plug and Play, as suggested by TiVo, but other proposals are invited.
- Content encoding is proposed to support multiple codecs to allow devices flexibility in choice of video formats without requiring transcoding by the gateway.

== Responses ==
Google has supported the AllVid proposal, stating that "Google supports an all-video ('AllVid') solution like the one put forth in the NOI. Consumers would be well-served by having such an inexpensive universal adapter available at retail, which would feature an easy-to-use, common interface, and employ nationwide interoperability standards to connect to televisions, digital video recording devices ('DVRs'), and other smart video devices. These navigation devices effectively would separate the network interface from the device functionality, making video more 'portable' across platforms and devices."

The AllVid proposal has been criticized by the Motion Picture Association of America for providing insufficient protection against copyright infringement by unauthorized multichannel video programming distributors and by AT&T for preempting market forces already underway.

== Industry alliance ==
On February 16, 2011 several companies announced the creation of the AllVid Tech Company Alliance. This group works to support implementation of the AllVid standard and specifically addresses issues raised by the National Cable Television Association (NCTA). Alliance members include:

- Best Buy Co., Inc.
- Google Inc.
- Mitsubishi Digital Electronics America
- Nagravision
- SageTV, LLC
- Sony Electronics Inc.
- TiVo Inc. – TiVo withdrew from the group in 2014

== Successor proposals ==
=== Unlock The Box ===
In January 2016, FCC chairman Tom Wheeler proposed rulemaking to "unlock the set-top box" and the FCC voted to move forward with the proposal in February 2016. Critics claimed that this proposal was essentially AllVid which Wheeler refuted. The FCC never had a vote to adopt the proposal because Wheeler could not get a majority of commissioners to support it. In September 2020 the FCC closed the navigation device proceeding and eliminates CableCARD support and reporting requirements.

== See also ==
- Keychest
- RVU protocol
- UltraViolet
- Set-top box
