= Digital television adapter =

Type of television tuner to display digital signals on analog sets

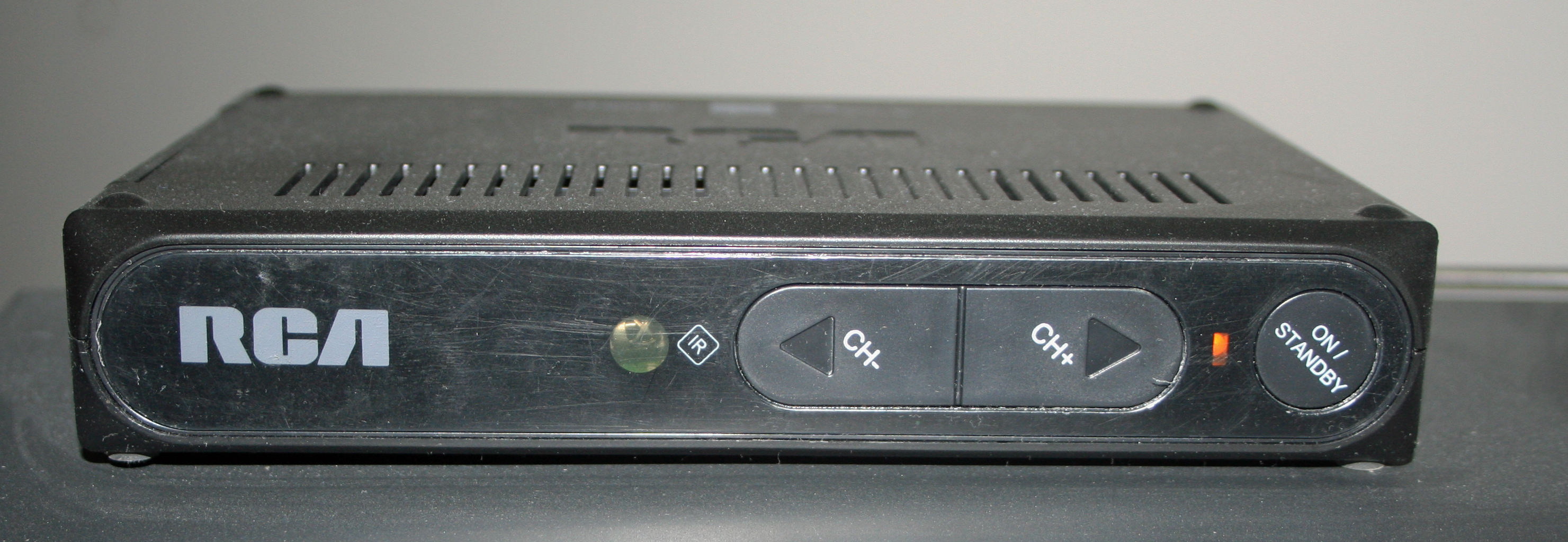
A digital TV converter box

A digital television adapter (DTA), commonly known as a converter box, DTV converter , or decoder box, is a television tuner that receives a digital television (DTV) transmission, and converts the digital signal into an analog signal that can be received and displayed on an analog television set. Some also have an HDMI output since some TVs with HDMI do not have a digital tuner. The input digital signal may be over-the-air terrestrial television signals received by a television antenna, or signals from a digital cable system. It normally does not refer to satellite TV, which has always required a set-top box either to operate the big satellite dish, or to be the integrated receiver/decoder (IRD) in the case of direct-broadcast satellites (DBS).

In North America and South Korea, these ATSC tuner boxes convert from ATSC to NTSC, while in most of Europe and other places such as Australia and most Asian countries, they convert from Digital Video Broadcasting (DVB) to PAL, and in Japan, the Philippines and almost all countries in Latin America, they convert from ISDB-T to either NTSC or PAL. Because the DTV transition did nothing to reduce the number of broadcast television system standards (and in fact further complicated them), and due to varying frequency allocations and bandplans, there are many other combinations specific to other countries.

== United States ==
On June 12, 2009, all full-power analog television transmissions ended in the United States. Viewers who watch broadcast television on older analog TV sets must use a digital converter box. Since many of the low-power TV stations continued to broadcast in analog for a while, consumers who watch low-power stations needed an adapter with an analog passthrough feature that allows the viewer to watch both digital and analog signals. Viewers who receive their television signals through cable or satellite were not affected by this change and did not need a digital television adapter (however, see the cable TV exception below). Additionally, viewers who have newer televisions with built-in digital ATSC tuners will not need an external digital television adapter.

The United States government had set up a program to offer consumers a $40 "coupon" which could be used toward the purchase of a coupon-eligible converter box; that program ended in July 2009.

=== History ===
At the Consumer Electronics Association's Entertainment Technology Policy Summit in January 2006, Federal Communications Commission (FCC) Commissioner Jonathan Adelstein said many Americans did not know about the February 17, 2009, deadline for ending analog TV. Furthermore, he said, too many people were still buying analog TV sets, meaning more demand for converter boxes. And even if people found out what they would have to do, converter boxes might not do the job adequately. Tribune Broadcasting chief technology officer Ira Goldstone said just buying a converter box did not necessarily mean getting the latest technology. Bob Seidel of CBS said companies (especially in countries other than the US) might use cheaper tuners, and people would need new television antennas for proper reception. Circuit City Chairman Alan McCollough opposed converter boxes, saying people should just buy digital TVs, and television networks should offer only widescreen-format television programming as an incentive to do that.

Prototypes of the first converter boxes appeared at the NAB show in 2006. LG Electronics, which took over Zenith Electronics in 1999, showed its model connected to a Zenith TV from 1980, while Thomson Consumer Electronics used an RCA TV from 1987 for its demonstration. Both boxes shown used electronic program guides using Program and System Information Protocol (PSIP). The devices showed program details, V-chip ratings and signal strength. Thomson's model stored three days of TV listings, allowed parental controls, and could set a VCR.

=== Differences for cable customers ===
Cable TV systems are under no deadline to convert to digital TV. However, many Comcast (and some other cable TV) customers are finding all of their non-local and non-shopping networks eliminated on various dates, even though only a few are needed for additional digital cable channels. CECBs (Coupon-eligible converter boxes) will not work on these systems because cable ATSC uses 256QAM modulation instead of 8VSB, and so a separate but similar DTA with a QAM tuner is necessary. If the cable company takes away analog channels, at least two of these adapters must be provided for free by the cable company for at least three years so that customers can continue to watch the same channels with existing equipment. Cable companies were required to provide some analog service until December 2015. After that, taking away analog channels allowed faster Internet and more HD channels. An adapter from the cable provider was needed even for digital TVs if the company scrambled its digital signals to prevent piracy.

A digital transport adapter will allow viewing of basic channels, often as many as 99, but not premium channels. It will also not allow video on demand or pay-per-view. DTAs also allow analog sets to receive digital signals using RF output on channel 3 or 4, using coaxial cable. Other versions of the DTA (including with an HDMI output) are available.

Pace plc developed the XiD-P digital transport adapter for Comcast, allowing 4K service and offering the potential to expand the DTA from one-way to two-way. This would involve adding IP capability.

== European Union ==
Most countries that have switched to digital TV use DVB-T broadcasting with MPEG-2 MP@ML or H.264 encoding. However, some have considered switching to DVB-T2 such as the UK, being the first to test DVB-T2. This results in a number of different combinations for external digital receivers with the MPEG-2s sold at about €15 to €35 and the MPEG-4 ones reaching €25 to €150. Currently, all set top boxes sold in the EU cannot exceed 0.5 W in standby mode.

== Other countries ==
Some countries have also introduced digital television and ended analog over-the-air transmissions. Most new TVs feature a digital tuner which allows reception of digital over-the-air TV without need of an external device such a converter box. If using a TV set without a digital tuner, an external converter box must be purchased and used. A converter box takes the digital signal from the antenna and outputs composite video (for SD TVs) or HDMI (for HD TVs). An RF/antenna output, if present on a converter box, is usually just a passthrough ("LOOP OUT" which does not provide the box's output signal, but only provides the raw antenna input signal to watch analog channels via a TV set's tuner if analog broadcasts have not ended yet or to connect another capable device to the same antenna feed) because even older TVs usually have at least composite input; this removes a need for an RF modulator in a converter box.

== See also ==
- Cable converter box
- FTA receiver
- Set-top box
- Digital television transition
- DTV transition in the United States
