= Digital television transition in the United States =

2009 switchover from analog to digital TV broadcasting

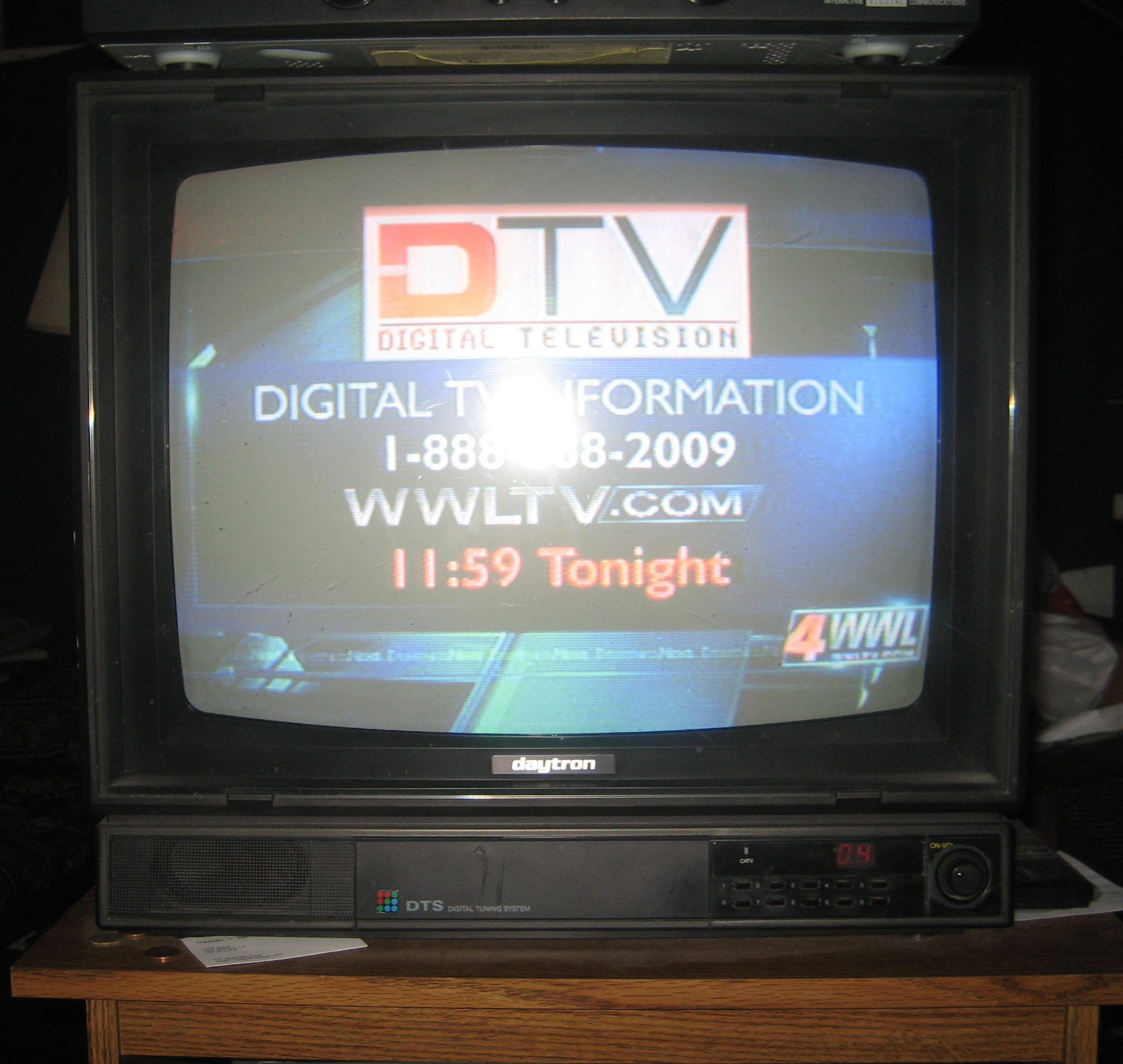
June 12, 2009 – final hours of analog broadcast on WWL-TV gave information about website and telephone number for more information about transition.

The digital television transition in the United States was the switchover from analog to exclusively digital broadcasting of terrestrial television programming. It was originally set for between December 31, 2006, and January 1, 2007, but was delayed several times due to multiple government acts being enforced on broadcasting companies. Full-power analog broadcasting ceased in most of the country on June 12, 2009; however, various aspects of analog television were continued up until 2022.

== History ==
The initial plans for the transition in 2006 were stipulated by the Telecommunications Act of 1996. However, this was put off by the Digital Transition and Public Safety Act of 2005, under which full-power broadcasting of analog television in the United States was set to have ceased after February 17, 2009. This was further delayed to June 12, 2009, after the passage of the DTV Delay Act on February 4, 2009. The delay to June 12 was to assist households on a waiting list for coupons for digital converter boxes, funding for which was provided by the American Recovery and Reinvestment Act of 2009.

While full-power broadcasting ceased on June 12, 2009, 120 full-power stations would maintain a "nightlight" service (under SAFER Act provisions) usually displaying a program about the DTV transition, ending no later than July 12, 2009. Low-power broadcasting would continue for some time. Initially scheduled to shut down on September 1, 2015, the conversion date was delayed to July 13, 2021, before finally being completed on January 10, 2022, due to several factors affecting Alaska's conversion to digital television. An attempt was made in 2007 to extend analog services by another five years in areas within 80 kilometers (50 miles) of the Mexican border, but it was unsuccessful.

In preparation for the end of analog services, all new television devices that receive signals over-the-air, including pocket-sized portable televisions, personal computer video capture card tuners, and DVD recorders, had been required to include digital ATSC tuners since March 1, 2007.

Following the analog switch-off, the FCC reallocated channels 52 through 69 (the 700MHz band) for other communications traffic, completing the reallocation of broadcast channels 52–69 that began in the late 1990s. These channels were auctioned off in early 2008, with the winning bidders taking possession of them in June 2009. Four channels from this portion of the broadcast spectrum (60, 61, 68, and 69) were held for reallocation to public safety communications (such as police, fire, and emergency rescue). Some of the remaining freed up frequencies were used for advanced commercial wireless services for consumers, such as Qualcomm's planned use of former UHF channel 55 for its MediaFLO service.

According to David Rehr, then president and CEO of the National Association of Broadcasters, this transition represented "the most significant advancement of television technology since color TV was introduced." The then-new FCC chairman Julius Genachowski said on June 30, 2009, that the transition had "succeeded far beyond expectations", but his predecessor Michael Copps said that the transition led to a "significant impact on consumers" and that it was "not a closed book".

== Transition testing ==
=== Wilmington, North Carolina test market ===
As part of a test by the FCC to iron out transition and reception concerns before the nationwide shutoff, all of the major commercial network stations in the Wilmington, North Carolina market ceased transmission of their analog signals on September 8, 2008, making it the first market in the nation to go digital-only. Wilmington was chosen as the test city in part because the area's digital channel positions would remain unchanged after the transition. Wilmington was also appropriate because it had no hills to cause reception problems and all of the stations would have UHF channels.

The low-power CBS affiliate WILM-LD signed on its new digital signal in time for the transition. The test excluded UNC-TV/PBS station WUNJ, which kept their analog signal on, as they were the official conduit of emergency information in the area.

Viewers were notified of the change by months of public service announcements, town hall meetings, and local news coverage. Only 7% of viewers were affected by the loss of analog broadcasts, the remainder subscribing to cable or satellite services, but this produced 1,800 calls to the FCC for assistance. Officials were concerned by the implications of this for larger markets or those where reliance on over-the-air broadcasts exceeds 30%.

While many calls from viewers were straightforward questions about the installation of antennas and converters, or the need to scan for channels before being able to watch digital television, hundreds more were from viewers who had installed converters and UHF antennas correctly but had still lost existing channels. Most affected were full-power broadcasters which had been on low-VHF channels. WECT (NBC 6 Wilmington), a signal which in its analog form reached the edge of Myrtle Beach, could no longer be received by many who had watched the station for years—a victim of a move to UHF 44 at a different transmitter site. WECT's coverage area had been substantially reduced; for many who were on the fringes of the analog NBC 6 signal, WECT was no longer accessible. However, weeks before, new digital-only WMBF-TV, a new NBC affiliate, came to the air to serve Myrtle Beach with a city-grade signal; like WECT, WMBF was owned by Raycom Media at the time.

On November 7, 2008, the FCC issued an order allowing distributed transmission systems (DTS) to be constructed by stations that otherwise cannot cover their original analog footprint with their new digital channels and facilities. While broadcasters may now apply for DTS facilities, this decision was made far too late to allow the extra transmitter sites to be constructed and operational before the original February 17, 2009, analog shutoff.

== Legislation ==
On February 8, 2006, President George W. Bush signed the Deficit Reduction Act of 2005 bill to end analog television by February 17, 2009.

== Impact ==
Digital TV encoding allows stations to offer higher definition video and better sound quality than analog, as well as allowing the option of programming multiple digital subchannels (multicasting). However, it provides these advantages at the cost of a severe limitation of broadcast range.

Digital signals do not have "grade B" signal areas, and are either "in perfectly" or "not in at all". Further, since most stations have preferred to use UHF rather than older VHF channel allocations, their actual broadcast range is far less than it was previously. Viewers in major metropolitan areas will likely not notice problems; however, rural TV users have generally had most or all of the stations they previously received with acceptable but not "perfect" signals fall over the digital cliff (where analog signals slowly degrade over long distances rather than digital suddenly cutting off when out of range).

Lastly, many low-power broadcasters have been temporarily permitted to transmit in analog for several years.

=== Consumer awareness ===
Although the United Kingdom spent the equivalent of more than a billion dollars educating about 60 million people, the National Telecommunications and Information Administration had received $5 million a year before the original transition date of February 17, 2009, and the FCC had received $2.5 million and was scheduled to receive $20 million more later in the year, for 300 million people, requiring voluntary education campaigns. It was also noted that low-income, elderly, disabled, inner city, immigrants, and rural Americans were targeted the most, because these groups mainly watched analog antenna TV more than any other groups.

While broadcasters were forced by Federal Communications Commission regulations to devote the equivalent of more than a billion dollars' worth of airtime to public service announcements regarding the digital transition, the amount of information conveyed in these short advertisements was by necessity limited. Both the on-air announcements and government-funded telephone hotlines receiving viewer inquiries directed consumers to Internet sites to seek information, at a time when most affected were not familiar with the Internet.

=== Obsolete equipment ===
After the switch, consumers' old analog televisions, VCRs, DVRs, and other devices which lacked a digital tuner no longer received over-the-air television. Though previously recorded content can still be replayed, new content cannot be accessed. The one, direct solution to the problem was to buy an external tuner (called a converter box) that receives DTV signals directly and converts them to analog for the television, VCR, or other analog device. Another solution was the use of a cable TV or satellite TV service, as these providers handled the necessary conversion within their respective systems and could provide the analog signal these older analog devices required.

Users of analog VCRs, DVRs, or other recording devices which lacked a digital tuner had the unique problem of no longer being able to record programs across multiple channels. In order to record multiple DTV channels, the viewer had to use an external tuner box and set the device to record the output from that box, typically L-1 for the line input. Some manufacturers sold external converter boxes or tuners that automatically changed channels at preset times. The analog VCR or DVR may record at preset times, but will continue recording the L-1 line input, which would be the same channel unless the channel is manually changed.

Alternatively, the user may purchase a new TV, DVR, or DVD recorder with a built-in digital tuner. However, these newer technologies have their own drawbacks, such as being limited to only 1–2 hours with high-quality XP mode (DVD-R).

=== Loss of service ===
A major concern is that the broadcast technology used for ATSC signals called 8VSB has problems receiving signals inside buildings and in urban areas, largely due to multipath reception issues which cause ghosting and fading on analog images, but can also lead to intermittent signal or no reception at all on ATSC programs. DTV broadcasts exhibit a digital cliff effect, by which viewers will receive either a perfect signal or no signal at all with little or no middle ground. Digital transmissions do contain additional data bits to provide error correction for a finite number of bit errors; once signal quality degrades beyond that point, recovery of the original digital signal becomes impossible, and the image on the screen freezes, or blinks back and forth to and from a completely black image.

The maximum power for DTV broadcast classes is also substantially lower; one-fifth of the legal limits for the former full-power analog services. This is because there are only eight different states in which an 8VSB signal can be in at any one moment; thus, like all digital transmissions, very little signal is required at the receiver in order to decode it. Nonetheless, this limit is often too low for many stations to reach many rural areas, which was an alleged benefit in the FCC's choice of ATSC and 8VSB over the worldwide-standard DVB-T and its COFDM modulation. Additionally, without the hierarchical modulation of DVB, signal loss is complete, and there is no switch to a lower resolution before this occurs.

A hundred-kW analog station on TV channels 2 to 6 would therefore be faced with the choice of either lowering its power by 80% (to the twenty-kilowatt limit of low-VHF DTV) or abandoning a frequency which it has occupied since the 1950s in order to transmit more power (up to 1000 kW) on the less-crowded UHF TV band. Such stations can keep the same channel number, however, because of ATSC virtual channels. The higher frequencies are challenged in areas where signals must travel great distances or encounter significant terrestrial obstacles. Most stations in the low-VHF (channels 2–6) did not return to these frequencies after the transition. About 40 stations remained in the low-VHF after the transition, with the majority in smaller markets (with a few notable exceptions). The FCC has long discouraged the digital allocation on low-VHF channels for several reasons: higher ambient noise, interference with FM radio (channel 6 borders FM at 88 MHz), and larger antenna size required for these channels. After the transition, many viewers using "high-definition" antennas have reported problems receiving stations that broadcast on VHF channels. This is because some of the new antennas marketed as "HDTV antennas" from manufacturers such as Channel Master were only designed for channels 7–51 and are more compact than their channel 2–69 counterparts. These manufacturers did not anticipate widespread continued use of the relatively longer wavelength low-VHF channels.

Stations broadcasting on channel 6, using the original analog standard, had an additional benefit of having their audio broadcast on 87.7 MHz FM, which is at the very low end of the FM radio dial. As such, many stations on channel 6 took advantage of this, and promoted this feature, especially during drive time newscasts, and as a critical source of information in markets where severe weather (such as hurricanes) allowed a station to broadcast their audio via FM radio without having to contract with another FM operation to do so. WDSU in New Orleans, Miami's WTVJ and WECT in Wilmington, North Carolina were among the most well-known Channel 6 broadcasters, which used this approach to provide emergency information during hurricanes. Digital television, however, does not have this feature, and after a transition to the ATSC 1.0 digital standard, this additional method of reception is no longer available.

WRGB, channel 6 in Albany, New York, employing a variation of the ATSC 1.0 digital TV standard, used a separate transmitter on 87.7 that transmitted a vertically polarized analog audio signal, which would theoretically avoid interference with the horizontally polarized digital TV signal. This would allow the station to keep its audio on 87.7 FM after the transition to digital. WRGB ran this transmitter for approximately 6 weeks on an experimental basis, only to find that the vertically polarized 87.7 MHz signal interfered with the digital video, while broadcast of analog signals on 87.9 MHz was met with FCC objections. WITI in Milwaukee took a more direct, though still experimental, approach to restore their TV audio, having it restored in August 2009 to an HD Radio subchannel of WMIL-FM via a content agreement with WMIL owner Clear Channel Communications. A purchase of HD Radio equipment or having a car stereo equipped with an HD Radio receiver is required to listen to this broadcast. A variation of the ATSC 3.0 standard, developed for Low-Power TV (LPTV) stations, includes an analog FM signal on 87.7, in addition to the digital video. The FCC refers to these stations as "FM6" operations.

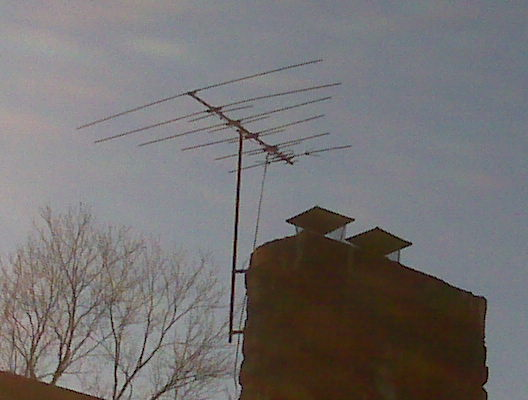
An outdoor high-gain antenna was assumed in planning for DTV reception.

Planning for DTV reception assumed "a properly oriented, high-gain antenna mounted 30 feet in the air outside." The Consumer Electronics Association set up a website called AntennaWeb to identify the means needed to provide the correct signal reception to over-the-air viewers. Another website, TVFool provides geographic mapping and signal data to allow viewers to estimate the number of channels which will be gained or lost as a result of digital transition. While it estimated that marginally more stations would be gained than lost by viewers, this varied widely, with viewers of low-VHF analog signals in distant-fringe areas among the most adversely affected. An estimated 1.8 million people were expected to lose the ability to access over-the-air TV entirely as a result of the digital transition.

Viewers in rural and mountainous regions were particularly prone to lose all reception after the digital transition.

=== Problems ===
U.S. markets, which have presented unique problems for digital transition include:

- New York City-Newark was one of the early U.S. terrestrial digital television pioneers with state-of-the-art ATSC facilities installed atop the World Trade Center as early as 1998, but those facilities were destroyed in the September 11 attacks, and for a number of years, New York City lacked one single point of sufficient height from which to cover the entire region without severe multipath interference issues in downtown Manhattan. The 1,776-foot 1 World Trade Center, proposed to replace the former World Trade Center, would not be completed for some time, so several scenarios were considered to enhance service. One such system, called distributed transmission, was being funded by a $30 million federal grant to ensure that no viewers were left without service. The DTS would have used low power transmitters to fill gaps in coverage from the Empire State Building. The Metropolitan Television Alliance, a group of eleven New York and New Jersey broadcasters organized soon after the destruction of the facilities at the World Trade Center, led the development of the DTS system. In 2004, a partial solution was implemented: the top of the Condé Nast Building at 4 Times Square was reinforced and installed with a massive multiplexed UHF antenna. This relieved overcrowding at Empire State by using the site of a local Clear Channel radio facility to replace master antenna installations destroyed at WTC.
- New Orleans and portions of Mississippi were operating some digital transmitters from temporary locations or from towers belonging to other stations due to damage done during Hurricane Katrina and Hurricane Rita in 2005. While stations were back on air, quickly, the coverage area often did not match that specified on the station licenses due to the changes in antenna locations.
- Denver faces unique multipath interference problems largely due to its mountainous location; its antennas on Lookout Mountain would need to increase in height to overcome obstacles to digital reception, but attempts to get local zoning approval were all met with strong opposition. Federal legislation was ultimately used to require that Denver stations be allowed to construct their post-transition digital facilities, but sharp nulls and gaps in coverage remained.
- Sparsely populated mountainous regions such as Montana and Utah currently rely heavily on broadcast translators to rebroadcast network stations into underserved communities; while these low-power retransmitters are not, themselves, required to broadcast digitally, many would need costly upgrades to receive a digital signal from the originating station—if the signal can be received at all. 23% of the 4000 licensed translators received federal subsidies to make the conversion, but many others simply went dark. In sparsely populated markets such as Glendive, Montana, translators were needed to reach the widely scattered audience, but the readiness of many small municipally owned translators remained largely unknown.
- Many other stations in the Rocky Mountains had chosen to end analog broadcasts early because of poor winter conditions at transmission sites in February; stations needed to be sure they could make the on-site adjustments. For these broadcasters, the DTV Delay Act and its extended deadline of June 12, 2009, came too late to be of use, as the digital transition had already been completed.
- Vermont, a market in which all major stations were, as of February 2009, digital-only, is problematic as it is both a rural state and a mountainous region. WCAX CBS 3 in Burlington, and WPTZ NBC 5 in Plattsburgh, New York were henceforth both UHF broadcasts from Mount Mansfield, causing many viewers to lose access to the stations. Previously as analog VHF stations, WCAX transmitted from Mount Mansfield, while WPTZ was broadcast from Terry Mountain in Peru, New York, on the opposite shore of Lake Champlain.
- Buffalo, New York, a city whose stations mostly broadcast from among the Boston Hills and cover a fairly rugged terrain along the Appalachian Plateau, is one of several markets in which the primary stations are VHF stations that operate on channels 2, 4, and 7. All three stations were assigned DTV channels in the UHF spectrum; all lost significant broadcast coverage in the transition, and viewers in the western Twin Tiers region lost all of their broadcast stations. In May 2009, both WIVB (channel 4) and WGRZ (channel 2) warned its viewers that were not in Erie or Niagara Counties that they would likely lose the broadcast signal, reducing the station's coverage area from approximately 12 counties to just two, along with several parts of southern Ontario, a critical viewing audience for all Buffalo television stations.
- Syracuse, New York had since 1948 employed low-VHF channels to feed networks to adjacent markets (notably CBS to the northern two-thirds of the Utica market and NBC to the southern half of the Watertown market). These markets are 60 to 75 miles (100 to 125 km) away. Utica lost CBS service because its affiliate, based in Syracuse, broadcast on channel 5 analog (with a signal strong enough to reach Utica), but its channel 47 digital signal does not reach anywhere near Utica. Channel 5 had historically refused to cede its Utica territory to another potential affiliate, but in October 2015, CBS signed an affiliation deal with NBC affiliate WKTV, which restored CBS service to the Utica market via its second digital subchannel (prior to this, Binghamton affiliate WBNG-TV (channel 12) had served the southern third of the Utica market, which corresponds to the Cooperstown area). Similarly, Watertown, New York and Kingston, Ontario lost Syracuse NBC affiliate WSTM-TV once the DTV transition rendered Syracuse a UHF island; WSTM-TV continues to be shown on local cable systems. Like CBS in Utica, NBC eventually restored service to the Watertown market, signing an affiliation deal with new sign-on WVNC-LD in November 2016.
- On January 15, 2009, Hawaii became the first state in the United States to have its television stations switch from analog to digital early. Existing analog facilities at Mount Haleakala on Maui were removed due to ongoing radio interference with astronomy equipment operated under the watchful eye of the United States Department of Defense and University of Hawaiʻi. The digital stations were deployed using new facilities at Ulupalakua, and the old towers had been removed before bird nesting season began that March. By making the switch early, the broadcast towers atop Haleakala near the birds' nesting grounds could be dismantled without interfering with the Hawaiian petrels' nesting season.
- Between June 12, 2009, and July 1, 2009, programs on the Fox network were unavailable to viewers throughout the state of Montana (except viewers in the Billings area) who did not have cable or satellite service. The stations in Butte, Great Falls and Missoula were among many full-powered stations owned by Equity Broadcasting. Equity filed for Chapter 11 bankruptcy in 2008, and the stations went silent on June 12, 2009, due to the inability to fund construction of digital facilities. Unlike most established broadcasters, Equity had expanded rapidly using outlying UHF stations as satellite-fed repeaters. Many but not all were low-power TV stations, typically carrying Univisión or smaller networks such as UPN (later The CW) and The WB (later MyNetworkTV). The majority of Equity's full-power operations came to the air after 1997, by which time the digital transition was already in progress. The stations were therefore not allocated a second, digital companion channel and were not required to simulcast digitally until their required flash-cut to digital signals at the end of transition. Although Equity conducted a successful auction for the stations in April 2009, the required federal government approval came too late for the new owner, Max Media, to do the flash cuts. Eventually, Max Media chose to move the affiliation to digital subchannels of their respective new sister stations, all ABC affiliates. Other stations formerly owned by Equity, such as KUOK in Oklahoma City, were able to make flash-cuts under new ownership and are still on the air. Many stations were sold at auction to Daystar Television Network, which will construct the digital facilities and air religious programming on the acquired stations; in some cases, these went silent, returning to operation after slightly less than a year off-air in order to avoid losing the full-service licenses. At least one affected station, WNGS Buffalo (now WBBZ-TV), had been subsequently resold while silent. (In all, the FCC signed on 136 full-power stations after the original allocation of digital signals.) Except for the full-service Equity stations, almost all were able to flash-cut by the deadline. Notable exceptions were Pappas-owned KCWK (which went silent several months before digital transition was originally to be completed and never returned; KCWK's license was cancelled by the FCC on June 2, 2009) and WWAZ-TV (which returned in August 2012 to the air).

There are 80 media markets in which more than 100,000 households receive television signals by over-the-air broadcasts.

=== Frequency reallocation ===
The reclaimed channels were to be used for a variety of mobile services, including mobile phones, the now-defunct MediaFLO (55), and public safety (63/64 base, 68/69 mobile). Most of this mobile spectrum has been sold to existing incumbent providers, with AT&T Mobility and Verizon as the largest bidders (see United States 2008 wireless spectrum auction).

The elimination of UHF channels, rather than VHF channels as in the rest of the world, precludes the use of band III (high VHF) for Digital Audio Broadcasting as is used in a few other countries. It also makes the reassignment of channels 5 and 6 (76 to 88MHz) to expand the FM radio broadcast band more difficult. There are no channels set aside for analog broadcasts of the Emergency Alert System, rendering most portable emergency TV sets useless. While a small number of portable ATSC sets have started to appear, these are costly. A portable converter box (such as Winegard's RCDT09A) would require a bulky external battery, and mobile ATSC is not yet available. Another option would be getting a USB-based TV tuner card for their laptop computer, which in addition to its low costs became a popular option after Microsoft released Windows 7 four months after the DTV transition ended.

A Google-sponsored program called Free the Airwaves sought to use the "empty" white space within the remaining TV for unlicensed use, like for Wi-Fi.

In March 2008, the FCC requested public comment on turning the bandwidth currently occupied by analog television channels 5 and 6 (76–88 MHz) over to extending the FM broadcast band when the digital television transition was to be completed in February 2009 (ultimately delayed to June 2009). This proposed allocation would effectively assign frequencies corresponding to the existing Japanese FM radio service (which begins at 76 MHz) for use as an extension to the existing North American FM broadcast band.

On August 22, 2011, the United States' Federal Communications Commission announced a freeze on all future applications for broadcast stations requesting to use channel 51, to prevent adjacent-channel interference (ACI) to the A-Block of the 700MHz band. Later that year (on December 16, 2011), Industry Canada and the CRTC followed suit in placing a moratorium on future television stations using Channel 51 for broadcast use, to prevent ACI to the A-Block of the 700MHz band.

== Digital-to-analog converters ==
Now that the switch from analog to digital broadcasts is complete, analog TVs are incapable of receiving over-the-air broadcasts without the addition of a set-top converter box. Consequently, a digital-to-analog converter, an electronic device that connects to an analog television, must be used in order to allow the television to receive digital broadcasts. The box may also be called a "set-top" converter, "digital TV adapter" (DTA), or "digital set-top box" (DSTB).

=== Coupon program ===
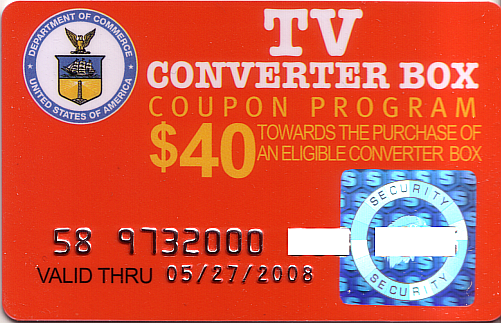
An example of the FCC converter box $40 subsidy coupon in the form of a bank card which was unable to be used for anything except for a converter box purchase

To assist consumers through the conversion, the Department of Commerce through its National Telecommunications and Information Administration (NTIA) division handled requests from households for up to two $40 coupons for digital-to-analog converter boxes beginning January 1, 2008, via a toll-free number or a website. The program was paid for with a small part of the $20 billion taken in from the DTV spectrum auction. However, these government coupons were limited to an initial sum of $890 million (22.25 million coupons) with the option to grow to $1.34 billion (33.5 million coupons), which is far short of the estimated 112 million households (224 million redeemable coupons) in the United States. Nevertheless, not every household took advantage of the offer, as reports indicate half of all households already had at least one digital TV. In January 2009, the NTIA began placing coupon requests on a waiting list after the program reached its maximum allowed funding. New requests for coupons were fulfilled only after unredeemed coupons expired.

These coupons could be redeemed toward the purchase of a digital-to-analog converter at brick and mortar, online, and telephone retailers that had completed the NTIA certification process. Retail prices for the boxes range from $40 to $70 (plus tax and shipping); after applying the coupons, the price to the consumer would be between $5 and $40 per box. Because it was actually used as a payment, despite the name "coupon", consumers paid state and local sales tax on the coupon amount, which in effect reduced its value by about $3 (based on 7.5% tax).

There has been possible evidence that the presence of the government coupon program had inflated the prices of converter boxes by between $21 and $34 above what they would be otherwise. These converter boxes require royalties to be paid to license the MPEG-2 and ATSC patents, which may contribute to their costs (for example, the royalties for ATSC were $5 per receiver).

== Extension of transition to June 12 ==
=== DTV Delay Act ===
DTV Delay Act
- Long title: An act to postpone the DTV transition date.
- Enacted by: the 111th United States Congress
- Effective: February 11, 2009

Citations
- Public law: 111-4
- Statutes at Large: 123 Stat. 112–114

Codification
- U.S.C. sections amended: 47 U.S.C. § 309; 47 U.S.C. § 337

Legislative history
- Introduced in the Senate as S. 352 by Jay Rockefeller (D–WV) on January 29, 2009; Passed the Senate on January 29, 2009 (unanimous consent); Passed the House on February 4, 2009 (264–158); Signed into law by President Barack Obama on February 11, 2009

On January 21, 2009, Senator Jay Rockefeller introduced a bill in the Senate titled the DTV Delay Act because millions of Americans would not be ready for the cutoff on February 17 due to a shortage of converter box coupons, and proposed that the transition date be moved to June 12. Rockefeller, chairman of the Committee on Commerce, Science and Transportation, and Sen. Kay Bailey Hutchison, worked together on the bill. Hutchison supported the idea because Rockefeller did not intend to ask for another postponement. On January 22, The Nielsen Company said 6.5 million Americans had not prepared for the switch. Opponents pointed out that TV stations would face extra operating expenses, and those who paid to use the spectrum to be made available would have to wait.

Under later amendments, stations could choose to end analog broadcasts before June 12 even if the bill passed, and any frequencies freed up by such action could be used by fire and police departments and other emergency services. Those whose converter box coupons had expired would be allowed to apply for new coupons. The House postponed a similar bill (by House Energy and Commerce Committee Chairman Henry Waxman), until the Senate's version was complete.

The Senate unanimously voted on January 26, 2009, to delay the digital TV transition to June 12, 2009. However, the House of Representatives voted on and defeated a similar measure on January 28. Rep. Joe Barton led the movement in the House to defeat the measure, saying that "the DTV transition is neither stuck nor broke", and that any problems with the DTV transition can be fixed. Barton also said, "I guarantee you, no matter when you set the date— February 17, June 12, July the Fourth, Valentine's Day— there are going to be some people that aren't ready."

On January 29, the DTV Delay Act passed in the Senate. On February 4, the House also approved this measure.

The bill was submitted to President Obama on February 4, who did not immediately sign it into law. On February 9, President Obama posted the bill on whitehouse.gov, giving the public five days to weigh in on it. Under a midnight February 10 deadline imposed by the FCC, broadcasters disclosed whether they would still cease broadcasting analog signals on the original date of February 17, or if they would delay until June 12, should the DTV Delay Act be signed into law. On February 10, the FCC published the list. 491 stations stated they intended to transition on February 17. The FCC reserved final say on which stations would be allowed to transition on February 17 and which ones would be required to continue analog broadcasts, depending on how many viewers in each market have been determined not ready for the transition. Most O&O stations of six major networks (ABC, CBS, Fox, NBC, Univision, and Telemundo, plus The CW, MyNetworkTV, TeleFutura, and independent stations), as well as the station groups of Gannett, Hearst-Argyle, and Meredith, committed to keeping all or most of their analog signals active until the new June 12 cutoff date. On February 11, 2009, President Obama signed the bill into law, officially moving the cutoff date to June 12, 2009. In total, 191 stations already had turned off their analog transmitters for good.

On February 20, 2009, the FCC released an order stating that stations that wish to go all digital before the final June 12, 2009, date must inform the FCC of that decision by March 17, 2009.

While 93 large-city network owned and operated stations (controlled by CBS, ABC, NBC, Fox, and Univision) would continue analog broadcasts until June 12, many small-market broadcasters were unable to justify the extra cost, with non-commercial and independent stations heavily adversely affected. No funding was provided to reimburse broadcasters who incurred additional costs due to the DTV Delay Act.

Public Broadcasting Service CEO Paula Kerger had estimated a $22 million cost to the nation's PBS member stations to extend simulcasting until June 12; more than a hundred PBS stations ultimately elected to stick to the original deadline. Some individual commercial station groups, most notably Sinclair Broadcast Group and Gray Television, shut down the vast majority of their analog signals on the original deadline. Others left the question to their individual local stations. Many local markets, ranging from Burlington, Vermont and Sioux City, Iowa to San Diego, lost analog signals from most or all major U.S. stations. Some stations in coastal regions such as Fort Myers, Florida had chosen not to wait until June 12 so as to ensure the transition was complete before hurricane season.

In some cases, the Federal Communications Commission forced stations to continue full-power analog broadcast of at least a local newscast and information on the digital transition for an additional sixty days—a costly move for independent affected broadcasters. Of the 491 stations which had indicated their intention to go digital-only in February 2009, 123 affiliates of four major U.S. commercial networks (ABC, CBS, Fox, NBC) were targeted by Federal Communications Commission opposition, precluding or applying additional restrictions to the shutdown of their analog signals in markets where the only analog service remaining after the February 17 shutdown would have been an independent or educational broadcaster, an adjacent-market station or a low-power station. Of approximately 1,800 U.S. full-service TV stations, an additional 190 were already digital-only before February 2009; these included Hawaii (digital since January 2009), Zanesville, Ohio (digital since July 2008), and Wilmington, North Carolina (the FCC's 2008 digital test market), as well as some new stations and a few broadcasters forced to shut down analog early due to technical problems.

On April 12, Nielsen estimated that 3.6 million households remained unready; key problem markets (according to FCC and NTIA) included Albuquerque, Baltimore, Cleveland, Dallas–Fort Worth, Denver, Fresno, Houston, Brownsville, Indianapolis, Los Angeles, Minneapolis–St. Paul, Phoenix, Portland, Oregon, Tulsa, Sacramento, St. Louis, the San Francisco Bay Area, Salt Lake City, and Seattle.

=== Nightlighting (DTV Nightlight) ===
On February 11, 2009, the FCC announced it would allow 368 of the 491 applied stations to go all-digital on the original February 17 date, 100 of which will be allowed to use their analog signal to inform unprepared viewers of the new transition date, or for emergency situations such as severe weather (called "nightlighting"). The FCC concluded that the other 123 stations who applied present a "significant risk of substantial public harm," if they go all digital on February 17. The FCC stated "We considered the presence of major networks and their affiliates critical to ensuring that viewers have access to local news and public affairs available over the air because the major network affiliates are the primary source of local broadcast news and public affairs programming". The FCC would not permit the 123 stations in "at-risk" markets to proceed unless they had certified with the agency by 6 pm ET on February 13 that they comply with eight additional requirements, including ensuring that at least one station that is currently providing analog service to an area within the DMA provides DTV transition and emergency information, as well as local news and public affairs programming ("enhanced nightlight" service) for at least 60 days following February 17.

On February 13, the FCC said 53 of the applied 106 at risk stations had qualified to go all digital on February 17. The other 43 qualified for nightlight service; 10 others could not comply with the nightlight clause. The total number of stations which became digital only on February 17 was 421.

=== Provisions in American Recovery and Reinvestment Act of 2009 ===
House Republican Joe Barton from Texas, who strongly opposed the DTV Delay Act, introduced a bill that would insert $650 million in DTV transition assistance into The American Recovery and Reinvestment Act of 2009 to be used for making more converter box coupons available and for DTV education, which was strongly supported by the Obama administration. The American Recovery and Reinvestment Act of 2009 passed with this revision in the House with a vote of 244–188 on January 28, 2009, and the Senate passed the bill on February 10 by a vote of 61–37.

Congressional negotiators announced on February 11, 2009, that they had reached agreement on a $789 billion economic stimulus bill. President Obama signed the final $787 billion version into law on February 17, 2009, in Denver, Colorado. The final version included the DTV provisions.

While the economic stimulus bill did allow additional funds for coupons, there was also a risk that available retail stock of the converter boxes themselves could prove inadequate. The Consumer Electronics Association had estimated three to six million boxes remained in-stock at the beginning of February 2009; Nielsen Media Research reported five million households as "completely unready" for digital transition in this same time period. The average U.S. household used 3 television screens. However, the converter box coupon program only allowed 2 coupons per household.

The American Recovery and Reinvestment Act of 2009 also allocated funds for expert installation services for those switching to DTV.

The FCC awarded the contract to several companies to provide expert installation services.

== Problems with the final transition ==
=== Initial problems ===
On May 1, 2009, Nielsen Media Research reported that 3.1% of Americans were still completely unprepared for the transition. On June 11, 2009, one day before the analog shutoff, the National Association of Broadcasters reported that 1.75 million Americans were still not ready.

971 TV stations made the final switch to digital on June 12. It was believed Albuquerque, Santa Fe, Austin, and Dallas would be the least prepared markets, but this turned out not to be the case, as most of the difficulties were in the Northeast, primarily with stations that changed their digital frequencies from UHF to VHF.

On June 13, 2009, the FCC said their help line, with about 4,000 answering phones, received 317,450 calls on June 12. About one-third of callers still needed converter boxes, and one-fifth had reception problems. Acting FCC chair Michael Copps said, "Our job is far from over. This transition is not a one-day affair."

In New York City, about 11,000 people called the FCC for assistance, the most of any market. The other areas from which the most calls to the FCC were made: Chicago (6526), Los Angeles (5473), Dallas–Fort Worth (5473), and Philadelphia (3749). Around 900,000 calls were received in total.

The National Association of Broadcasters said 278 TV stations received 35,500 calls, but most callers merely needed to rescan.

The Commerce Department said 319,900 households requested converter box coupons on June 11, almost four times the average of the previous month.

SmithGeiger LLC said 2.2 million homes were not ready, while Nielsen said the number was 2.8 million. This included homes which had requested coupons. On June 14, Nielsen said the number was 2.5 million, or 2.2 percent of homes. That number was down to 2.1 million, or 1.8 percent, by June 21, and 1.7 million, or 1.5 percent, a week later. One month after the transition, the number was 1.5 million, 1.3 percent, and after nearly 2 months, the number was down to just over one million, or 1.1 percent. As of August 30, 2009, the number was 710,000, as 572,000 had upgraded in August and 1.8 million since June 12.

In some cases where digital frequencies moved, people have been advised not only to re-scan but to "double-scan", in order to clear outdated information from the digital TV or converter box memory.

Calls to the FCC decreased from 43,000 a day in the week ending June 15 to 21,000 the next week. Reception problems, representing nearly a third of calls at first, were down to one-fifth.

On June 15, 2009, U.S. Representative Peter DeFazio, an Oregon Democrat, introduced the House version of The Digital TV Transition Fairness Act, which Senator Bernie Sanders introduced in December 2008. It would require video service providers to offer a $10 basic package to anyone who lost at least one channel to the DTV conversion (with broadcasters waiving fees), pay for outdoor antennas (including installation) and extend the converter box program beyond July 31. It did not pass.

=== VHF frequencies and digital television ===
One of the most common problems was the return to VHF frequencies by stations that had used them when they were analog. Over 480 stations were broadcasting digitally on the VHF spectrum after the transition, up from only 216 on the frequencies before. Many antennas marketed for digital TV are designed for UHF, which most digital stations use. VHF analog signals travel further than UHF signals, but watchable VHF digital signals appear to have a more limited range than UHF with the lower power they are assigned, and they do not penetrate buildings as well, especially in larger cities. Mike Doback, vice president of engineering for Scripps Television, said, "It's only now that we've found out the planning factors were probably wrong in terms of how much power you need to replicate analog service." According to TV consultant Peter Putman, the problem with VHF reception is that VHF antennas must be large to be effective, and indoor antennas do not perform well enough. In addition, channels 2 through 6 are more susceptible to many types of interference. Richard Mertz of Cavell, Mertz & Associates says multipath interference inside the house is also a factor. Some receivers can deal with this problem better than others, but there are no standards. And with amplified antennas or amplifiers, it is possible to overload a converter box. Amplifiers can also cause noise that is interpreted as data. Raycom Media Chief Technology Officer Dave Folsom said, "There's nothing inherently wrong with VHF. It's just easier to have interference, because it goes out further."

The FCC sent extra personnel to Chicago, Philadelphia, and New York City to deal with difficulties in those cities. WLS-TV had received 1,735 calls just by the end of the day on June 12, and an estimated 5,000 calls in total by June 16. WLS-TV is just one station which may solve its problems by increasing its signal strength, but doing this required making sure no other stations were affected. A low-power analog station, not required to shut down after 30 days like other nightlight stations, aired newscasts that could not be seen by a number of people after the transition, while the stations attempted to solve problems.

In Philadelphia, most of the problems were with WPVI-TV, which had the area's leading news program, and public station WHYY-TV. Many people having trouble with those stations could pick up stations from Reading and Atlantic City. Unlike WLS, WPVI had concerns about increasing its signal because of potential interference to other stations and to FM radio.

In New York City, many called the FCC because they lived in apartment buildings with a single roof antenna which was not suitable for digital reception. The city reported antenna shortages and numerous requests for cable service.

By the end of June, four stations had received permission to increase power. Ten other stations asked for power increases as well, but these were not in major cities; instead, the markets were in rural or mountainous areas such as Montana, Virginia, and Alabama. KNMD-TV in Santa Fe tried an alternate VHF channel.

The FCC had two concerns about the requests for more power: some stations just wanted a competitive advantage and were not actually experiencing difficulties. Other stations wanted UHF frequencies instead because UHF worked better with mobile digital TV. However, some stations with legitimate problems had asked to return to their UHF frequencies.

Two months after the transition, "two or three-dozen" stations continued to have problems. Three months after the transition, about 50 stations had applied for a power increase.

"Approximately a half-dozen stations" were still deciding at the end of October about what to do. In some of the cases where stations returned to UHF, interference to nearby stations prevented a power increase.

Ironically, KUAC-TV in Fairbanks, Alaska moved from channel 24 back to channel 9 in September 2009. The area never had UHF before DTV, so most people had VHF antennas, while few people lived in apartment buildings. The higher power needed for UHF cost too much, and channel 24 had signal problems, so the station asked to move back.

Of the 79 stations asking for a new channel, 22 wanted to go from VHF to UHF, and 10 wanted to go from UHF to VHF.

== Evaluating the transition ==
On June 30, 2009, his first full day as FCC Chairman, Julius Genachowski said in a speech that the transition "succeeded far beyond expectations. You pulled it off by working collaboratively with each other across the agency, and with the Commerce Department and other parts of government, and by thinking creatively to leverage all available resources."

Still, the FCC planned a report on how well the transition went, and Genachowski admitted more work was needed.

Genachowski's predecessor Michael Copps called the process

A huge transition with significant impact on consumers that was not until the last moment adequately planned for or coordinated. [It was] a transition that led to problems that were largely predictable and one that we moved measurably forward from January to June to the benefit of many consumers. But it's not a closed book. It is ongoing. There are still problems out there, lessons to be learned and a document to write.

== Low-power stations ==
In September 2010, the FCC proposed the implementation of a hard deadline of 2012 for low power stations to broadcast in digital, though this deadline was not adopted.

On July 15, 2011, the Federal Communications Commission issued a final ruling regarding Broadcast translator (TX), Low-powered (LP), and Class-A low-powered (-CA) stations, requiring that analog transmitters shut down by September 1, 2015. Transmitters on channels 52 to 69 were required to vacate their channels by December 31, 2011, but may remain in analog on another channel until the September 1, 2015 deadline. As part of the rules that were imposed, low power VHF stations on channels 2 to 6 can transmit with a maximum ERP 3 kW instead of the previously allowed maximum of 0.3 kW.

On August 13, 2009, the Community Broadcasters Association (CBA) announced in a statement that it would shut down after 20 years of representing LPTV stations. One reason given was the cost required to fight "restrictive regulations that kept the Class A and LPTV industry from realizing its potential," including the campaign to require analog passthrough, a converter box feature that allows both digital and analog television to be viewed on older TVs. Amy Brown, former CBA executive director, said, "some 40% of Class A and LPTV station operators believe they will have to shut down in the next year if they are not helped through the digital transition." On April 24, 2015, the requirement for broadcast translator (TX) and low-powered (-LP) stations to convert by September 1 of that year was suspended, pending the then-upcoming spectrum auction. After the auction's completion in 2017, on May 17 of that year the FCC announced July 13, 2021 as the new analog low-power shutoff date. On June 21, 2021, the FCC granted the State of Alaska an extension due to novel factors that prevented the completion of stations' digital facilities, setting a new low-power analog shutoff date of January 10, 2022.

== Spectrum reallocation ==
The 2008 United States wireless spectrum auction effectively eliminated 700 MHz UHF channels 52–69 as of the June 2009 digital transition. After this, the study of how to further increase spectrum for wireless broadband began in 2009. Some plans called for eliminating broadcast TV entirely, but opponents of such a plan said the efforts made during the DTV transition would become pointless. By 2010, voluntary efforts were planned. Sharing channels, made possible by the first transition, was approved in 2012. Another spectrum auction planned for 2014 (and delayed to 2016) created a second digital transition, wherein UHF stations operating on channels 38–51 in the 600 MHz band were moved into VHF channels 2-13 or UHF channels 14–36. This was done in ten phases from 2017 to 2020.

== ATSC 3.0 ==
ATSC 3.0 (also known by the moniker NextGen TV) is a new digital television transmission standard which is not backwards compatible with ATSC 1.0, the standard employed in the 2009 digital transition. Transition to ATSC 3.0 is voluntary on both ends: television manufacturers are not required to provide ATSC 3.0 compatible tuners in televisions. Further, digital television stations may elect to broadcast in ATSC 3.0 at any time, with the caveat that they must simulcast ATSC 1.0 signals for up to five years after beginning broadcasts in ATSC 3.0.

If and when digital television stations sunset their ATSC 1.0 broadcasts, consumers that wish to see the newer broadcasts will be required to purchase televisions which can receive ATSC 3.0, install a software update (for sets that have the capability to be updated in such a manner), or purchase ATSC 3.0 tuners for their older digital television sets.

== See also ==
- Coupon-eligible converter box
- North American television frequencies
