= Digital channel election =

A digital channel election was the process by which television stations in the United States chose which physical radio-frequency TV channel they would permanently use after the analog shutdown in 2009. The process was managed and mandated by the Federal Communications Commission for all full-power TV stations. Low-powered television (LPTV) stations are going through a somewhat different process, and are also allowed to flash-cut to digital.

== Process ==
Stations could choose to keep their initial digital TV channel allocation, do a flash-cut to their former analog TV channel, or attempt to select another channel, often an analog channel or pre-transition digital channel from another station that had been orphaned. Stations on channels 52 to 69 did not have the first option, as the FCC and then the U.S. Congress revoked them from the bandplan.

Many stations have chosen to keep their new channels permanently, after being forced to buy all new transmitters and television antennas. In some cases where the station's current analog tower could not handle the stress of the new digital antenna's weight and wind load, station owners had to construct entirely new broadcast towers in order to comply with the FCC's DTV mandate.

Most broadcasters were bitter at having to purchase digital equipment and broadcast a digital signal when very few homeowners had digital television sets. The FCC allowed broadcasters the opportunity to petition the Federal Communications Commission (FCC) for special temporary authority (STA) to operate their digital facilities at low power, thereby allowing broadcasters additional time in which to purchase their full-power digital facilities. However, the FCC gave a stern July 2006 deadline for all full-power television stations to at least replicate 80% of their current analog coverage area, or run the risk of losing protection from encroachment by other stations.

Most stations made an election in the first round, and most of those received their requested channels. Applicant conflicts with neighboring stations had to request a different channel in the second round. The third and final round occurred in May 2006.

Some stations requested that the FCC assign the best available channel.

== Considerations ==
Aside from the practical considerations above, there are also technical considerations which are based on the physics of the radio spectrum. These affect the radio propagation of DTV just as with other signals.

The low VHF channels from 2 to 6, while requiring the lowest power (up to 100 kW analog video or 20 kW digital), are prone to electromagnetic interference. The ATSC digital TV system has severe problems with susceptibility to impulse noise, bursts of interference which briefly render the entire channel unusable, due to its inability to instantaneously determine where in a video frame to resume display when the signal returns. The result is macroblocking and pixelation of the entire signal whenever impulse noise sources (such as motors, appliances or electrical storms) are active. They also are the lowest in frequency and therefore the longest in wavelength, requiring the largest antennas both to transmit and receive. They are also prone to atmospheric ducting, especially at night when the ground (and the air near it) cools rapidly. Because of the antenna size (a properly-sized VHF TV 2 dipole spans approximately eight feet (2.4 meters)) and the fact that there are only five channels in this band, most set-top antennas are designed to receive the higher TV bands.

Furthermore, channel 6 abuts the FM broadcast band at 88 MHz, possibly causing and receiving interference from adjacent channels. (The FCC refused to remove this band from the bandplan, because taking the high UHF channels instead would bring in more money at auction. This also contradicts what has been done in every other country that has forced a DTV transition, all giving up the VHF bands.) A completely unaddressed issue is the use of HD Radio on 88.1 FM, where the lower sideband overlaps the far upper sideband of digital TV channel 6.

The upper VHF (band III), including channels 7 to 13, is better about the above problems, but still not as good as the UHF band. By keeping these for TV, it also prevents the use of the band for Digital Audio Broadcasting, as is done with local radio stations in Europe.

The UHF band contains 55 channels from 14 to 69, which excludes channel 37 in the U.S. Channels 52 to 69 are unavailable for digital TV, on a permanent basis, leaving only 37 channels. Stations generally try to choose a lower frequency, which causes some crowding and therefore election conflicts on the lowest channels. Still, the UHF band has great advantages over VHF, in large part because of its propagation characteristics and lack of impulse noise. The shorter wavelength also means that smaller antennas are needed, an advantage for both the broadcaster and the viewer. Another advantage is that the great majority of stations use this band, requiring only one type of antenna (and sometimes amplifier) to receive all of those stations. Key disadvantages of UHF operation include the need for greater transmitter power and the reduced coverage area; the edge diffraction of signals around terrestrial obstacles degrades rapidly as frequency is increased.

== Effects ==
Channel elections generally will not affect consumers in the long run, because virtual channel numbering will keep stations appearing on their original analog channel numbers, except the times that a station has trouble transmitting PSIP metadata.

However, most ATSC tuners must re-scan for stations that change their RF channel. On some, this is as simple as manually punching in the new RF channel, at which point the decoder will read the PSIP data and re-map to the proper channel number. However, this may not delete the original mapping, leaving the original "dead" channels interleaved with the new ones (such as 5.1 old, 5.1 new, 5.2 old, 5.2 new), or possibly confusing the receiver (and the user). In many cases, a receiver will not automatically add the new mapping at all if an old one exists. Completely re-scanning will normally solve this, but may not pick up stations that are weak or temporarily off-air during the scan, causing the need to manually enter them (if this is even possible with the given receiver).

Where stations are moving to a different frequency band (such as UHF to VHF), this will affect antenna selection. Many antennas marketed for HDTV use are UHF-only or perform poorly on VHF, while many 82-channel VHF/UHF antennas are a compromise design strongly favoring VHF channels.
