= Coupon-eligible converter box =

US DTV conversion program

TV Converter Box Coupon Program
- Website type: U.S. federal government
- Available in: English, Spanish, and portion of other languages
- Dissolved: July 31, 2009; 17 years ago
- Owner: National Telecommunications and Information Administration
- Commercial: No
- Launched: January 2008; 18 years ago
- Current status: Defunct

A coupon-eligible converter box (CECB) was a digital television adapter that met eligibility specifications for subsidy "coupons" from the United States government. The subsidy program was enacted to provide terrestrial television viewers with an affordable way to continue receiving free digital terrestrial television services after the nation's television service transitioned to digital transmission and analog transmissions ceased. The specification was developed by the National Telecommunications and Information Administration (NTIA), with input from the broadcast and consumer electronics industries as well as public interest groups.

== History ==
=== Early proposals ===
In March 2005, United States House Commerce Committee chairman Joe Barton of Texas said he would introduce a bill requiring the transition to digital television "sometime in the spring", saying he wanted analog broadcasting to end on December 31, 2006. Included in his plan was a $400–$500 million subsidy for converter boxes, which were expected to cost $50 each. The subsidies were intended only for people who could not afford a pay service such as cable or satellite television. Each home would receive a rebate coupon for one box, which could be mailed to the United States Treasury for redemption. Barton estimated that 8 to 10 million converters would be needed.

=== Digital Transition and Public Safety Act of 2005 ===
The United States Digital Transition and Public Safety Act of 2005, part of the Deficit Reduction Act of 2005, required that the Federal Communications Commission (FCC) direct all full-power television stations to cease analog TV broadcasting before midnight on February 17, 2009. (This deadline later changed to June 12.) Recognizing that consumers might wish to continue receiving broadcast programming over-the-air using analog-only televisions, the Act authorized the NTIA to create a digital-to-analog converter box assistance program. Consumer education plans for the subsidy program were targeted to low-income, elderly, disabled, inner city, immigrant, and rural Americans, because these groups were more likely to use an antenna instead of cable or satellite television. The Act also established a new Treasury fund, known as the Digital Television Transition and Public Safety Fund. It directed the FCC to deposit the receipts from the spectrum auction of the returned analog television frequencies into the fund.

The Act directed the NTIA to implement and administer a program through which eligible US households could obtain a maximum of two "coupons" (actually payment vouchers) of $40 each, to be applied towards the purchase of a digital-to-analog converter box. The Act defines the term converter box to mean "a stand-alone device that does not contain features or functions except those necessary to enable a consumer to convert any channel broadcast in the digital television service into a format that the consumer can display on television receivers designed to receive and display signals only in the analog television service, but may also include a remote control device." The Act, however, did not define "eligible household".

As of April 2006, 20 million people (some with more than one set) received only over-the-air TV. When the number of people subscribing to cable or satellite who also had TVs that only used an antenna, an estimated 70 million TVs would need upgrading.

=== Implementing the program ===
In 2006, the NTIA let people see its plan for distributing coupons and comment on it. The plan prohibited people with cable or satellite service from requesting coupons. In order to get two coupons, consumers had to state that they had two television sets. In an effort to limit misconduct, coupon requests would be only be taken between January 1, 2008 and March 31, 2009; each coupon would be valid for three months. The consumer-education program only had a budget of $5 million, so the companies participating in the transition would have to help.

On March 12, 2007, the NTIA held a news conference to announce the standards for the converter boxes and the requirements for receiving coupons. With the standards established, manufacturing could begin and the NTIA could select a company to send out coupons.

With $1.5 billion in funding, the coupons would account for only half of the 73 million analog TVs not using a pay service, including 18 million in homes having only over-the-air TV reception. The Commerce Department had no plans to make coupons available only to the poor.

Coupons could be requested by phone, mail, or online. At first, anyone would be able to apply, even for those who had one or more TVs connected to cable or satellite.

The NTIA set the standards for the converter box based on what manufacturers and broadcasters wanted. LG Electronics, Thomson, Samsung, and Jasco were the first companies to announce plans to make the devices. After June 1, 2007, retailers could apply to sell converter boxes. Each would have to be in the NTIA's Central Contractor Registration database, and have been in the consumer-electronics business for at least a year.

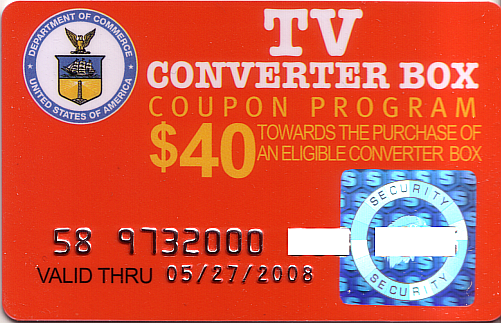
An example of the NTIA converter box $40 subsidy "coupon", which is in the form of a bank card that can only be used as payment for a converter box purchase.

To implement the coupon program, the Act authorized NTIA to use up to $990 million from the fund, including $100 million for program administration. Those funds supported an initial "non-contingent" program that was available to all requesting households. NTIA was also authorized to spend up to $1.5 billion for the program (including $160 million for administration) if the initial $990 million were insufficient to fulfill the non-contingent coupon requests. In that case, a "contingent" fund would be available for US households not serviced by cable or satellite. If the funds were insufficient, the Committee on Energy and Commerce of the House of Representatives and the Committee on Commerce, Science, and Transportation of the Senate would be notified.

An initial funding of $990 million was expected to allow all US households an opportunity to apply for the coupons, which expired 90 days after they were mailed. After that money was used up, $510 million in additional funds was available to households that stated they did not already subscribe to cable or satellite television services. Neither allotment had a means test.

The NTIA planned to start processing coupon requests a year before the original transition date of February 17, 2009; 2.4 million people had applied for 4.7 million coupons, out of an estimated 13 million homes that still received television with an antenna.

By the end of 2008, the New York Times said "about 40 million coupons have been requested, but to date 16 million have been redeemed, compared with an estimated 35 million televisions that will lose a signal." Institutions, such as retirement homes, were initially excluded from the program; while this was partially remedied (to allow one coupon per retirement-home resident), prisons, homeless shelters and residential hotels remained disqualified from the coupon program.

On January 4, 2009, the NTIA began placing coupon requests on a waiting list after the program reached its maximum allowed funding. Only after unredeemed coupons expire could new requests be fulfilled. By January 7, NTIA's waiting list included just under a million requested coupons. A week later, the list had grown to two million coupons. On January 7, both Consumers Union and Representative Ed Markey of Massachusetts (who headed the U.S. House Energy and Commerce Committee’s telecom subcommittee) advocated that the February 17, 2009 analog shutoff date be postponed, due to the lack of coupons and NTIA's inability to handle the expected public enquiries. On January 8, President-Elect Barack Obama's transition team contacted key legislators to express support for a delay, largely because of problems funding coupons for converters. The delay passed early in February (see below).

== Specifications ==
The NTIA Specification is arranged in three categories, describing required, permitted, and disqualifying features.

=== Absolute requirements ===
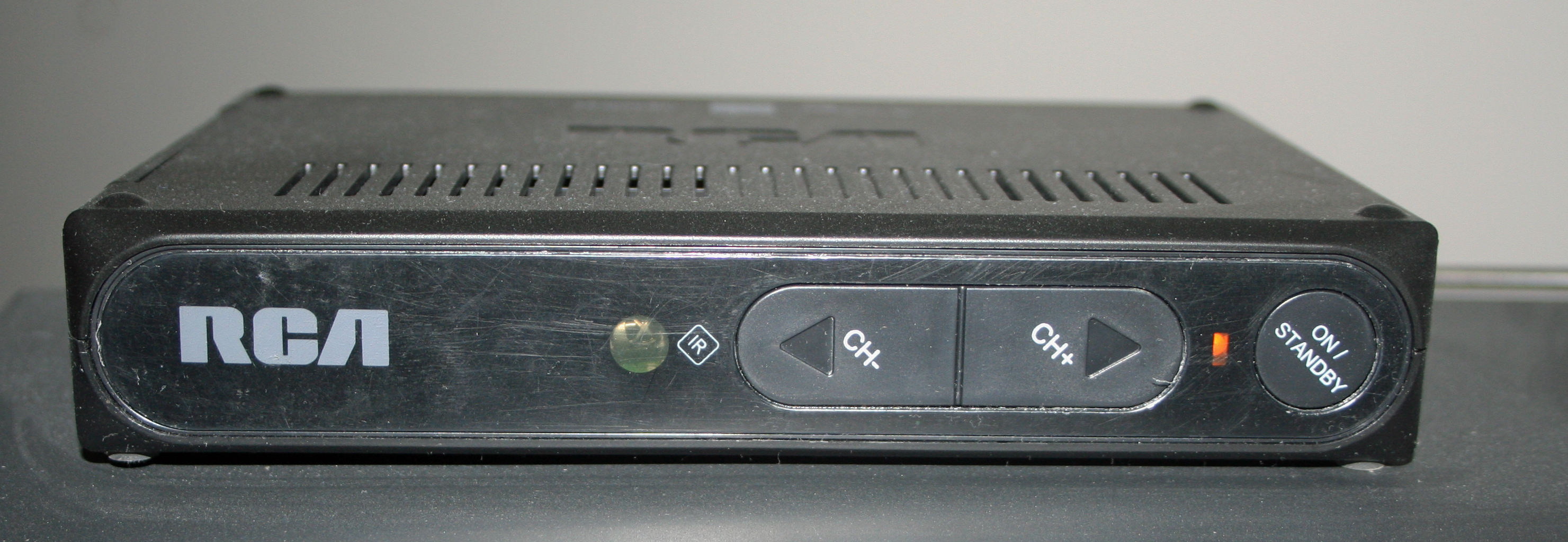
A digital TV converter box

The following features were required, but could be provided by the box in various ways.

Coupon-eligible converter boxes had to convert all ATSC (digital) formats to the traditional NTSC analog system used by analog US television sets. The box needed to output radio frequency signals (compatible with a television's antenna input), composite video, and stereo audio. It had to include a remote control, and be compatible with universal remotes.

The units had to support both a 4:3 center crop of a 16:9 transmitted image, and a letterboxed rendition of a 16:9 transmitted image. The video outputs had to produce video at an ITU-R BT.500-11 quality scale of Grade 4 or higher. Various technical performance parameters for the digital tuner were also specified.

The boxes were required to decode Emergency Alert System (EAS) messages, Closed Captioning data, and Parental Control (V-Chip) descriptors and to decode the Program and System Information Protocol (PSIP) data from the digital transmission, using it to provide the user with tuned channel and program information.

CECBs could not consume more than an average of 2 watts of power when not in use (when there was no video or audio display). They had to provide an automatic power-down option that could put the unit in standby mode when it hadn't received any commands for a period of time.

=== Optional features ===
Manufacturers could self-certify compliance with these requirements, but had to provide test results and two units to the NTIA for ad hoc testing. The FCC could also test converter boxes at the NTIA's request. Among the optional features permitted, but not required, were the following:

- Support for a smart antenna, through the use of the CEA-909 Antenna Control Interface. The manufacturer could optionally provide a promotional package discount for the combination of a smart antenna and a CECB.
- Multichannel television sound (BTSC) stereo at the RF output.
- S-Video output.
- Analog passthrough, as needed for LPTV, broadcast translator, and foreign signal reception.
- Electronic program guide
- Software updates.
- Support for the Canadian television ratings system, allowing the manufacturer to sell the same device in Canada.
- Support for secondary audio channels, such as foreign languages or Descriptive Video Service.

While an outdoor antenna is required for adequate digital reception in most locations beyond 10–25 miles (16–40 km) from TV transmitters, and smart antenna interfaces were an optionally permitted feature of coupon-eligible converter boxes, there were no subsidies for antennas. Although manufacturers could sell a converter/smart-antenna bundle, they were required to also offer the converter by itself to consumers.

DTV converter boxes could earn a United States Environmental Protection Agency Energy Star label if they consume no more than eight watts of electricity while operating, no more than one watt while in standby mode, and if they automatically power-down after four hours of inactivity.

=== Disqualifying features ===
Some features disqualified a converter box from coupon eligibility, such as high-definition video output and built-in DVR functionality. Digital cable and satellite set-top boxes that incorporate a digital tuner were also disqualified.

Certain output features were prohibited from coupon-eligible devices: component video, VGA, RGB, DVI, HDMI, USB video, IEEE-1394/iLink/FireWire video, Ethernet video, and IEEE-802.11/WiFi video outputs.

=== Limitations ===
Coupon-eligible converter boxes only tune to one channel at a time, as they only contain one digital tuner and no analog tuner. In order to watch one channel while recording another, one must have two such converter boxes, unless the recording device has its own digital TV tuner.

Most video recorders were also unable to change channels under control of built-in timers when using a converter, as channel selection was then handled by the converter. Some converter boxes have a programmable timer, which the user could program to match the recording schedule of their VCR. Then, the converter's tuner will change to the appropriate channel at the time the VCR needs to record. This requires a separate box for the VCR, or the viewer will have to watch what is being recorded. Another, less common option is an "IR blaster", which a recorder can use to control an external tuner, like a cable set-top box or converter box. However, older devices with IR blasters may not be fully compatible with digital subchannels; the converter box may require the use of a [-] or [.] button to specify the subchannel, which the pre-digital recorder may not know how to transmit. Some older TiVo brand digital recorders received software updates specifically to control digital converter boxes via the TiVo's included IR blaster.

Small battery-operated portable televisions, while valuable in time of disaster, are generally poorly suited to digital conversion. While at least one CECB (Winegard's RCDT09A) is operable from an external battery pack, the combination of television, converter, external antenna, and power supply limits portability. As of 2009, portable digital LCD TV sets cost at least $100, and could not be used while in motion at significant speeds (restoring this analog functionality would require broadcasters to transmit mobile TV via the separate ATSC-M/H standard, which would in itself require new tuners).

The inability of some boxes to add new digital channels without a full re-scan—deleting all existing channel settings—renders them unusable to viewers who rely on directional antennas and rotors to receive distant stations. Signal strength meters, where available, are awkward, typically only displaying information for channels that have already been found. This is problematic, as digital signals are most often transmitted on higher frequencies or with far less power than their analog counterparts, requiring careful antenna installation, orientation and location to avoid obstructions, fading and multipath interference problems. Where the converter fails to receive a channel, an often-cumbersome manual process is usually provided; however, this requires knowledge of which frequencies each missing station is actually transmitting on, rather than the virtual channels each is mapped to by the ATSC protocol.

Since the NTIA did not require CECBs to output MTS stereo signals via their radio-frequency output, THAT Corporation (Note: Which licensed the now-expired patents to the dbx noise reduction technology used in MTS, and still holds patents on some digital implementations of MTS) noted that consumers using RF-only connections with CECBs will lose stereo TV sound. This problem may be avoided by using the converter's line level audio outputs.

== Low-power television concerns ==
A year before the transition, Ron Bruno, president of the Community Broadcasters Association (CBA), said only four of 37 NTIA-certified converter boxes had analog passthrough, and none had analog tuners.

In late March 2008, the CBA filed a lawsuit in the U.S. Court of Appeals for the District of Columbia seeking an injunction to halt the sale and distribution of CECBs. According to the CBA, the converters' lack of support for analog transmissions would harm its member stations, which include low-power and class A television stations, as it was cost-prohibitive for many of them to convert to digital transmission. The CBA claimed that the new boxes would prevent viewers from being able to watch these analog-only stations; viewers might not even be aware such stations still existed, because the boxes would not list them. At the time of the digital transition, the FCC did not set a deadline for existing LPTV stations to convert to digital service; however, it announced that no new analog LPTV stations would be authorized.

Responding to the CBA, the FCC and NTIA urged manufacturers to include analog support voluntarily in all converter boxes. Manufacturers responded by releasing a new generation of models with the feature. Some new DVD recorders and personal video recorders also provide both analog and digital tuners, and therefore could perform the basic functions of a set-top box in both modes.

In early May 2008, the D.C. district court denied the CBA petition without comment. The CBA felt that the court wanted them to continue working with the FCC. The association said it would continue to pressure the FCC to support analog functionality as a requirement of the All-Channel Receiver Act, urge more government funding for low power and Class A broadcasters to transition to digital, and ask Congress to increase the number of such stations eligible for funds.

On August 13, 2009, the CBA announced that it would cease operations. One reason given was the cost required to fight "restrictive regulations that kept the Class A and LPTV industry from realizing its potential", including the campaign to require analog passthrough. Amy Brown, former CBA executive director, said "some 40 percent of Class A and LPTV station operators believe they will have to shut down in the next year if they are not helped through the digital transition."

In June 2010, the FCC stopped accepting new applications for digital LPTV stations while it considered the spectrum needs of the National Broadband Plan. In a Notice of Proposed Rulemaking published in September 2010, the FCC suggested setting a shutoff date for all analog TV transmissions, including LPTV stations, in 2012. It also proposed moving all low-power stations on channels 52–69 to new frequencies, to free the 700 MHz band for other uses. In April 2011, the NTIA announced that it would stop accepting applications for grants toward upgrading LPTV stations to digital transmission as of July 2, 2012. The grant program was initially funded with $44 million; as of June 2011, over $30 million in grant funding remained available.

The final deadline for LPTV Shutdown is 1 September 2015. The last NTIA grants offered to LPTV Broadcasters/Repeaters to convert their systems to digital ended in July 2012. The September 2015 deadline is to allow for possible new construction to accommodate digital equipment. Unlike the TV Full-Power Transmitter Digital Conversion in 2009, there will be no consumer subsidy program for the final LPTV digital conversion deadline since it is anticipated that without DTV Set-Top Converter Boxes, the majority of remaining SDTV/EDTV models in use should have left the consumer market by then.

== End of subsidies ==
By early January 2009, the NTIA had issued $1.34 billion worth of coupons for converter boxes, reaching the obligation limit set by the U.S. Congress in the Digital Television Transition and Public Safety Act of 2005. As a result, the NTIA started placing requests for coupons on a waiting list, issuing coupons as previously-issued but unredeemed coupons reached their expiration date.

In December 2008, FCC commissioner McDowell urged "those who don't need the government subsidy not to wait on that process before purchasing a converter box for themselves or as a gift for someone else. During the weeks it takes for the government to process coupon requests, you will lose precious time to hook up the box, check antenna connections, and start enjoying free digital broadcast TV right away."

Nielsen Media Research estimated in August 2008 that 25 percent of affected viewers would opt for inexpensive converters instead of replacing existing televisions or switching to cable and satellite television subscriptions. By November 2008, 38.3 percent were planning to buy the less-costly converter boxes.

Many retailers had stocked converters based on coupon use and shortages of the converter boxes themselves remained possible. In early February 2009, the Consumer Electronics Association estimated that three to six million converters were available, while Nielsen estimated 5.8 million American households were completely unready for digital transition. The New York Times estimated that converter supplies could run out by the end of the month. Manufacturers who had halted production ahead of the original February 17, 2009 deadline were to resume converter box assembly but this new stock was not expected in stores until April.

Legislators from the American southwest were among those supporting a delay in the digital cutover, citing safety concerns because as many as a quarter of households in television markets there had not prepared to receive digital signals by January 2009. A judge from Hildago County, Texas noted that Latino, low-income, elderly, and rural homes were at risk. Some residents could receive analog signals from Mexico; Mexico did not transition to digital transmission until the end of 2015.

=== DTV Delay Act ===
The DTV Delay Act, signed into law on February 11, 2009, extended the digital transition deadline to June 12, 2009. The DTV Delay Act did not address the shortfall in funding for converter-box coupons; the American Recovery and Reinvestment Act, part of a larger appropriations bill signed into law on February 17, 2009, added $650 million in funding—$490 million of that for coupons, increasing the total coupon-fund expenditure to $1.83 billion. By February 18, 36 percent of the United States's full-power stations had transitioned to digital-only, but five million of the nation's 115 million households remained entirely unready; at the time, 4.3 million coupon requests remained on the NTIA waiting list. The NTIA resumed issuing coupons in early March 2009, expecting to clear its backlog in two and a half weeks. Political issues had contributed to the delays in sending out coupons; the NTIA could not issue coupons above the spending limit set in the bill, even knowing that many already-issued coupons would expire. Even though unused coupons meant more money for the program, the coupons had to actually expire before the money could be "reused" for newly issued coupons. Those coupons it did send out were sent via standard mail, rather than first-class mail, as Congress had required in the legislation, but that caused coupons to be delayed up to four weeks.

The NTIA was legally required to issue coupons on a first-come, first-served basis; viewers in markets where individual stations ended analog broadcasts by the original deadline did not receive priority handling of their DTV coupon requests.

On March 24, 2009, the NTIA announced that the four-million-person waiting-list backlog had been cleared, meaning those whose coupons had expired could reapply. The NTIA estimated 17 million coupons had expired, while 25.7 million—56 percent of those issued—had been used. On April 12, Nielsen estimated that 3.6 million households remained unready.

=== Completing the transition ===
The analog shutdown for full-power TV stations was completed in mid-2009, with several stations ending analog transmissions well before the June 12, 2009 deadline. (Many transitioned on the original February 17 date.) In most cases, at least one station in each media market continued analog broadcasts for up to 30 days afterward as an "analog nightlight"—prohibited from broadcasting regular programming, but allowed to transmit information on how to obtain and connect a converter box to receive digital programming (and send Emergency Alert System broadcasts.). This allowed viewers who had not converted by the deadline to receive at least one channel that would explain the absence of the other analog channels. The nine minute public service announcement with English and Spanish segments seen on most such stations was produced by the National Association of Broadcasters.

Nielsen said 2.5 million homes were still incapable of receiving a digital signal two days after the deadline. On June 17, 2009, the NTIA said two million requested coupons had not yet been mailed.

The NTIA reported that, as of July 22, 2009, 33,578,000 coupons had been used—more than the 33.5 million possible with the original $1.34 billion allocation. $435 million of the extra money added was already owed for pending requests.

U.S. Representative Peter DeFazio and Senator Bernie Sanders introduced legislation which would have extended the converter-box coupon program beyond July 31, 2009, subsidized antennas, and require satellite and cable TV companies to provide a $10 basic-broadcast-channel package available to those who had lost the ability to receive at least one over-the-air channel because of the transition. Neither Congressman's bill was passed into law.

At midnight on July 31, 2009, the CECB program expired, without extension. Toward the end of July, consumers were making 35,000 requests for coupons per day, with just over half those issued being used. On July 30, though, the number of requests totalled 78,000, and on the final day, 169,000 were received. Requests sent via mail with a postmark of July 31 or earlier were processed; about $300 million in funding remained. By August 5, 2009, consumers had used 33,962,696 coupons.

The NTIA said 4,287,379 coupons had been requested but not redeemed. As of August 12, $310,796,690 was available, and if all requested coupons were redeemed, $139,300,174 would be left.

An unidentified NTIA source said the agency returned $241.6 million to the Treasury Department; $2.6 million went to "final closeout costs". After the program ended, $250 million from the original bill had not been used, and the additional $490 million allocated in February 2009 had not been touched. These funds almost equalled the $490 million Congress had appropriated to boost the program in January 2008, when it appeared the program would run out of money. The additional funding was needed to satisfy the accounting rules imposed on the program by Congress, rather than an actual need for the funds. The unused funds from the original bill went to a DTV public safety fund, as required in the legislation.
