= All-Channel Receiver Act =

United States legislation

- Long title: An Act to amend the Communications Act of 1934 in order to give the Federal Communications Commission certain regulatory authority over television receiving apparatus.
- Acronyms (colloquial): ACRA
- Nicknames: All-Channels Act
- Enacted by: the 87th United States Congress

Citations
- Public law: Pub. L. 87–529
- Statutes at Large: 76 Stat. 150

Codification
- Acts amended: Communications Act of 1934
- Titles amended: 47
- U.S.C. sections created: 47 U.S.C. § 330
- U.S.C. sections amended: 47 U.S.C. § 303

Legislative history
- Signed into law by President John F. Kennedy on July 10, 1962

The All-Channel Receiver Act of 1962 (ACRA) (47 U.S.C. § 303(s)), commonly known as the All-Channels Act, was passed by the United States Congress in 1961, to allow the Federal Communications Commission to require that all television set manufacturers must include UHF tuners, so that new UHF-band TV stations (then channels 14 to 83) could be received by the public. This was a problem at the time since most affiliated stations of the Big Three television networks (ABC, CBS, NBC) were well-established on VHF, while many local-only stations on UHF were struggling for survival.

The All-Channel Receiver Act provides that the Federal Communications Commission shall "have authority to require that apparatus designed to receive television pictures broadcast simultaneously with sound be capable of adequately receiving all frequencies allocated by the Commission to television broadcasting." Under authority provided by the All Channel Receiver Act, the FCC adopted a number of technical standards to increase parity between the UHF and VHF television services, including a 14 dB maximum UHF noise figure for television receivers.

== History ==
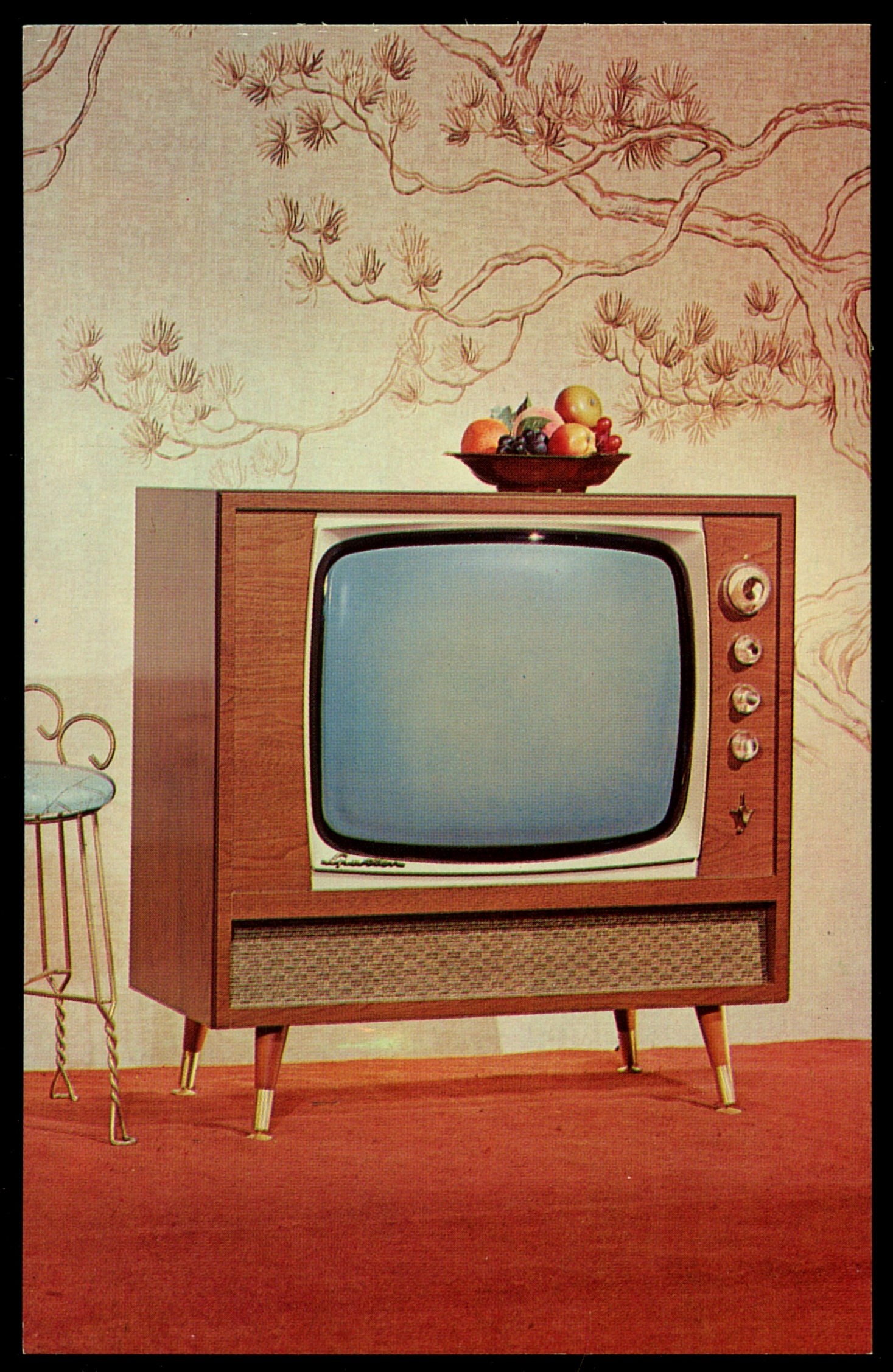
Sparton "Kingsway" television set (model 23L1T), c. 1965. Under the All-Channel Receiver Act, this set was required to have a UHF tuner.

While the first U.S. commercially licensed UHF television stations signed on as early as 1952, the majority of the 165 UHF stations to begin telecasting between 1952 and 1959 did not survive. UHF local stations of the 1950s were limited by the range their signals could supposedly travel, the lack of UHF tuners in most TV sets and difficulties in finding advertisers and TV network affiliations. Of the 82 new UHF TV stations in the United States broadcasting as of June 1954, only 24 remained on the air a year later.

Fourth-network operators such as the DuMont Television Network, forced to expand using UHF affiliates due to a lack of available VHF channels, were not viable and soon folded. The fraction of new TV receivers that were factory-equipped with all-channel tuners dropped from 20% in 1953 to 9.0% by 1958, a drop that was only partially compensated for by field upgrades or the availability of UHF converters for separate purchase. By 1961, with 83 commercial UHF stations still on-air, the number of new TVs capable of receiving UHF as well as VHF channels had fallen to a record low of 5.5% with a small number of viable stations situated in localities where a lack of available VHF frequencies had forced early expansion onto UHF.

While public educational television was available from 105 US stations by 1965, many of them in the already-crowded VHF spectrum, only 18 percent of the large number of UHF frequencies reserved for educational use in US cities were in active use. In areas where audiences had no UHF receivers, a station broadcasting above channel 13 was unlikely to survive.

Under the All-Channel Receiver Act, FCC regulations would ensure that all new TV sets sold in the U.S. after 1964 had built-in UHF tuners. By 1971, there would be more than 170 full-service UHF broadcast stations nationwide; the number of UHF stations would grow further to accommodate new television networks such as the Public Broadcasting Service (1970), Fox (1986), Univision (1986) and Telemundo (1987).

Today, UHF TV stations outnumber their long-established VHF counterparts, with more stations switching to physical UHF channels after the digital TV transition of 2009.

== Digital television ==
The act has most recently been used in 2005-2007 (47 CFR 15.115 and 47 CFR 15.117) to require TV manufacturers to include ATSC-T (terrestrial TV) tuners for digital television, in any TV set that includes an NTSC analog TV tuner. This requirement has been phased-in during the mid-2000s, starting with the largest TV sets. By early 2007, every device sold that was capable of receiving over-the-air TV (including VCRs) was required to include an ATSC tuner. Millions of dollars in fines were imposed in 2008 by the Federal Communications Commission against vendors, including various name-brand retail chains such as Best Buy, Sears/Kmart and Walmart. Best Buy is disputing both the fines and the authority of the FCC to impose the penalties; Circuit City and Sears also disputed the charges.

In late March 2008, the Community Broadcasters Association filed a lawsuit in the U.S. Court of Appeals for the District of Columbia, seeking an injunction to halt the sale and distribution of DTV converter boxes, charging that their failure to include analog tuners or analog passthrough violates the All-Channel Receiver Act. Responding to CBA's actions, the FCC and NTIA urged manufacturers to include the feature voluntarily in all converter boxes, and manufacturers responded by releasing a new generation of models with the feature. In early May 2008, the D.C. district court denied the CBA petition without comment, effectively telling the association that it had not exhausted all its efforts, and that there was not enough merit to take the case to the courts.

In July 2010, the FCC granted a waiver allowing Dell, LG, and Hauppauge to fail to include tuners for NTSC analog TV or standard ATSC digital TV in mobile television devices designed to receive ATSC-M/H signals. While all full-power stations have been forced to turn off their analog signals, and most low-power TV stations therefore have been forced to digital as the de facto standard, the vast majority of stations do not transmit a mobile-TV signal, which will leave viewers with these devices unable to receive most broadcasts. Because LPTV stations have already had their limited financial resources drained by having to buy and install new digital equipment, it is unlikely that any LPTV stations will be seen on mobile TV because of this waiver, which also applies to other companies.

== Broadcast radio ==
It has been proposed in 2009 to require HD Radio receivers to be included in all satellite radio (SDARS) receivers, in response to the monopoly created by the XM/Sirius merger. All three use proprietary systems, and there have been no considerations to require the inclusion of open standards like FMeXtra, DRM+, DAB+ or DMB, which are compatible anywhere outside of the United States. A notice of inquiry (a predecessor to a full rulemaking proceeding) is before the FCC as docket 08-172. A bill had been submitted to the U.S. House as the Radio All Digital Channel Receiver Act in 2008 but was not passed into law.

== See also ==
- Ultra high frequency
- DTV transition in the United States
