= ATSC tuner =

Tuner for digital television channels

Multiple MPEG programs are combined then sent to a transmitting antenna. In the US broadcast digital TV system, an ATSC receiver then decodes the TS and displays it on a TV.

An ATSC (Advanced Television Systems Committee) tuner, often called an ATSC receiver or HDTV tuner, is a type of television tuner that allows reception of digital television (DTV) television channels that use ATSC standards, as transmitted by television stations in North America (including parts of Central America) and South Korea. Such tuners are usually integrated into a television set, VCR, digital video recorder (DVR), or set-top box which provides audio/video output connectors of various types.

Another type of television tuner is a digital television adapter (DTA) with an analog passthrough.

== Technical overview ==
The terms "tuner" and "receiver" are used loosely, and it is perhaps more appropriately called an ATSC receiver, with the tuner being part of the receiver (see Metonymy). The receiver generates the audio and video (AV) signals needed for television, and performs the following tasks: demodulation; error correction; MPEG transport stream demultiplexing; decompression; AV synchronization; and media reformatting to match what is optimal input for one's TV. Examples of media reformatting include: interlace to progressive scan or vice versa; picture resolutions; aspect ratio conversions (16:9 to or from 4:3); frame rate conversion; and image scaling. Zooming is an example of resolution change. It is commonly used to convert a low-resolution picture to a high-resolution display. This lets the user eliminate letterboxing or pillarboxing by stretching or cropping the picture. Some ATSC receivers, mostly those in HDTV TV sets, will stretch automatically, either by detecting black bars or by reading the Active Format Description (AFD).

== Operation ==
An ATSC tuner works by generating audio and video signals that are picked up from over-the-air broadcast television. ATSC tuners provide the following functions: selective tuning; demodulation; transport stream demultiplexing; decompression; error correction; analog-to-digital conversion; AV synchronization; and media reformatting to fit the specific type of TV screen optimally.

=== Selective tuning ===
Selective tuning is the process by which the radio frequency (RF) of the television channel is selected by a receiver from within a band of transmitted RF signals. The tuner usually performs the function of frequency-agile selection, along with rejection of unwanted out-of-band signals.

=== Demodulation ===
"Demodulation" means transforming the signal from the tuner into a signal that a TV set can use to produce images and sound without further consideration for the frequency at which it was transmitted. It is separation of a standard baseband signal from the RF carrier that was used to transmit it through the air (or down a coaxial cable or other long-distance medium.) ATSC as implemented in the US uses 8VSB modulation, which requires less power to transmit, as opposed to the also proposed COFDM modulation (used in European DVB-T, which is less prone to multipath distortion and therefore better received in mobile installations).

=== Transport stream ===
In the US, multiple digital signals are combined and then transmitted from one antenna source to create over the air broadcasts. By the reverse process (demultiplexing), an ATSC receiver first receives the combined MPEG transport stream and then decodes it to display one of its component signals on a TV set.

=== Decompression ===
Since digital signals that are broadcast over the air are compressed (packed smaller), once they are received by the ATSC tuner, these compressed packets of digital data are then decompressed (unpacked to their original size). The ATSC system uses lossy compression, so while the decompressed data size is the same as the original compressed data size, the data produced is not exactly the same as the original data fed into the system at the transmitting site, but it is close enough that most people will not notice a difference.

=== Error correction ===
Error correction is a technology that is used by the ATSC tuner to make sure that any data that is missing can be corrected. For instance, sometimes interference or a poor-quality signal will cause the loss of some data that the ATSC tuner receives. With error correction, the tuner has the ability to perform a number of checks and repair data so that a signal can be viewed on a TV set. Error correction works by adding some extra information to the signal before transmission that can be used upon reception to fill in gaps. Therefore, error correction has the opposite effect of compression—it increases the amount of data to transmit, rather than reducing it like compression does, and it improves the quality and robustness of the signal rather than reducing it. Compression removes redundant (and some non-redundant) data, while error correction adds some redundant data. The reason for using error correction rather than just using less compression and keeping the redundancy that was already there is that error correction systems are specially designed to get the maximum benefit out of a very small amount of redundant data, whereas the natural redundancy of the data doesn't do this job as efficiently, so with error correction the net amount of data needed is still smaller.

- The ATSC standard (ATSC-E) has a subsection that allows broadcasters to add extra (and variable types) of error correction to their broadcast streams.
- This error correction service is not mandatory in the US, nor is it mandatory in Canada.
- It is not known how many HDTV receivers support this error correction standard.
- For the transmission of HDTV at 720 or 1080, an extra 1% to 3% added error correction codes will help reduce some of ATSC's poorer performance with weak signals under adverse multipath conditions.
- Reception is greatly reduced due to EMI in the shortwave to VHF and UHF bandwidth from nearby computers of all sorts [light], portable WiFi and Broadband internet [medium to strong], microwave ovens [burst while activated], cell phones and the towers they communicate with, and even power lines with electronic transmissions.

=== AV synchronization ===
AV synchronization is the coordination of audio and video signals being displayed on a digital TV in proper time. AV synchronization ensures that the audio does not lag behind the video that is being displayed on the TV set or vice versa, so that both audio and video are in sync.

=== Image reformatting ===
Media reformatting is extremely important because the formatting of images on TV sets differs significantly according to the technology employed. For instance, some televisions have an interlaced picture, whereas others have a progressive-scan picture. Different televisions have a different aspect ratio.

== United States government mandates ==
The FCC has issued the following mandates for devices entering the US:

- By July 1, 2005 all televisions with screen sizes over 36 inches (91 cm) must include a built-in ATSC DTV tuner.
- By March 1, 2006 all televisions with screen sizes over 25 inches (64 cm) must include a built-in ATSC DTV tuner.
- By March 1, 2007 all televisions regardless of screen size, and all interface devices that include a tuner (VCR, DVD player/recorder, DVR) must include a built-in ATSC DTV tuner.

Devices manufactured before these dates can still be sold without a built-in ATSC DTV tuner; the lack of digital tuners legally must be disclosed to consumers and most name-brand retailers have incurred FCC penalties for non-compliance with these requirements.

The current regulations are specified in the U.S. Code of Federal Regulations (CFR).

=== Analog TV broadcast switch-off ===
In early 2006 the US Deficit Reduction Act of 2005 became law, which calls for full-power over-the-air television stations to cease their analog broadcasts by February 17, 2009 (this cut-off date had been moved several times previously). On February 11, 2009, the mandatory DTV broadcast date was moved again to June 12, 2009, although stations were allowed to switch earlier. The delay enabled distribution of more coupons for purchase of converter boxes.

As of June 12, 2009, TVs and other equipment with legacy NTSC tuners are unable to receive over-the-air broadcasts from United States TV stations, unless the broadcast is from a repeater or low-power transmitter. However, Class-A stations shut down analog transmissions on September 1, 2015 followed by a complete shutdown of all low-power and repeater stations by July 13, 2021. Canada had a similar analog TV termination date set to September 1, 2011 (except in some remote northern regions).

It was feared that the US switch-off would cause millions of non-cable- and non-satellite-connected TV sets to "go dark". Viewers who did not upgrade, either to a television with a digital tuner or a set-top box, ended up losing their only source of television, unless they relied only upon the aforementioned non-full-power broadcasters. A Congressional bill authorized subsidized converter boxes in a way that allowed viewers to receive the new digital broadcasts on their old TVs. The transition proceeded with about 235,000 people requesting coupons after the June 12, 2009, transition date.

Two $40 coupons were made available per US address nominally from January 1, 2008, through March 31, 2009; each coupon could be used toward the purchase of one approved coupon-eligible converter box. The coupons expired 90 days after initial mailing and were not renewable. All households were eligible to receive coupons from the initial $990 million allocated, after which an additional $510 million in coupons was to be available to households that rely exclusively on over-the-air television reception. On January 4, 2009, the coupon program reached its US$1.34 billion ceiling and any further consumer requests were placed on a waiting list.

== Canadian government mandates ==
In Canada, the Canadian Radio-television and Telecommunications Commission (CRTC) had set August 31, 2011, as the date on which over-the-air analog TV transmission service would cease in 31 major markets of the country, including all provincial capitals, plus Ottawa (the national capital), and most other major urban centers.

As of the end of 2008, there were 22 Canadian DTV transmitters on-air and all existing digital transitional television licenses explicitly proscribe, as a condition of license, the broadcast of more than fourteen hours a week of programming not already on the analogue service. Unlike in the United States, there is no plan to subsidise ATSC converter purchases and no requirement that newly imported receivers decode the digital signal. Canadian retailers are also not required to disclose the inability of new equipment to receive DTV. The Canadian market therefore has been flooded with obsolete new NTSC equipment which lawfully cannot be exported to the US. A limited number of ATSC receivers are in Canadian retail stores as high-definition television (HDTV) receivers. ATSC CECB converter boxes were first carried nationally in October 2008, with chains such as Best Buy and Home Hardware offering limited selection at higher prices than in the US with no government subsidies. ATSC tuners may also be present in most recently manufactured televisions, as well as DVD recorders, HDTV FTA receivers, and personal computer TV tuner cards.

As of the beginning of 2012, almost all Canadian broadcasters are broadcasting an ATSC signal, with a handful of exceptions granted for low-power and regional stations. These signals can be reliably tuned in most cities with a good indoor antenna and an ATSC tuner. US-based ATSC signals can be reliably tuned with an outdoor antenna and an ATSC tuner in Canadian markets within 60 miles of the US broadcast towers. These markets include Toronto (from Buffalo), Windsor (from Detroit and Toledo), Vancouver (from Seattle and Tacoma), Montreal (from Burlington and Plattsburgh), Ottawa (from Watertown and Plattsburgh), and Fredericton (from Presque Isle). Indoor antennas (both passive and amplified) are easier to install, but outdoor antennas are better at tuning stations from further distances.

== Setup and operation ==
Most ATSC tuners have relatively simple on-screen menus, and automatically bring the user to a setup screen when turned on for the first time. This allows the user to pick the time zone and daylight-saving time mode (as all stations transmit time in UTC), and bandscan for stations. The scan "listens" on every channel from 2 to 69, and pauses when it detects a digital carrier wave. If it is able to decode the station, it reads its PSIP data, and adds its virtual channels to the channel map. If no PSIP is transmitted, the physical channel number is used, and each transport stream is enumerated according to its TSID (converted from hexadecimal), or starting sequentially at .1, .2, .3, and so forth, depending on the tuner.

Several TV stations are using or have used a temporary channel to send their DTV signals and, upon terminating analog transmission, move their digital transmission either back to their old analog channel, or to a third channel (sometimes the former analog of another local station), chosen in the digital channel election in the U.S. This requires all viewers to re-scan or manually add the new channel and possibly delete the old one. Doing a full re-scan will usually cause other channels to be dropped if they cannot be received at the moment the scan passes their physical channel, so this is typically undesirable, although many ATSC tuners only have this option. Some have an "easy-add" feature which does not delete what is already mapped in memory. Some allow the user to enter the physical channel and an unmapped subchannel, causing the tuner to search the physical channel. Depending on the tuner, this may or may not automatically add the station and its digital subchannels to the map, and/or to the user's "favorites". This may also leave the old "dead" channel mapping in place, so that there is the new 8.1, dead 8.1, new 8.2, dead 8.2, etc. In most cases, TV stations will not have the actual frequency they are currently using on their website. If the auto scan does not pick up the signal and the tuner has manual frequency scan capability try to get the actual frequency from the station engineer. This may allow one to stay on one frequency (channel) versus "scanning" (moving too quickly through) and allow one to make antenna adjustments while observing only a problematic channel.

Other errors which appear to be in the tuner are actually the result of incorrect data sent by one or more stations, often including missing electronic program guide data. Many ATSC tuners will remember EPG info for each station, but only for a few hours after viewing a channel on that station. Some will not remember at all (displaying only the required channel banner), while a very few others will store data for days (although this requires staying tuned to each station for more than a few seconds in order to receive the extended info). DirecTV receivers with ATSC tuners can download the guide at any time, while other TiVo units download guide data separately. TV Guide On Screen can also be used for this, but very few if any ATSC tuners include this (which requires downloading all guide data for all channels from one particular station). Stations sending the wrong time are also a major problem, as this can skew or ruin guide data for all stations until the correct time is received again from a different and correctly set station.

== Manual tuning ==
Each digital OTA channel number is composed of a main number and a subchannel, for example 4.1, 4.2, etc. A dash is an alternate form of representation: 4–1, 4–2... The dot and dash are interchangeable; they both mean the same thing. The main channel numbers refer to the same radio frequencies as previously. However, now "virtual channel" (technically known as logical channel number) numbers are common. So, Channel 4 digital signals may now actually be broadcast on channel 43, or any other frequency. When the ATSC tuner does a channel scan, it finds the signal on channel 43, learns that this material is called "Channel 4", and remembers that mapping. The user can tune to "4", and the tuner will know to tune in 43. Before a scan is done, it may be possible to access the programs directly by manual tuning, by entering 43–1, 43–2... After the scan, the programs would usually be accessed by entering 4–1, 4-2 etc., but it may still be possible to also access them directly at 43 as long as it is also not the same as an already assigned channel. If stations change their broadcast frequencies, it may be possible to access the new frequencies directly as long as it is also not the same as an already assigned channel in which case it will go to that channel instead of the frequency, but the usual procedure is to re-scan all of the channels which will just assign multiple version of any overlapping channels.

== See also ==
- ATSC DVD recorders
- Digital broadcasting
- Digital switchover
- Digital terrestrial television
- High-definition television in the United States
- QAM tuner
- Tuner (radio)
- Virtual channel

== Bibliography ==
- "Over the air digital television reception FAQ". AVS forum. 29 March 2002. Archived from the original on 2006-05-22.
- "Understanding broadband silicon tuners for broadband cable and TV apps: A Tutorial". Digital TV Designline. 2006-05-17. Archived from the original on 2007-09-28.
- "Tentative Digital Television (DTV) Channel assignment".
- "Television Frequency Table".
