= Channel 51 =

Channel 51 may refer to several television stations:

- Channel 51 (New Zealand), a regional television station based in Napier, Hawke's Bay, New Zealand

== Canada ==
The following television stations formerly broadcast on digital channel 51 (UHF frequencies covering 693.25-697.75 MHz) in Canada :

- CBWFT-DT in Winnipeg, Manitoba
- CHCH-DT-2 in London, Ontario

The following television stations operate on virtual channel 51 in Canada:

- CHCH-DT-2 in London, Ontario
- CKEM-DT in Edmonton, Alberta

== See also ==
- Channel 51 TV stations in Mexico
- Channel 51 virtual TV stations in the United States
- Channel 51 low-power TV stations in the United States
