= Passthrough (electronics) =

In signal processing, a passthrough is a logic gate that enables a signal to "pass through" unaltered, sometimes with little alteration. Sometimes the concept of a "passthrough" can also involve daisy chain logic.

== Examples of passthroughs ==
- Analog passthrough (for digital TV)
- Sega 32X (passthrough for Sega Genesis video games)
- VCRs, DVD recorders, etc. act as a "pass-through" for composite video and S-video, though sometimes they act as an RF modulator for use on Channel 3.
- Tape monitor features allow an AV receiver (sometime the recording device itself) to act as a "pass-through" for audio.
- An AV receiver usually allows pass-through of the video signal while amplifying the audio signal to drive speakers.

== See also ==
- Dongle, a device that converts signal, instead of just being a "passthrough" for unaltered signal
