= Conyers v. Bush =

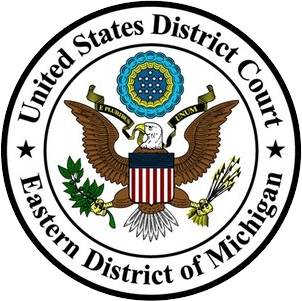
- Court: United States District Court for the Eastern District of Michigan
- Full case name: Honorable John Conyers, Jr., et al., Plaintiffs v. George W. Bush, et al., Defendants
- Citation: ED Mi No. 06-11972

Court membership
- Judge sitting: Nancy Garlock Edmunds

Honorable John Conyers, Jr., et al. v. George W. Bush, et al., No. 2:06-CV-11972, 2006 WL 3834224 (E.D. Mich. 2006), was a lawsuit in which Rep. John Conyers Jr. and others alleged that President George W. Bush violated the United States Constitution by signing a bill that was not passed by the United States Congress.

== Nature of claim ==
John Conyers, a ranking member of the House Judiciary Committee, along with 10 other members of Congress, filed a lawsuit on April 28, 2006, at the district court in Detroit seeking a restraining order (injunctive relief) preventing the execution of the Deficit Reduction Act of 2005, S. 1932. The plaintiffs also sought a declaration that the bill be declared unconstitutional and not a valid law.

== Parties ==
=== Plaintiffs ===
- John Conyers
- John Dingell
- George Miller
- Charles Rangel
- Collin Peterson
- Bennie Thompson
- Jim Oberstar
- Barney Frank
- Pete Stark
- Sherrod Brown
- Louise Slaughter

=== Defendants ===
- George W. Bush
- Agriculture Secretary Mike Johanns
- Commerce Secretary Carlos Gutierrez
- Education Secretary Margaret Spellings
- Homeland Security Secretary Michael Chertoff
- Housing Secretary Alphonso Jackson
- Transportation Secretary Norman Y. Mineta
- Treasury Secretary John W. Snow

== Outcome ==
The case was dismissed on November 6, 2006, by federal judge Nancy Garlock Edmunds in Detroit, who cited the representatives' lack of standing to bring this suit.

== See also ==
- Jim Zeigler
- Presentment Clause
