= Community Broadcasters Association =

US trade organization

The Community Broadcasters Association (CBA) was a trade organization representing low-power broadcasting interests, including LPTV and Class A television stations, in the United States of America. It ceased operations in 2009.

== History ==
Key issues addressed by the CBA included the provision of interference protection for small broadcasters (for which it successfully petitioned the FCC for creation of the "Class A" designation in 1998) and the need for analog passthrough in coupon-eligible converter boxes (it had unsuccessfully pursued legal action claiming that the absence of this feature, needed to avoid blocking signals from low-power and foreign stations not converting to digital in 2009, violates the All-Channel Receiver Act of 1961).

CBA's lawsuit seeking an injunction to halt the sale and distribution of DTV converter boxes lacking analog tuners and analog passthrough was filed in March 2008 but denied without comment in the U.S. Court of Appeals for the District of Columbia in May 2008. The FCC and NTIA urged manufacturers to include analog pass-through voluntarily in all converter boxes, and some of the newest generation of models now offer the feature.

Due to the large number of public service announcements on full-service stations, which often confusingly claimed that "all TV is going digital" on February 17, 2009, the CBA established websites such as KeepUsOn.com to notify consumers of the continued post-transition operation of analogue LPTV, with information on how to find and install converters which offered analogue pass-through capability.

The CBA also advocated that existing Class A stations be permitted to upgrade to full service status, obtaining the same must-carry access to cable television that was available to full-power broadcasters, and (like full-power broadcasters) opposed expansion of the FM radio band into the frequency range currently occupied by TV channels 5 and 6.

Amy Brown was the executive director of the Community Broadcasters Association when it closed. The corresponding advocacy role for U.S. full-service television stations is filled by the National Association of Broadcasters.

== See also ==
- Class A television service
- Broadcast relay station
- Low-power broadcasting
- DTV transition in the United States
