= Channel 51 low-power TV stations in the United States =

The following low-power television stations broadcast on digital or analog channel 51 in the United States:

- K51DR-D in Wenatchee, Washington
- K51KR in Billings, Montana
- KXAD-LD in Amarillo, Texas, to move to channel 23

The following television stations, which are no longer licensed, formerly broadcast on digital or analog channel 51:

- K51AE in Monitor, etc., Washington
- K51AQ-D in Ukiah, California
- K51BD in Ellensburg, Washington
- K51CP in Swauger Creek, California
- K51EB in Seiling, Oklahoma
- K51GB in Santa Maria, California
- K51GG in Delta/Oak City, etc., Utah
- K51JC in Huntsville, Utah
- K54GK in Sioux City, Iowa
- KAUI-LP in Wailuku, Hawaii
- KPKS-LP in San Angelo, Texas
- KTJA-LP in Victoria, Texas
- KULX-LP in Ogden, Utah
- W51CB in Burlington, Vermont
- W51CV in Utica, New York
- W51CW-D in Wilmington, North Carolina
- W51DF in Manteo, North Carolina
- W51DO in Hampton, Virginia
- W51DU in Lafayette, Indiana
- WNHX-LP in New Haven, Connecticut
