= Digital Transition and Public Safety Act of 2005 =

US Congress legislation

The Digital Television Transition and Public Safety Act of 2005 is a United States Congress legislation enacted on February 8, 2006. This act deals with the cessation of the broadcasting of analog television and the subsequent implementation of digital television. This transition took place on June 12, 2009, which had been scheduled for February 17, 2009.

== Introduction ==
The act was a part of the Deficit Reduction Act of 2005 (S.1932), Title III. It also provided for an auction of the recovered frequencies, and for a sum of $7.3 billion to be transferred to the U.S. Treasury from the money received.

== Digital-analog converter box coupon program ==
Each American household was able to request up to two coupons worth $40 to facilitate the purchase of digital-analog converter boxes. These requests for coupons could be submitted between the dates January 1, 2008 and March 31, 2009, inclusive.

== See also ==
- Digital cable
- Digital television
