= Analog passthrough =

Electronics

Analog passthrough is a feature found on some digital-to-analog television converter boxes. Boxes without the analog passthrough feature only allow older, analog-only TVs to view digital TV. Those with analog pass-through allow both digital and analog television to be viewed on older TVs.

Before digital television, passthrough originally existed in VCRs (and later PVRs and DVDRs) that connected to a TV set using RF connector, allowing the TV antenna or cable TV signal to be switched to pass through the VCR, or have VCR output added as an extra channel.

== The problem ==
All digital-to-analog converter boxes have both an antenna input (which accepts the coaxial cable that formerly went directly to the TV) and an RF output (which now goes directly to the TV). They may also have additional outputs. Any converter box converts the digital signal for the current digital sub-channel to an analog signal (at the reduced screen resolution of the analog standard), outputs that signal onto analog channel 3 or 4 (set by the user to avoid any conflict with local over-the-air channels) and sends that signal to the analog tuner on the TV. With a box that lacks analog passthrough, no other signals are sent to the output, so all analog stations are lost.

In the US, this primarily affects low-power and broadcast translator stations, as these are exempt from the FCC mandate to switch to digital broadcasting in 2009, as well as foreign signals that will remain in analog form. A small number of TV receivers were also manufactured with built-in broadcast radio receivers; these included some small portable devices or (more rarely) sets marketed for hotel/motel use. If used with DTV converter boxes, these will need analog passthrough in order not to block incoming FM radio signals.

== The solution ==
Some converter boxes offer analog pass-through, meaning that the same output cable which carries the converted digital signal (on analog channel 3 or 4) while the converter is operating also retains all remaining analog signals upon turning the converter box off.

While this typically works to some extent with the converter box on, there is often significant signal strength reduction and/or interference on the original analog channels.

Analog pass-through signals are passed only to the coax output, not to any other outputs provided by the unit. While other converter outputs may still be connected and used for digital TV reception, the coaxial RF output must remain connected to pass analog TV signals.

Some VCRs and TVs have receivers that detect active composite video or S-video connections. When they detect these connections, they are designed to accept signals only from those sources, which can cause issues with the described arrangement. In such a case, the two options would be to use the coax output exclusively, either when viewing analog TV only (which requires plugging and unplugging cables) or full-time (with the reduced digital TV quality produced using the coax output).

The majority of TVs have a button on the unit and/or remote labeled something like "TV/VIDEO", "INPUT" or "AUX", which manually switches between coax and other sources. This eliminates problems when using both sets of connections simultaneously.

== United States implementation ==
In the US, conversion to digital TV from analog was complete by June 12, 2009.

Unfortunately, only one of the initially available converter boxes included this feature, and a year before the original transition date of February 17, 2009, Community Broadcasters Association president Ron Bruno said four of the 32 NTIA-certified boxes had the feature. In late March 2008, the CBA filed a lawsuit in the U.S. Court of Appeals for the District of Columbia, seeking an injunction to halt the sale and distribution of DTV converter boxes, charging that their failure to include analog tuners or analog passthrough violates the All-Channel Receiver Act. CBA maintained that the lack of analog support would seriously harm the LPTV and class A television stations the group represents, as it is cost-prohibitive for many or most of them to convert to digital transmissions, and the new boxes would prevent viewers from being able to watch (or even being aware of the existence of) their analog-only stations.

Responding to CBA's actions, the FCC and NTIA urged manufacturers to include the feature voluntarily in all converter boxes, and manufacturers responded by releasing a new generation of models with the feature. Some new DVD recorders and personal video recorders also provide both analog and digital tuners, and could therefore perform the basic functions of a set-top box in both modes.

In early May 2008, the D.C. district court denied the CBA petition without comment.[8] The court's decision implied that the association had not exhausted all its efforts. Furthermore, the court believed there wasn't enough merit to bring the case forward. The CBA responded by concentrating its lobbying efforts on the FCC and by urging more funding for low-power and Class A broadcasters to transition to digital, asking Congress to increase the number of such stations eligible for funds.

== See also ==
- All-Channel Receiver Act
- Composite video and S-video
- Set-top box and coupon-eligible converter box
