= Deficit Reduction Act of 2005 =

United States Act of Congress

The Deficit Reduction Act of 2005 is a United States Act of Congress concerning the federal budget that became law in 2006.

== Legislative history ==
The Senate's version passed after a tie-breaking vote was cast by Vice President Dick Cheney. The bill passed the chamber with all Democrats and five Republicans voting against the bill. The House version passed by a vote of 217–215, with all Democrats, fourteen Republicans, and one Independent voting against. The Senate bill was signed by President George W. Bush on February 8, 2006.

=== Dispute over legal status ===
A dispute quickly arose, as it turned out the two houses of Congress had not approved exactly same bill.

As argued by the organization Public Citizen in a lawsuit over the Act, the Senate clerk had mistakenly changed a clause related to Medicare reimbursements when transmitting the engrossed bill to the House. So when the House voted to accept the Senate's version of the bill, the House clerk had different text than the Senate had approved. When the bill was returned to the Senate the clerk there restored the text as previously voted on by the Senate. That version was signed by the presiding officers of Congress and by the President.

The clerk was aware of the mistake, and had informed Republican House leadership of the error that January, several weeks before the final vote was to take place in the House. Normally this type of error in communication between the houses of Congress would be resolved by sending the legislation back to the Senate to be corrected. Instead, the Republican leadership brought the bill to the floor on February 1, without revealing the discrepancy to either the Democratic leadership or the body of the House.

After this, in the process of the "restored" version being transmitted to the President, according to Rep. Henry Waxman, "House Speaker Dennis Hastert and President pro tempore of the Senate Ted Stevens signed a statement attesting that the legislation had been passed by both the Senate and the House. These leaders signed this statement despite the fact that the Republican leadership in both bodies knew that this was not true."

Many argued that the document signed by the President did not have the force of law because the enacting process bypassed the Bicameral Clause of the U.S. Constitution. Henry Waxman (D-CA) wrote a letter to Minority Leader (later Speaker) Nancy Pelosi on February 14, 2006, saying three experts he consulted (Professor Gerhardt, Professor Dorf, Professor Raskin) said the law was clearly unconstitutional. At least five individuals or organizations sued to overturn the act, or parts of it they disagreed with, including Public Citizen, attorney James Zeigler, and education finance company OneSimpleLoan.

Congressional leaders and administration officials cited the enrolled bill rule in defense of the Act. An 1892 Supreme Court case, Field v. Clark (143 U.S. 649 (1892)) said disputes over differing versions of a bill that were certified by both chambers were not for the courts to decide. All courts to consider the question, including the Federal District Court of Eastern Michigan in Conyers v. Bush, ruled that the Act was valid notwithstanding the controversy or that opponents did not have standing to sue. The Supreme Court declined invitations to reconsider or overrule the enrolled bill rule.

The difference between the two versions is the provision regarding the length of time that Medicare would be required to pay for durable medical equipment such as wheelchairs and oxygen equipment like CPAP machines. The Senate version of the bill restricted payments to 13 months while the House version provided for 36 months, a $2 billion difference. Just prior to the filing of the bill in the House, a change was required to alter these time periods, in three places the number 13 was changed to 36, by hand in the offices controlled by the Speaker. The change was needed to assure the requisite number of votes for passage in the Senate. This hand written drafting change gave rise to the error made by the Senate clerk later in the process.

== Provisions ==
The Act purported to save nearly $40 billion over five years from mandatory spending programs through slowing the growth in spending for Medicare and Medicaid, changing student loan formulas, and other measures.

The reauthorization of the Temporary Assistance for Needy Families program was also contained in the bill, as was the provision for the Digital Transition and Public Safety Act of 2005. Part of the TANF reauthorization reduces the threshold for passport denial for child support arrearages under 42 USC 652(k) to $2,500.

Section 3005 of the Act also provided one and a half billion dollars for the Digital Transition and Public Safety Act of 2005 and defined in detail what comprised a coupon-eligible converter box for Digital Television broadcasts in the United States.

=== The impact on the elderly ===
The law extends Medicaid's "lookback" period for all asset transfers from three to five years and changes the start of the penalty period for transferred assets from the date of transfer to the date when the individual transferring the assets enters a nursing home and would otherwise be eligible for Medicaid coverage. In other words, the penalty period does not begin until the nursing home resident is out of funds, meaning she cannot afford to pay the nursing home. In states that have filial responsibility laws, nursing homes may seek reimbursement from the residents’ children. The Act also makes any individual with home equity above $500,000 ineligible for Medicaid nursing home care, although states may raise this threshold as high as $750,000. It also establishes new rules for the treatment of annuities, including a requirement that the state be named as the remainder beneficiary, allows Continuing Care Retirement Communities (CCRCs) to require residents to spend down their declared resources before applying for medical assistance, sets forth rules under which an individual's CCRC entrance fee is considered an available resource, requires all states to apply the so-called “income-first” rule to community spouses who appeal for an increased resource allowance based on their need for more funds invested to meet their minimum income requirements, extends long-term care partnership programs to any state, and authorizes states to include home and community-based services as an optional Medicaid benefit when they previously had to obtain a waiver to provide such services.

In addition, the legislation incorporates provisions in the original budget bill passed by the Senate closing certain asset transfer "loopholes," among them:

- The purchase of a life estate will be included in the definition of "assets" unless the purchaser resides in the home for at least one year after the date of purchase.
- Funds to purchase a promissory note, loan or mortgage will be included among assets unless the repayment terms are actuarially sound, provide for equal payments and prohibit the cancellation of the balance upon the death of the lender.
- States will be barred from "rounding down" fractional periods of ineligibility when determining ineligibility periods resulting from asset transfers.
- States will be permitted to treat multiple transfers of assets as a single transfer and begin any penalty period on the earliest date that would apply to such transfers.

While the federal law applies to all transfers made on or after the date of enactment (February 8, 2006), it also gives the states time to come into compliance. This gives many people in most states a little time to plan. The deadline for states to enact their own laws varies from state to state, but generally is the first day of the first calendar quarter beginning after the end of the next full legislative session.

== See also ==
- Conyers v. Bush
- Reconciliation process
- Enrolled bill rule
