= Program and System Information Protocol =

Video and audio industry protocol

Multiple MPEG programs are combined then sent to a transmitting antenna. An ATSC receiver then decodes the TS and displays it.

The Program and System Information Protocol (PSIP) is the MPEG (Moving Picture Experts Group, a video and audio industry group) and privately defined program-specific information originally defined by General Instrument for the DigiCipher 2 system and later extended for the ATSC digital television system for carrying metadata about each channel in the broadcast MPEG transport stream of a television station and for publishing information about television programs so that viewers can select what to watch by title and description. Its FM radio equivalent is Radio Data System (RDS).

== Function ==
PSIP defines virtual channels and content ratings, as well as electronic program guides with titles and (optionally) descriptions to be decoded and displayed by the ATSC tuner.

PSIP can also send:

- the exact time referenced to UTC and GPS time;
- the short name, which some stations use to publish their callsign. A maximum of seven characters can be used in a short name.

PSIP is defined in ATSC standard A/65, the most recent revision of which is A/65:2013, published in 2013. A/69 is a recommended practice for implementing PSIP in a television station.

PSIP also supersedes the A/55 and A/56 protocol methods of delivering program guide information (which the ATSC has deleted). TV Guide On Screen is a different, proprietary system provided by datacasting on a single station, while PSIP is required, at least in the United States, to be sent by every digital television station.

PSIP information may be passed through the airchain using proprietary protocols or through use of the Programming Metadata Communication Protocol metadata scheme.

=== Programming Metadata Communication Protocol ===
PMCP, defined in the Advanced Television Systems Committee's A/76B, provides ATSC broadcasters with a standardized means to exchange system information (SI) among systems that create and manage these data elements. These systems can be outside Program listing services, program management systems, traffic (commercial and program scheduling) and broadcast automation systems, which all contribute a portion of the PSIP data to a PSIP Generator.

At the heart of PMCP is an XML Schema (actually a collection of XML Schema Definition files), which provide a standardized structure into which PSI and PSIP-related data may be exchanged. PMCP does not dictate systems' internal database structures; it is simply a platform-independent protocol for the exchange of data.

PMCP was first published as A/76 in November 2004, and enjoys adoption from a variety of broadcast equipment and system vendors. Two revisions (largely backwards-compatible) with the standard have been made. ATSC A/76a extended PMCP to include metadata necessary for proper signaling of ACAP data broadcast elements, and A/76B, was released in 2007, fixed some errors and made the schema usable with the related SMPTE S2021 (BXF) schema.

== Included tables ==
System Time Table (STT) (Note: Indicates a Federal Communications Commission requirement)
Current time, transmitted at least once per second, with an accuracy of new time values within 1 second or better.
Master Guide Table (MGT)
Data pointers to other PSIP tables.
Terrestrial Virtual Channel Table (TVCT)
Defines each virtual channel and enables EITs to be associated with the channel.
Cable Virtual Channel Table (CVCT)
Assigns numbers to each virtual channel and enables EITs to be associated with the channel.
Rating Region Table (RRT)
Content ratings for each country (region) covered by the station, save the U.S., as that region is loaded into television sets already.
Event Information Table (EIT)
Titles and program guide data.
Extended Text Table (ETT)

Channel Extended Text Table (CETT)
Detailed descriptions of channels.
Event Extended Text Table (EETT)
Detailed descriptions of aired events.

Directed Channel Change Table (DCCT)
The DCC function lets broadcasters tell a digital television receiver where to change, based upon the viewer's settings. This is most likely to be a ZIP or other postal code, which can select demographically-based programming to show, such as television commercials or weather bulletins, possibly taken from an accompanying datacasting channel.
Implementation of the DCC feature is entirely optional, and depends on development of receiver and decoder technology. For example, a digital video recorder could record commercial broadcast at other times for later replay, so that many more different commercials could be shown in different parts of a large metro area than can actually be transmitted at once.
Directed Channel Change Selection Code Table (DCCSCT)
Provides for the ability to update states, counties and program genres used in DCCTs.

== See also ==
- Electronic program guide
