= List of assets owned by Hearst Communications =

This is a list of assets owned by Hearst Communications, a privately held American-based media conglomerate based in the Hearst Tower in New York City, New York.

== Publishing ==
=== Newspapers and Online Sites ===
- Austin American-Statesman (Austin, Texas)
- Beaumont Enterprise (Beaumont, Texas)
- Chron.com (Houston, Texas)
- The Dallas Morning News (Dallas, Texas)
- Edwardsville Intelligencer (Edwardsville, Illinois)
- Hearst Connecticut Media Group (HCMG)
  - Connecticut Post (Bridgeport, Connecticut)
  - Greenwich Time (Greenwich, Connecticut)
  - The Hour (Norwalk, Connecticut)
  - Journal Inquirer (Manchester, Connecticut)
  - The Middletown Press (Middletown, Connecticut)
  - The New Haven Register (New Haven, Connecticut)
  - The News-Times (Danbury, Connecticut)
  - RJ Media Group
    - The Cheshire Herald (Cheshire, Connecticut)
    - Record-Journal (Meriden, Connecticut)
  - The Register Citizen (Torrington, Connecticut)
  - Stamford Advocate (Stamford, Connecticut)
- Houston Chronicle (Houston, Texas)
- Huron Daily Tribune (Bad Axe, Michigan)
- Journal-Courier (Jacksonville, Illinois)
- King Features Syndicate
- Laredo Morning Times (Laredo, Texas)
- LocalEdge - formerly 'THE TALKING PHONE BOOK'
- Manistee News Advocate (Manistee, Michigan)
- Midland Daily News (Midland, Michigan)
- Midland Reporter-Telegram (Midland, Texas)
- MySA (San Antonio, Texas)
- The Pioneer (Big Rapids, Michigan)
- Plainview Daily Herald (Plainview, Texas)
- Puzzmo
- San Antonio Express-News (San Antonio, Texas)
- San Francisco Chronicle (San Francisco, California)
- SFGATE (San Francisco, California)
- The Telegraph (Alton, Illinois)
- Times Union (Albany, New York)
- seattlepi.com, formerly the Seattle Post-Intelligencer (Seattle, Washington)

=== Magazines ===
- Best Products
- Bicycling
- Car and Driver
- Cosmopolitan
- Country Living
- Delish
- Digital Spy
- Elle
- Elle Decor
- Esquire
- Food Network Magazine
- Good Housekeeping
- Harper's Bazaar
- HGTV Magazine
- House Beautiful
- iCrossing, Inc.
- Inside Soap
- Men's Health
- Motor Trend
- NetDoctor
- Oprah Daily
- The Pioneer Woman
- Popular Mechanics
- Prevention
- Redbook
- Road & Track
- Runner's World
- San Antonio Magazine
- Seventeen
- Town & Country
- Veranda
- Woman's Day
- Women's Health

== Broadcasting ==
=== Production & distribution ===
- Hearst Media Production Group
- NorthSouth Productions (50%)
- Hearst Entertainment

=== Radio ===
Media market	State	Station	Purchased	Notes
Baltimore	Maryland	WBAL	1935	(Note: Utilizes a translator, W268BA, at 101.5 FM.)
Baltimore	Maryland	WIYY	1960	

=== Television ===
Media market	State	Station	Purchased	Affiliation	Notes
Birmingham–Tuscaloosa–Anniston	Alabama	WVTM-TV	2014	NBC; CBS (13.4)	
Fort Smith–Fayetteville–Rogers	Arkansas	KHBS	1996	ABC; The CW (402)	
Fort Smith–Fayetteville–Rogers	Arkansas	KHOG-TV	1996	ABC; The CW (29.2)	
Sacramento–Stockton–Modesto	California	KCRA-TV	1999	NBC	
Sacramento–Stockton–Modesto	California	KQCA	2000	The CW (primary)/MyNetworkTV (secondary)	
Salinas–Monterey–Santa Cruz	California	KSBW	1998	NBC; ABC (8.2)	
Daytona Beach–Orlando–Clermont	Florida	WESH	1999	NBC	
Daytona Beach–Orlando–Clermont	Florida	WKCF	2006	The CW	
Fort Myers–Cape Coral–Naples	Florida	WBBH-TV	2023	NBC	
Fort Myers–Cape Coral–Naples	Florida	WZVN-TV	2023	ABC	(Note: Owned by Hoffman Communications, Inc.)
Lakeland–Tampa–St. Petersburg	Florida	WMOR-TV	1996	Independent	
Tequesta–West Palm Beach	Florida	WPBF	1997	ABC	
Savannah	Georgia	WJCL	2014	ABC	
Des Moines	Iowa	KCCI	1999	CBS	
Louisville	Kentucky	WLKY	1999	CBS	
New Orleans	Louisiana	WDSU	1999	NBC	
Poland Spring–Portland	Maine	WMTW	2004	ABC	
Poland Spring–Portland	Maine	WPXT	2018	The CW	
Baltimore	Maryland	WBAL-TV **	1948	NBC	
Boston	Massachusetts	WCVB-TV	1986	ABC	
Jackson	Mississippi	WAPT	1994	ABC; CBS (16.4)	
Kansas City	Missouri	KMBC-TV	1982	ABC	
Kansas City	Missouri	KCWE	2006	The CW	
Omaha	Nebraska	KETV	1999	ABC	
Manchester	New Hampshire	WMUR-TV	2001	ABC	
Albuquerque–Santa Fe	New Mexico	KOAT-TV	1999	ABC; CBS (7.4)	
Winston-Salem–Greensboro–High Point	North Carolina	WXII-TV	1999	NBC	
Winston-Salem–Greensboro–High Point	North Carolina	WCWG	2018	The CW	
Cincinnati	Ohio	WLWT	1997	NBC	
Oklahoma City	Oklahoma	KOCO-TV	1997	ABC	
Lancaster–Harrisburg–York–Lebanon	Pennsylvania	WGAL	1999	NBC	
Pittsburgh	Pennsylvania	WTAE-TV **	1958	ABC	
Greenville–Spartanburg–Anderson	South Carolina	WYFF	1999	NBC; CBS (4.3)	
Burlington–Montpelier	Vermont	WPTZ	1998	NBC	
Burlington–Montpelier	Vermont	WNNE	1998	The CW	
Milwaukee	Wisconsin	WISN-TV	1955	ABC	

=== Cable ===
- A+E Global Media
  - A&E
  - History
  - FYI
  - Viceland
  - Military History
  - Crime & Investigation Network
  - Lifetime
  - LMN
  - Lifetime Real Women
  - Defy (broadcast network; joint venture with Free TV Networks)
- Cosmopolitan Television
- ESPN, LLC (18%, with The Walt Disney Company and National Football League which hold 72% majority and 10% equity stake respectively)
  - ESPN
  - ESPN2
  - ESPN Classic
  - ESPNEWS
  - ESPN Deportes
  - ESPNU
  - ESPN Now
  - ESPN Plus
  - ESPN Films
  - ESPN PPV
  - ESPN Regional Television (dba ESPN Events)
  - ESPN International (see for complete list of channels)
    - North American Sports Network
    - TSN (30%)
  - ESPN Radio
  - Mobile ESPN
  - ESPN3
  - ESPN The Magazine
  - ESPN Home Entertainment (currently distributed by Genius Products)
  - ESPN Outdoors
    - BASS
  - ESPN Digital Center
  - Arena Football League (undisclosed minority stake acquired December 2006)

== Business media ==
- IC Master
- Electronic Engineers Master Catalog
- Electronic Products Magazine
- FleetCross
- Floor Covering Weekly
- IDG/Hearst
- Local.com
- Metrix4Media
- NOVA Electronik
- Stocknet
- StructuredContent
- TL Publications
- Used Car Guides

== Hearst Health ==
- First DataBank
- Homecare Homebase
- MCG
- MHK
- QGenda
- Zynx Health Incorporated

== Interactive media ==
Investments include:

- XM Satellite Radio
- MetaTV
- Circles
- Mobility Technologies
- Cymfony
- drugstore.com
- Referral Networks
- Hire.com
- govWorks.com
- Genealogy.com
- Scene7
- Tavolo
- Medscape
- iVillage, Inc.
- Brandwise
- Broadcast.com
- Exodus
- E Ink Corporation
- Zip2
- I Pro
- Netscape
- Digital Spy
- UGO Networks
- RealAge
- Delish.com
- Savored
- Manilla
- Hearst Shkulev Digital
- Puzzmo

== Transportation ==
- Black Book
- CAMP Systems International, Inc.
  - CAMP Europe S.A.S.
  - CAMP Data Support and Services (DSS), Ltd.
  - Inventory Locator Service, LLC
  - Continuum Applied Technology
  - Component Control
  - AMSTAT
- MOTOR Information Systems
- Noregon Systems

== Venture Investing Groups ==
- Hearst Ventures
- Hearst Lab
- Level Up Ventures

== Other ==
- CDS Global
- Fitch Group
- Hearst Holdings, Inc.
- Hearst Shkulev Media
- KUBRA Data Transfer Ltd. (80%)
- Reed Brennan
- Wyntoon

== Former assets ==
=== Dormant or shuttered ===
- Litton Entertainment (absorbed into Hearst Media Production Group)
  - Litton Worldwide Distribution
  - Litton Media Sales
  - Litton News Source
- Hearst Entertainment Productions (defunct)

==== ESPN (18% with The Walt Disney Company (72%) and the National Football League (10%)) ====
- ESPN Zone – Closed in 2018.
- Sony ESPN – Joint-venture with Sony Pictures Television Networks.
- ESPN3 – Closed on December 2, 2025.
- ESPN Classic – Closed in 2021.
- ESPN Plaza
- Longhorn Network – Closed on June 30, 2024, replaced with SEC Network.

=== Divested ===
- Light TV (joint venture with Mark Burnett, Roma Downey and MGM Television, sold to Allen Media Group and rebranded as TheGrio TV)
- New England Cable News (joint venture between Comcast and Hearst, sold its stake to Comcast)

==== ESPN (18% with The Walt Disney Company (72%) and the National Football League (10%)) ====
- Arena Football League – Closed and re-established.
- Bass Anglers Sportsman Society – Sold back to original owners in 2010.
- ESPN UK – Sold to BT Group in 2013, license was revoked in the 2020s following WarnerMedia's then stake acquisition.
- X Games – Sold to MSP Sports Capital in 2022.

=== Former media ===
- The American Weekly (1896-1966): Sunday newspaper supplement (November 1, 1896, until 1966)
- The Atlanta Georgian (1912-1939)
- Baltimore News-American and predecessors (1923-1986)
- Boston Herald and predecessors (1904-1982)
- Chicago American (1900-1956)
- The Connoisseur (1901-1992)
- Detroit Times (1921-1960)
- Dr. Oz The Good Life (2014–2021)
- Locomotion (1996-2005)
- Los Angeles Herald Examiner and predecessors (1903-1989)
- Marie Claire (1994-2021)
- Milwaukee Sentinel and predecessors (1919-1962)
- Nash's Magazine (1910-1937)
- New York Journal-American and predecessors (1896-1966)
- New York Daily Mirror (1924-1928, 1932–1963)
- Oakland Post Enquirer (1922-1960)
- Omaha Daily Bee (1928-1937)
- Pittsburgh Sun-Telegraph (1927-1960)
- Rochester Journal-American (1922-1937)
- San Francisco Examiner (1880-2000)
- Science Digest (1937-1988)
- Sports Afield (1953-2000)
- Syracuse Herald-Journal and predecessors (1922-1939)
- The Washington Times and The Washington Herald (1917-1939)

== See also ==
- Lists of corporate assets

== Sources ==
- Columbia Journalism Review
