= Hearst Communications =

American multinational mass media conglomerate group

Hearst Communications, Inc.
- Logo used since 2023

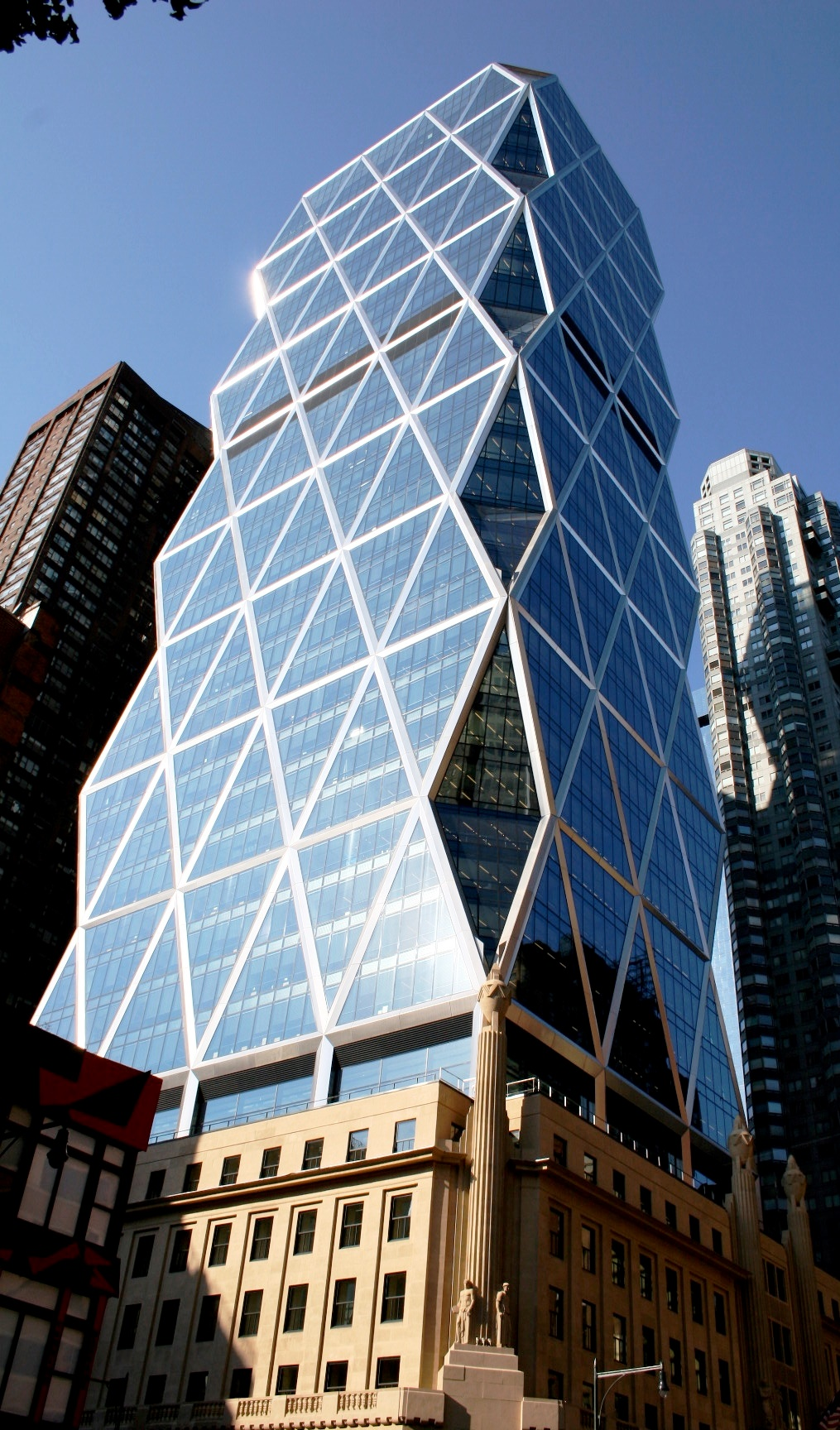
- Hearst Tower in Midtown Manhattan, September 2006
- Type: Private
- Industry: Media
- Founded: March 4, 1887; 139 years ago San Francisco, California, U.S.
- Founder: William Randolph Hearst
- Headquarters: Hearst Tower, New York, New York, United States
- Area served: Worldwide
- Key people: William Randolph Hearst III; (chairman); Frank A. Bennack Jr.; (executive vice chairman); Steve Swartz; (president and CEO)
- Products: Books; Magazines; Newspapers; Publications; Television
- Revenue: ▲US$13.5 billion (2025)
- Owner: Hearst family
- Number of employees: 22,000 (2024)
- Divisions: Hearst Television; Hearst Magazines; Hearst Ventures; Hearst Health; Hearst Transportation; Hearst Real Estate; Hearst Entertainment & Syndication; Hearst Newspapers; Fitch Group
- Subsidiaries: A+E Global Media; ESPN, LLC (18%); Fitch Ratings; First Databank; King Features Syndicate; NorthSouth Productions (50%)
- Website: hearst.com

Hearst Communications, Inc. is an American multinational mass media and business information conglomerate owned by the Hearst family and based in Hearst Tower in Midtown Manhattan in New York City.

Hearst owns newspapers, magazines, television channels, and television stations, including the Albany Times-Union, Houston Chronicle, Austin American-Statesman, San Francisco Chronicle, Cosmopolitan and Esquire. It owns A+E Global Media cable network group and 18 percent of the sports television company ESPN Inc. The conglomerate also owns Fitch Group and First Databank.

The company was founded by William Randolph Hearst, a newspaper owner who was most well known for his use of yellow journalism. The Hearst family remains involved in its ownership and management.

== History ==
=== Formative years ===
In 1880, George Hearst, mining entrepreneur and U.S. senator, bought the San Francisco Daily Examiner. In 1887, he turned the Examiner over to his son, William Randolph Hearst, who that year founded the Hearst Corporation.

=== Peak era ===
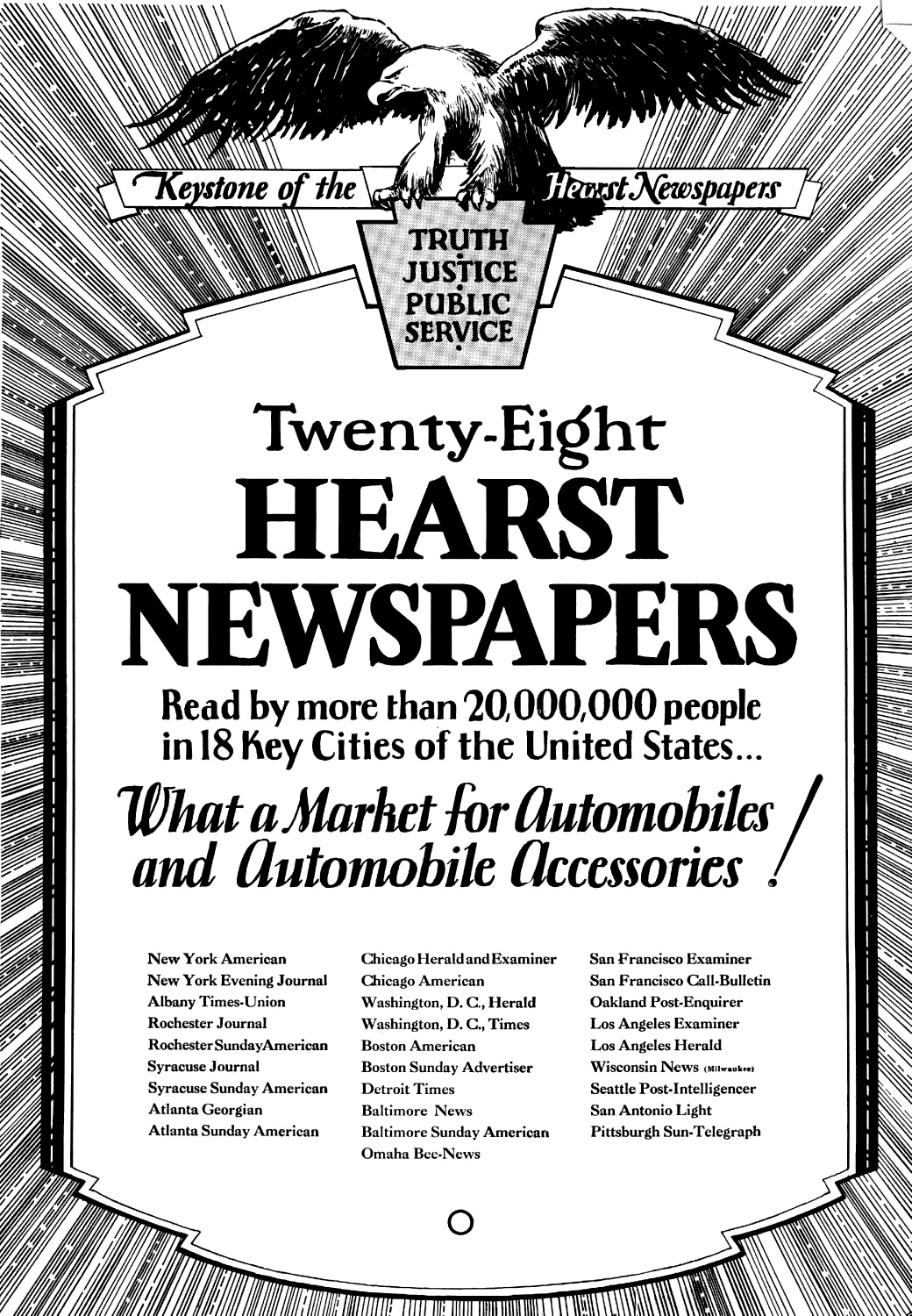
An ad asking automakers to place ads in Hearst chain, noting their circulation

In the 1920s and 1930s, Hearst owned the biggest media conglomerate in the world, which included a number of magazines and newspapers in major cities. Hearst also began acquiring radio stations to complement his papers. Hearst saw financial challenges in the early 1920s, when he was using company funds to build Hearst Castle in San Simeon and support movie production at Cosmopolitan Productions. This eventually led to the merger of the magazine Hearst International with Cosmopolitan in 1925.

Despite some financial troubles, Hearst began extending his reach in 1921, purchasing the Detroit Times, The Boston Record, and the Seattle Post-Intelligencer. Hearst then added the Los Angeles Herald and Washington Herald, as well as the Oakland Post-Enquirer, the Syracuse Telegram and the Rochester Journal-American in 1922. He continued his buying spree into the mid-1920s, purchasing the Baltimore News (1923), the San Antonio Light (1924), the Albany Times Union (1924), and The Milwaukee Sentinel (1924). In 1924, Hearst entered the tabloid market in New York City with New York Daily Mirror, meant to compete with the New York Daily News.

In addition to print and radio, Hearst established Cosmopolitan Pictures in the early 1920s, distributing his films under the newly created Metro-Goldwyn-Mayer. In 1929, Hearst and MGM created the Hearst Metrotone newsreels.

=== Retrenching after the Great Depression ===
The Great Depression hurt Hearst and his publications. Cosmopolitan Book was sold to Farrar & Rinehart in 1931. After two years of leasing them to Eleanor "Cissy" Patterson (of the McCormick-Patterson family that owned the Chicago Tribune), Hearst sold her The Washington Times and Herald in 1939; she merged them to form the Washington Times-Herald. That year he also bought the Milwaukee Sentinel from Paul Block (who bought it from the Pfisters in 1929), absorbing his afternoon Wisconsin News into the morning publication. Also in 1939, he sold the Atlanta Georgian to Cox Newspapers, which merged it with the Atlanta Journal.

Following Adolf Hitler's rise to power in Germany, William Randolph Hearst personally instructed his reporters in Germany to only give positive coverage to Hitler and the Nazis, and fired journalists who refused to write stories favourable of German fascism. During this time, high ranking Nazis were given space to write articles in Hearst press newspapers, including Hermann Göring and Alfred Rosenberg.

Hearst, with his chain now owned by his creditors after a 1937 liquidation, also had to merge some of his morning papers into his afternoon papers. In Chicago, he combined the morning Herald-Examiner and the afternoon American into the Herald-American in 1939. This followed the 1937 combination of the New York Evening Journal and the morning American into the New York Journal-American, the sale of the Omaha Daily Bee to the World-Herald.

Afternoon papers were a profitable business in pre-television days, often outselling their morning counterparts featuring stock market information in early editions, while later editions were heavy on sporting news with results of baseball games and horse races. Afternoon papers also benefited from continuous reports from the battlefront during World War II. After the war, however, both television news and suburbs experienced explosive growth; thus, evening papers were more affected than those published in the morning, whose circulation remained stable while their afternoon counterparts' sales plummeted.

In 1947, Hearst produced an early television newscast for the DuMont Television Network: I.N.S. Telenews, and in 1948 he became the owner of WBAL-TV in Baltimore.

The earnings of Hearst's three morning papers, the San Francisco Examiner, the Los Angeles Examiner, and The Milwaukee Sentinel, supported the company's money-losing afternoon publications such as the Los Angeles Herald-Express, the New York Journal-American, and the Chicago American. The company sold the latter paper in 1956 to the Chicago Tribune's owners, who changed it to the tabloid-size Chicago Today in 1969 and ceased publication in 1974. In 1960, Hearst also sold the Pittsburgh Sun-Telegraph to the Pittsburgh Post-Gazette and the Detroit Times to The Detroit News. After a lengthy strike it sold the Milwaukee Sentinel to the afternoon Milwaukee Journal in 1962. The same year Hearst's Los Angeles papers – the morning Examiner and the afternoon Herald-Express – merged to become the evening Los Angeles Herald-Examiner. The 1962–63 New York City newspaper strike left the city with no papers for over three months, with the Journal-American one of the earliest strike targets of the Typographical Union. The Boston Record and the Evening American merged in 1961 as the Record-American and in 1964, the Baltimore News-Post became the Baltimore News-American.

In 1953, Hearst Magazines bought Sports Afield magazine, which it published until 1999 when it sold the journal to Robert E. Petersen. In 1958, Hearst's International News Service merged with E.W. Scripps' United Press, forming United Press International as a response to the growth of the Associated Press and Reuters. The following year Scripps-Howard's San Francisco News merged with Hearst's afternoon San Francisco Call-Bulletin. Also in 1959, Hearst acquired the paperback book publisher Avon Books.

In 1965, the Hearst Corporation began pursuing joint operating agreements (JOAs). It reached the first agreement with the DeYoung family, proprietors of the afternoon San Francisco Chronicle, which began to produce a joint Sunday edition with the Examiner. In turn, the Examiner became an evening publication, absorbing the News-Call-Bulletin. The following year, the Journal-American reached another JOA with another two landmark New York City papers: the New York Herald Tribune and Scripps-Howard's World-Telegram and Sun to form the New York World Journal Tribune (recalling the names of the city's mid-market dailies), which collapsed after only a few months.

The 1962 merger of the Herald-Express and Examiner in Los Angeles led to the termination of many journalists who began to stage a 10-year strike in 1967. The effects of the strike accelerated the pace of the company's demise, with the Herald Examiner ceasing publication November 2, 1989.

=== Newspaper shifts ===
Hearst moved into hardcover publishing by acquiring Arbor House in 1978 and William Morrow and Company in 1981. In 1982, the company sold the Boston Herald American — the result of the 1972 merger of Hearst's Record-American & Advertiser with the Herald-Traveler — to Rupert Murdoch's News Corporation, which renamed the paper as The Boston Herald, competing to this day with The Boston Globe.

In 1986, Hearst bought the Houston Chronicle and that same year closed the 213-year-old Baltimore News-American after a failed attempt to reach a JOA with A.S. Abell Company, the family who published The Baltimore Sun since its founding in 1837. Abell sold the paper several days later to the Times-Mirror syndicate of the Chandlers' Los Angeles Times, also competitor to the Los Angeles Herald-Examiner, which folded in 1989. In 1990, both King Features Entertainment and King Phoenix Entertainment were rebranded under the collective Hearst Entertainment umbrella. King Features Entertainment was renamed to Hearst Entertainment Distribution, while King Phoenix Entertainment was renamed to Hearst Entertainment Productions.

On November 8, 1990, Hearst Corporation acquired 20% stake of ESPN, Inc. from RJR Nabisco (now a subsidiary of Mondelez International) for a price estimated between $165 million and $175 million. The other 80% has been owned by The Walt Disney Company since 1996, ironically since some Hearst-Argyle Television Stations are ABC (also owned by The Walt Disney Company since 1996) affiliates that also show ESPN games, it has been an all-around good equal partnership business for both companies. Over the last 25 years, the ESPN investment is said to have accounted for at least 50% of total Hearst Corp profits and is worth at least $13 billion. In 1993, Hearst closed the San Antonio Light after it purchased the rival San Antonio Express-News from Murdoch. In April 1995, Netscape Communications Corporation announced Hearst was part of a group of private investors who purchased stake in the company.

On July 30, 1996, Hearst and the Cisneros Group of Companies of Venezuela announced its plans to launch Locomotion, a Latin American animation cable television channel, it eventually launched on November 4.

On March 26, 1997, Hearst Broadcasting announced that it would merge with Argyle Television Holdings II for $525 million, the merger was completed in August to form Hearst-Argyle Television (later renamed as Hearst Television in 2009). In 1999, Hearst sold its Avon and Morrow book publishing activities to HarperCollins, while Hearst-Argyle Television bought the broadcasting division of Pulitzer, Inc. for $700 million.

=== 21st century ===
In 2000, the Hearst Corp. sold its flagship and "Monarch of the Dailies", the afternoon San Francisco Examiner, and acquiring the long-time competing, but now larger morning paper, San Francisco Chronicle from the Charles de Young family. The San Francisco Examiner is now published as a daily freesheet. In December 2003, Marvel Entertainment acquired Cover Concepts from Hearst, to extend Marvel's demographic reach among public school children.

In 2006, Hearst acquired an interest in Fitch Group, a global financial services company. Hearst increased its ownership of Fitch Group to 80% in 2015, and to 100% in 2018.

In 2009, A&E Networks acquired Lifetime Entertainment Services, with Hearst ownership increasing to 42%.

In 2010, Hearst acquired digital marketing agency iCrossing.

In 2011, Hearst absorbed more than 100 magazine titles from the Lagardère Group for more than $700 million and became a challenger of Time Inc ahead of Condé Nast. In December 2012, Hearst Corporation partnered again with NBCUniversal to launch Esquire Network.

On February 20, 2014, Hearst Magazines International appointed Gary Ellis to the new position, Chief Digital Officer. That December, DreamWorks Animation sold a 25% stake in AwesomenessTV for $81.25 million to Hearst.

In January 2017, Hearst announced that it had acquired a majority stake in Litton Entertainment; Litton entertainment was rebranded as Hearst Media Production Group in 2022. Its CEO, Dave Morgan, was a former employee of Hearst.

On January 23, 2017, Hearst announced that it had acquired the business operations of The Pioneer Group from fourth-generation family owners Jack and John Batdorff. The Pioneer Group was a Michigan-based communications network that circulates print and digital news to local communities across the state. In addition to daily newspapers, The Pioneer and Manistee News Advocate, Pioneer published three weekly papers and four local shopper publications, and operated a digital marketing services business. The acquisition brought Hearst Newspapers to publishing 19 daily and 61 weekly papers.

Other 2017 acquisitions include the New Haven Register and associated papers from Digital First Media, and the Alton, Illinois, Telegraph and Jacksonville, Illinois, Journal-Courier from Civitas Media.

In October 2017, Hearst announced it would acquire the magazine and book businesses of Rodale in Emmaus, Pennsylvania with some sources reporting the purchase price as about $225 million. The transaction was expected to close in January following government approvals.

In 2018, Hearst acquired the global health and wellness magazine brands owned by Rodale, Inc.

In June 2020, Hearst Autos announced the acquisition of Bring a Trailer, a digital auction platform and auto enthusiast community.

In April 2023, Hearst bought WBBH-TV, an NBC-affiliated television station in Fort Myers, Florida, from Waterman Broadcasting Corporation. In June 2023, Hearst acquired the Journal Inquirer and later in October 2023 bought San Antonio Magazine. The company paid $150,000 in cash plus an amount equal to 90% of the magazine's accounts receivable

In November 2023, Hearst acquired all print and digital operations owned by RJ Media Group, including the Record-Journal, seven weekly newspapers and a digital advertising agency. In December 2023, Hearst bought Puzzmo, a puzzle games website.

In April 2024, Hearst acquired the Texas magazines Austin Monthly and Austin Home from Open Sky Media. A new organization called Hearst Texas Austin Media was created to manage the titles along with the Austin Daily newsletter which was created early that year.

In August 2024, Hearst announced it would acquire QGenda, a provider of healthcare workforce management software solutions, from investment firms Francisco Partners and ICONIQ Growth. QGenda became the sixth business in the Hearst Health division following the acquisition of MCG (formerly Milliman Care Guidelines) in 2012, majority stakes in Homecare Homebase in 2013 and MHK (formerly MedHOK) in 2016.

Hearst entered into a content partnership with OpenAI in October 2024, under which content from more than 40 of its newspapers and more than 20 of its magazine brands would be incorporated into OpenAI's products, including ChatGPT. Content used in ChatGPT would feature citations and direct links to the original Hearst publications.

Hearst Magazines acquired MotorTrend Group from Warner Bros. Discovery in December 2024. The purchase included the MotorTrend, Hot Rod, Roadkill, and Automobile brands, as well as automotive-focused consumer magazines, streaming video channels and live events.

In February 2025, Hearst acquired the Austin American-Statesman from Gannett, expanding its newspaper holdings in Texas.

Hearst completed its acquisition of DallasNews Corporation, the parent company of The Dallas Morning News and marketing agency Medium Giant, on September 24, 2025.

By 2025, Hearst's business-to-business (B2B) operations accounted for approximately 60% of the company's total profits, compared with less than 10% 15 years earlier. These operations include financial information services, healthcare services, and transportation data and software businesses.

== Chief executive officers ==
- In 1880, George Hearst entered the newspaper business, acquiring the San Francisco Daily Examiner.
- On March 4, 1887, he turned the Examiner over to his son, 23-year-old William Randolph Hearst, who was named editor and publisher. William Hearst died in 1951, at age 88.
- In 1951, Richard E. Berlin, who had been president of the company since 1943, succeeded William Hearst as chief executive officer. Berlin retired in 1973. William Randolph Hearst Jr. claimed in 1991 that Berlin had suffered from Alzheimer's disease starting in the mid-1960s and that caused him to shut down several Hearst newspapers without just cause.
- From 1973 to 1975, Frank Massi, a longtime Hearst financial officer, was president, during which time he carried out a financial reorganization followed by an expansion program in the late 1970s.
- From 1975 to 1979, John R. Miller was Hearst president and chief executive officer.
- Frank Bennack was CEO and president from 1979 to 2002, when he became vice chairman, returning as CEO from 2008 to 2013, and remains executive vice chairman.
- Victor F. Ganzi was president and CEO from 2002 to 2008.
- Steven Swartz has been president since 2012, and CEO since 2013.

== Trustees of William Randolph Hearst's will ==
Under William Randolph Hearst's will, a common board of thirteen trustees (its composition fixed at five family members and eight outsiders) administers the Hearst Foundation, the William Randolph Hearst Foundation, and the trust that owns (and selects the 26-member board of) the Hearst Corporation (parent of Hearst Communications which shares the same officers). The foundations shared ownership with the Hearst Corporation until tax law changed to prevent this and are now independent private philanthropies.

In 2009, the Hearst Corporation was estimated to be the largest private company managed by trustees in this way. As of 2017, the trustees are:

=== Family members ===
- Anissa Boudjakdji Balson, granddaughter of fifth son, David Whitmire Hearst Sr.
- Lisa Hearst Hagerman, granddaughter of third son, John Randolph Hearst Sr.
- George Randolph Hearst III, grandson of Hearst's eldest son, George Randolph Hearst Sr., and publisher of the Albany Times Union
- William Randolph Hearst III, son of second son, William Randolph Hearst Jr., and chairman of the board of the corporation
- Virginia Hearst Randt, daughter of late former chairman and fourth son, Randolph Apperson Hearst

=== Non-family members ===
- James M. Asher, chief legal and development officer of the corporation
- David J. Barrett, former chief executive officer of Hearst Television, Inc.
- Frank A. Bennack Jr., former chief executive officer and executive vice chairman of the corporation
- John G. Conomikes, former executive of the corporation, preceded Barrett at Hearst-Argyle Television
- Gilbert C. Maurer, former chief operating officer of the corporation and former president of Hearst Magazines died April 6th 2025
- Mark F. Miller, former executive vice president of Hearst Magazines
- Mitchell Scherzer, executive vice president and chief financial officer of the corporation
- Steven R. Swartz, president and chief executive officer of the corporation
- Paul G. Taylor, senior vice president of the corporation and president and chief executive officer of Fitch Group.

The trust dissolves when all family members alive at the time of Hearst's death in August 1951 have died.

== See also ==
- 224 West 57th Street, building formerly occupied by Hearst Magazines
- List of assets owned by Hearst Communications
- Newsboys' strike of 1899
