= Lust 'n Rust =

- The Trailer Park Musical
- Productions: 2001 Theater Building in Chicago; 2007 Patuxtent Playhouse; 2007 Mercer Community College; 2008 Valley Repertory Company

Lust 'n Rust: the trailer park musical is a play written by Frank Haney, Carol Kimball and Dave Stratton.

== Synopsis ==
Lust 'n Rust relates the story of Steve, a New Jersey-native corporate manager who is transferred to a small Southern Illinois town to run the local Agribig food processing plant. He moves into the Redbud mobile estates and meets the quirky characters that live in the park. Meeting Connie, a neighbor in the park that waits tables at Smitty's Diner, quickly complicates Steve's life. Connie is splitting up with her soon-to-be ex-husband Duane, who is trying to gain Connie's forgiveness for an unfortunate incident. Steve's life is made more difficult when his boss at Agribig hands him his most difficult assignment yet, one that could have a disastrous effect on the local economy.

== Productions ==
Lust 'n Rust has been performed by the following companies:

- Theatre Building in Chicago
- Patuxtent Playhouse
- Mercer Community College
- Valley Repertory Company

== Musical numbers ==
- Mobilized - Steve Morgan
- Look Away - Steve Morgan and Connie Nichols
- Redbud Mobile Estates - Red, Tanya, Junior, Buzz, Connie, Duane, Latisha, Janette
- Double Wide - Red and Latisha
- What We're Doin - Tanya and Buzz
- Let Her Go - Duane Kroesser
- Bigger Than Yours - Connie Nichols
- Once Upon A Time - Steve Morgan
- They Say - Connie Nichols
- Cajun Cooking - Latisha and Buzz
- Off To Mexico - Steve Morgan and Duane Kroesser
- Over and Done - Steve Morgan and Connie Nichols
- Mobilized (reprise) - All

== Critical reviews ==
The Calvert county press declared the Patuxtent Playhouse production a hit and an entertaining evening out. The Journal Inquirer had high praise for the Valley Repertory production, stating, "For an excellent night of entertainment with a remarkable collection of talent under one roof, see the Valley Repertory Company's production of 'Lust 'n Rust — The Trailer Park Musical.'"

== Cast ==
Chicago premiere production

Character	Played by
RED	Whit Spurgeon
STEVE MORGAN	David P. Bryson
JUNIOR, HENDERSON	Thomas Colby
CONNIE KROESSER	Laura Scott Wade
DUANE KROESSER	Marc Jablon
JANETTE	Francesca Peppiatt
LATISHA WASHINGTON	Jasmyne Brown
BUZZ	Fred Warner
TANYA	Heather Donaldson-Moran

Patuxtent Playhouse

Character	Played by
RED	Monty Hill
STEVE MORGAN	Greg Rumpf
JUNIOR	Mike Harrenton
CONNIE KROESSER	Geri Reynolds
DUANE KROESSER	Josh Smalls
JANETTE	Elizabeth Lang
LATISHA WASHINGTON	Dionne Gause
BUZZ	Jack Reynolds
TANYA	Lisa Sciannella

Mercer Community College

Character	Played by
RED	Tom Bessellieu
STEVE MORGAN	John Kollmer
JUNIOR	Paul Saunders
CONNIE KROESSER	Joanna Woodruff
DUANE KROESSER	Jack Bathke
JANETTE	Laurie Hardy
LATISHA WASHINGTON	Tamesha Hawkins
BUZZ	John Ragazzo
TANYA	Ileana Hernandez

Valley Repertory Company

Character	Played by
RED	Gary Turrel
STEVE MORGAN	Gaetan Michaud
JUNIOR	Brent Alexander
CONNIE KROESSER	Janine Flood
DUANE KROESSER	Chris Kibbe
JANETTE	Melissa Styche
LATISHA WASHINGTON	Rhonda Oliver
BUZZ	Brendan Albetski
TANYA	Cassie Wood
HENDERSON	Lisa Eaton
