= Genesee River =

River in New York and Pennsylvania

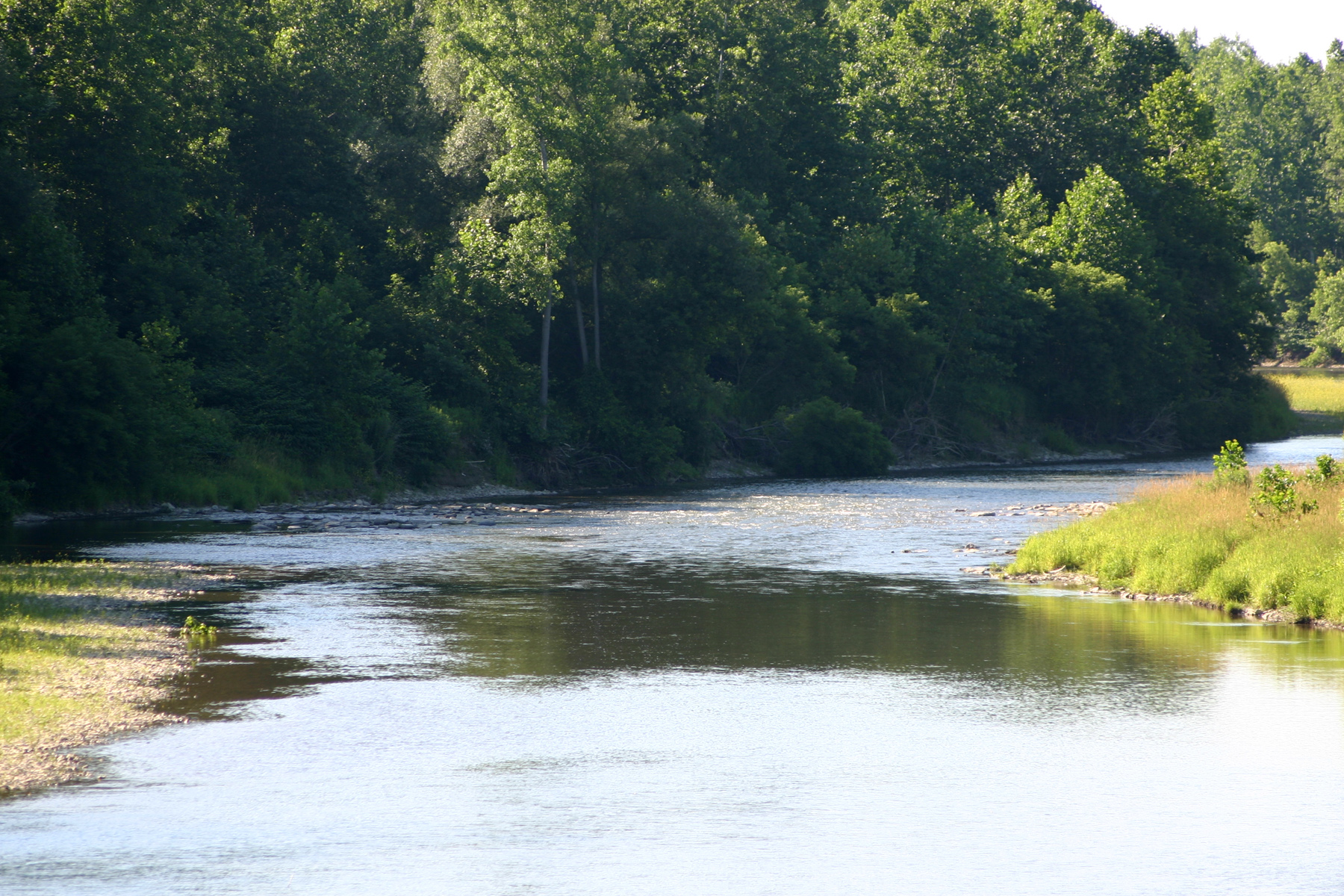
- Genesee River near Belmont

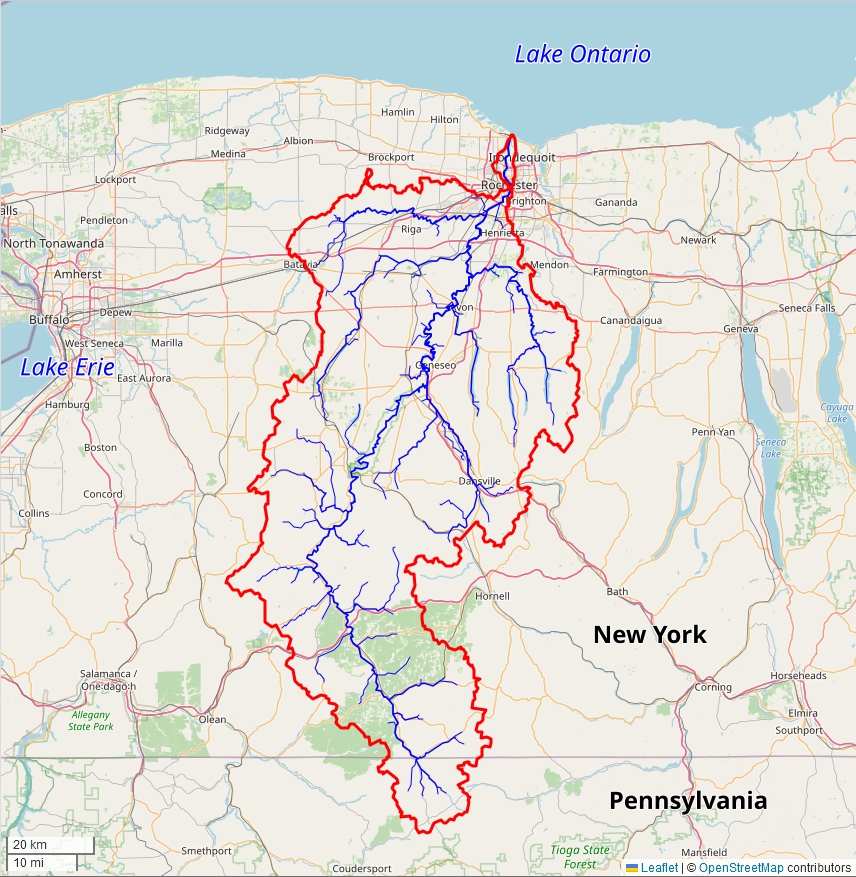
- Genesee River watershed (Interactive map)
- Native name: Čunehstí•yu• (Tuscarora)

Location
- Country: United States
- State: New York, Pennsylvania
- Counties: (see Navbox, below)
- City: Rochester, NY

Physical characteristics
- Source
  - location: Ulysses Township, Potter County, Pennsylvania
  - coordinates: 41°53′33″N 77°43′54″W
  - elevation: 2,275 ft (693 m)
- Mouth: Lake Ontario
  - location: Charlotte, Rochester, Monroe County, New York
  - coordinates: 43°15′30″N 77°36′08″W
  - elevation: 243 ft (74 m)
- Length: 157 mi (253 km)
- Basin size: 2,500 sq mi (6,500 km^{2})
- Discharge
  - location: Lake Ontario
- Discharge
  - location: Portageville, NY

The Genesee River (/ˌdʒɛnɪˈsiː/ JEH-nih-SEE) is a tributary of Lake Ontario flowing northward through the Twin Tiers of Pennsylvania and New York in the United States. The river contains several waterfalls in New York at Letchworth State Park and Rochester.

The river was historically used as a border between the lands of the Seneca to the east and the Erie and Wenro to the west. Later, the river provided the original power for the Rochester area's 19th century mills, and still provides hydroelectric power for downtown Rochester. Flooding occurred periodically in the river valley before construction of the Mount Morris Dam in the 1950s.

== Geology ==
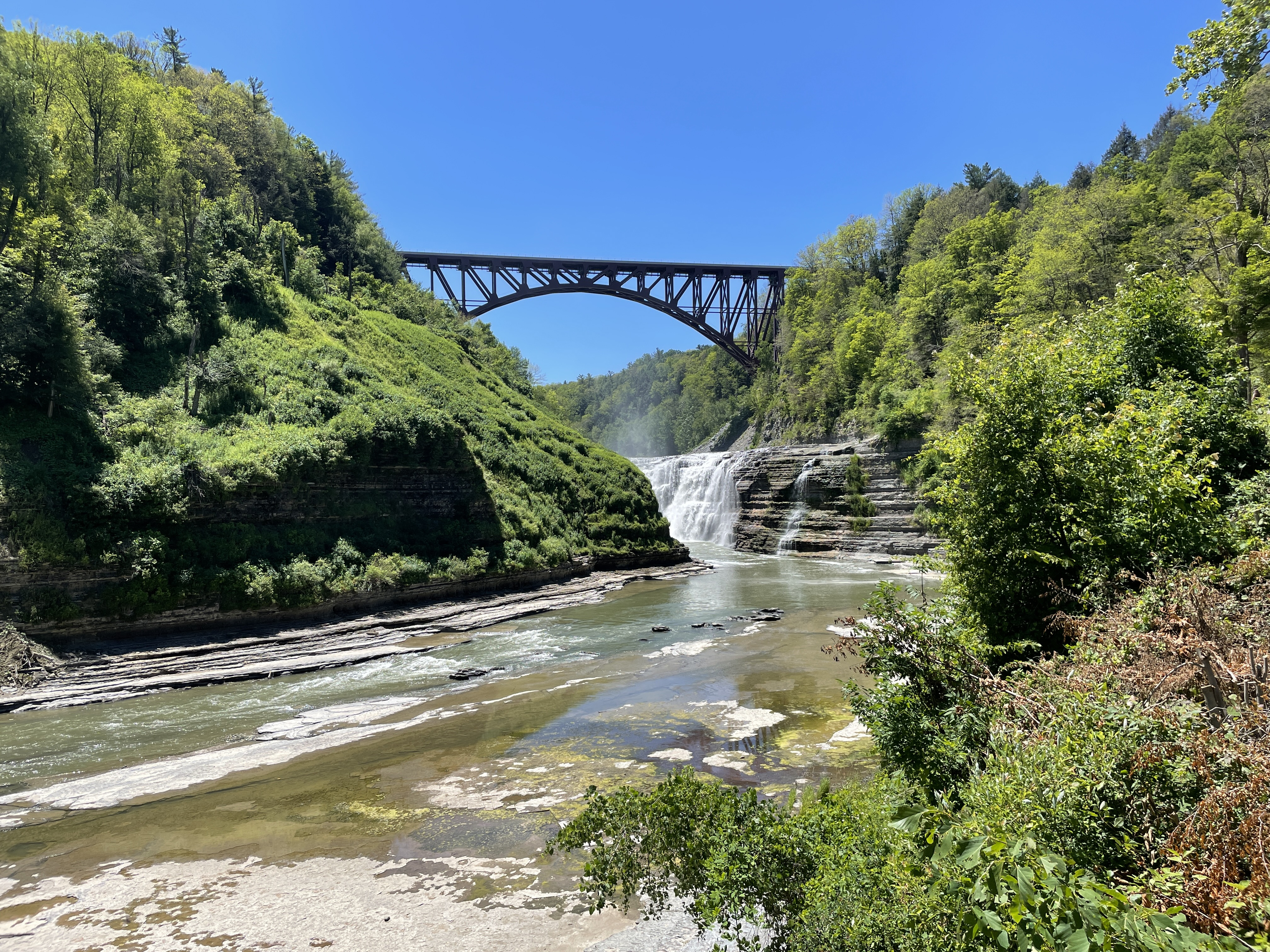
Portage Viaduct and Upper Falls in Letchworth State Park

The Genesee is the remaining western branch of a preglacial system, with rock layers tilted an average of 40 feet per mile (8 meters per kilometer), so the river flows across progressively older bedrock as it flows northward. It begins in exposing the Allegheny Plateau's characteristic conglomerates: sandstones and shales in the rock columns of the Mississippian and Pennsylvanian subperiods. Thereafter, farther downstream as it traverses the area known as The Grand Canyon of the East, where it falls (three times) over 600 feet (180 m) total. As it passes through the gorges in New York's Letchworth State Park, the river also often exposes older rocks such as shales (some rich in hydrocarbons), siltstones and some limestones of the Devonian period at Letchworth and, at other canyons with three more waterfalls at Rochester cuts through the Niagara Escarpment, exposing limestones and shales of Silurian age in the rock column. With cuttings in the geologic record showing so many early ages, the river area has a great variety of fossils for paleobiological and stratigraphic analysis.

During the past million years, four glacial ages covered the Rochester area. The southern edges of the Laurentide Ice Sheet and those advances impacted the formation geology and geography of the area. The most recent glacier that left evidence here was about 10,000 years ago and it caused compression of the earth by as much as 2,500 feet (760 m). About 12,000 years ago, the area underwent massive changes, which included the rerouting of the Genesee and other water bodies. The pre-ice age eastern branch of the Genesee runs south of Mount Morris and was completely diverted by extensive terminal moraines in Livingston County with a key blocking dam just south of Dansville, so most of the upper section of the ancient river was diverted instead to fall the off Appalachian Plateau toward the Susquehanna River system (to an eventual destination well to the southeast).

Only a small creek (Irondequoit Creek) flows in what is left of this large paleogeologic valley. The area of the lower river was also affected. Since the earth rebounded from the melting glaciers more rapidly in Canada than in New York, water from Lake Ontario was spilled over New York due to its lower elevation. During this time, the original outlet of the Genesee River, Irondequoit Bay, was flooded out, creating the current bay. As these waters later retreated, glacial debris caused the river to be rerouted to the west along its current path.

== History ==
The Seneca nation traditionally lived between the Genesee River and Canandaigua Lake. The region was surveyed by Thomas Davies in 1766. The High Falls was then also known as the Great Seneca Falls, and the Genesee River was also spelled Zinochsaa by early writers.

Historically, the river's gorge formed a clearly demarcated border between the lands of the Haudenosaunee, whose range extended east and the related tribes of the Erie people and Wenrohronon along the west side of the gorge. By the end of the Beaver Wars and the American Revolution, the lands in all of upstate New York into the Ohio Country were controlled by the Haudenosaunee Confederation, but were also effectively depopulated, the tribes weakened in the Revolution. In 1779, on the orders of George Washington, the Sullivan Expedition destroyed over 40 Haudenosaunee villages in and around the watershed to force the Seneca and allied nations out of the newly formed United States. Subsequently, with most Haudenosaunee having fled to Canada, the remnant tribal groups were in no position to further impede white settlers, so most of New York state west of the Genesee River became part of the Holland Purchase after the American Revolution. From 1801 to 1846 the entire region was sold to individual owners from the Holland Land office in Batavia, New York. In the 1797 Treaty of Big Tree, the Seneca tribes were granted six reservations along the river, among them Canawaugus, Little Beard's Town, Geneseo, Caneadea, Deyuitgau and Gardeau. In August 1826, the Ogden Land Company purchased the six Genesee River reservations from the Seneca, allegedly under duress; the modern Seneca Nation of Indians does not recognize the 1826 sale as valid and moved to reclaim Canawaugus in December 2022.

On Friday, November 13, 1829 (Friday the 13th), the daredevil Sam Patch jumped to his death before 8,000 spectators at the Upper Falls in Rochester.

If "not for hydropower, the flour mills, clothing mills, and tool fabricators would not have located in Rochester", and the 1825 Erie Canal allowed the mills to ship products to New York City. A few hundred feet north of the center of the village of Rochester, the Erie Canal crossed the Genesee River via an 1823 stone aqueduct, which was 802 feet (244 m) long and 17 feet (5.2 m) wide, and was replaced by the Second Genesee Aqueduct in 1842.

In 1836 the Genesee Valley Canal was begun to build a new canal from the Erie Canal near Rochester, up the Genesee Valley, across to the Allegheny River at Olean. Construction of new sections extended upriver (southward) until 1880. Although an important commercial route, the canal was plagued by frequent flood damage and the final leg down the Allegany River was never completed. The most difficult section to build was the bypass around the gorge and falls at present day Letchworth Park. The canal followed the old Native American portage route, which necessitated many locks. These old locks can still be seen near Nunda. The project was abandoned, and the right of way was sold in 1880. The property became the roadbed for the Genesee Valley Canal Railroad, which eventually merged with the Pennsylvania Railroad. Much of the canal and railroad right-of-way is open to the public today as the Genesee Valley Greenway, which was started in 1991.

In 1852 a wooden railroad bridge was built over the Upper Falls at Portageville. It was the largest of all wooden bridges built at the time. The wood from 300 acres (1.2 km²) of trees was required for its timber. In the "summer of 1943", Arch Merrill walked the length of the Genesee River.

Serial killer Arthur Shawcross dumped most of his victims in or near the river, leading to him being nicknamed "The Genesee River Killer".

=== Floods ===
A March 1865 thaw was the worst Genesee flood in Rochester history, and a similar 1913 flood motivated the excavation of the Genesee's rock bed in Downtown Rochester. The 1972 Hurricane Agnes flood broke all county historical records, with the most concentrated damage in the Wellsville area. The water from Hurricane Agnes caused the only instance where the river's flow exceeded the storage capacity of the reservoir of the Mount Morris Dam, the largest flood control dam east of the Mississippi, and water had to be released from the dam to prevent overtopping of the spillway.

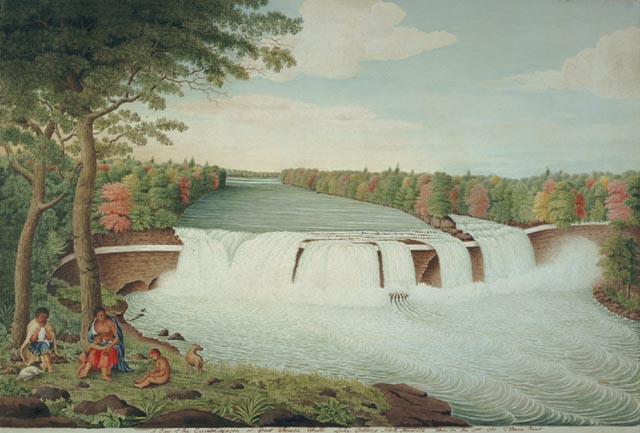
A View of the Casconchiagon or Great Seneca Falls, Lake Ontario, taken 1766 by Thomas Davies

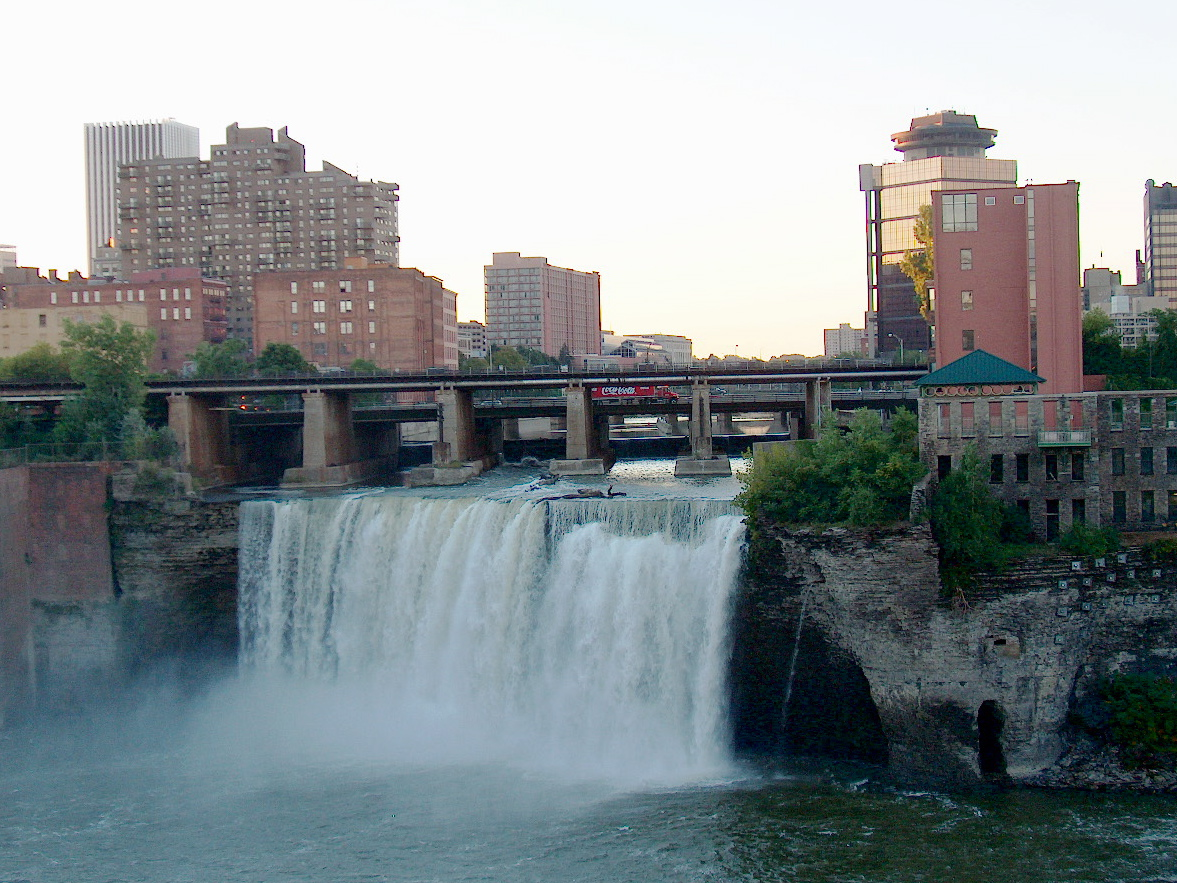
The High Falls in downtown Rochester

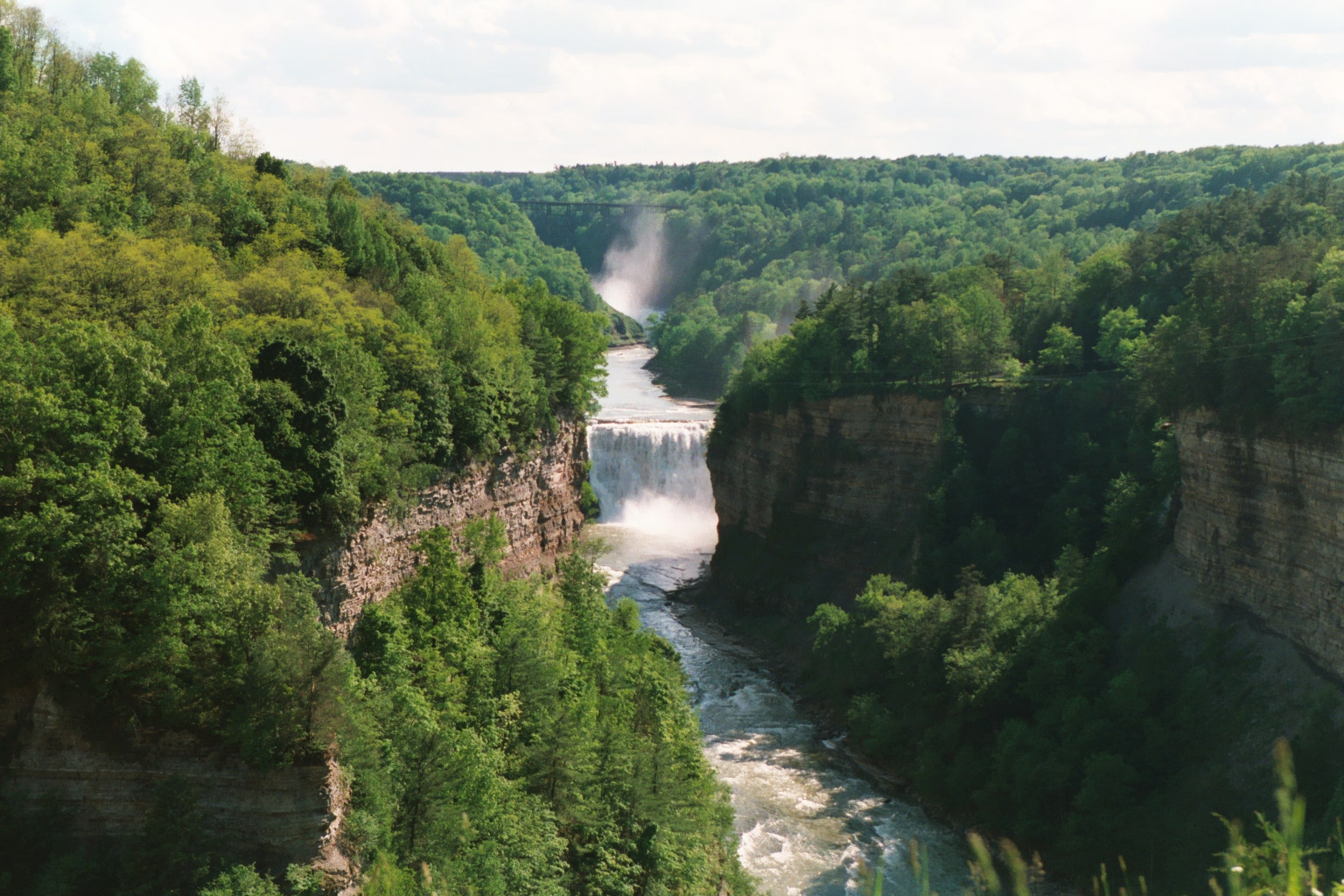
The Middle Falls in Letchworth State Park

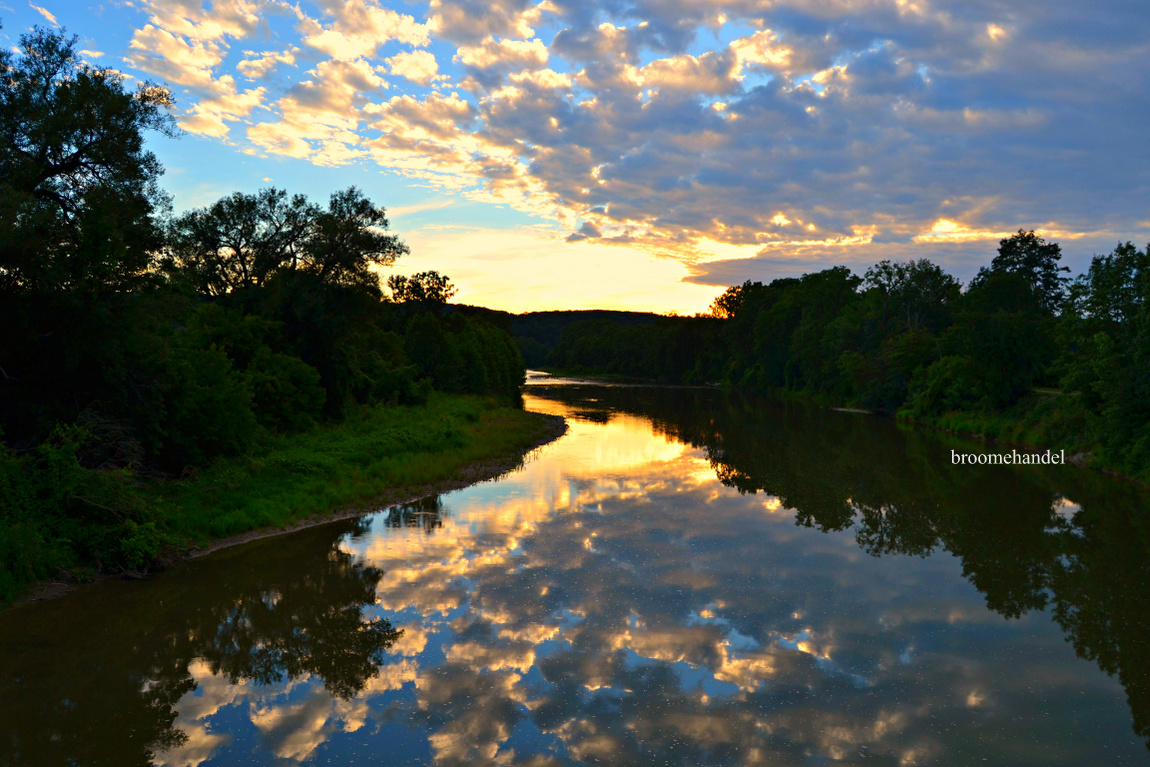
Genesee River in the Town of Caneadea

== Literature ==
The Genesee has been the subject of books and poetry:

- Valley of the Genesee: A Poem by Charles Edwin Furman (1879)
- By the Genesee: Rhymes and Verses by Thomas Thackeray Swinburne (1900)
- Genesee Fever by Carl Carmer (1941); a novel about the early settlement of the Genesee Valley.
- A River Ramble: Saga of the Genesee Valley by Arch Merrill (1943); a walk along the Genesee from its source to its mouth.
- The Genesee by Henry W. Clune (1963); part of the Rivers of America Series

== See also ==
- List of rivers of New York
- List of rivers of Pennsylvania
- Glacial geology of the Genesee River
