= First Databank =

Medical database provider

- Company type: Subsidiary
- Industry: Healthcare; Information technology
- Founded: 1978; 48 years ago
- Headquarters: 2 Tower Place, 21st Floor; South San Francisco, California, U.S.
- Key people: Charles Tuchinda executive chairman); Cynthia MacAskill (senior vice president, finance); Virginia Halsey (senior vice president, strategy and product management)
- Number of employees: 400
- Parent: Hearst Corporation
- Website: fdbhealth.com

First Databank (FDB) is a provider of drug and medical device databases. FDB partners with information system developers to deliver useful medication- and medical device-related information to clinicians, business associates, and patients. FDB is part of Hearst and the Hearst Health network.

== History ==
First Databank was founded in 1977 as a company that published a quarterly magazine of drug prices. They were bought by Hearst Corporation in 1980. First Databank then evolved to become a provider of clinical and descriptive drug knowledge that is integrated into healthcare information systems globally. FDB has its headquarters in San Francisco, California, and has other offices in Indianapolis, Indiana, Exeter, England, Dubai, UAE and Hyderabad, India.

The firm's drug databases support pharmacy dispensing, formulary management, drug pricing analysis, claims processing, computerized physician order entry (CPOE), electronic health records (EHR), electronic medical records (EMR), electronic prescribing (e-Prescribing), electronic medication administration records (EMAR), population health, data analytics, specialty pharmacy, and telemedicine/telehealth.

Beginning in 2011, First Databank's set of National Drug Codes (NDCs) have been integrated into RxNorm's standard clinical drug vocabulary that includes all medications available on the US market. RxNorm is produced and maintained by the United States National Library of Medicine (NLM).

In 2017, FDB acquired Polygot Systems, which simplifies drug information for patients and translates that information into 21 languages.

In 2018, FDB partnered with PetIQ to release the first veterinary medication database to provide information on pet medications structured for integration into pharmacy systems.

Beginning in 2020, FDB partnered with Amazon and its Alexa devices to provide drug information and answer medication questions.

During the COVID-19 pandemic, FDB posted drug data (regarding remdesivir, chloroquine, and hydroxychloroquine) and medical device-related coronavirus information to its website.

== Operations ==
=== FDB MedKnowledge (formerly National Drug Data File Plus) ===
First Databank's MedKnowledge provides prices, descriptions, and collateral clinical information on drugs approved by the US Food and Drug Administration (FDA), plus unapproved drugs, commonly used over-the-counter drugs, herbal remedies, medical foods and nutritional supplements.

=== FDB OrderKnowledge (formerly OrderView Med Knowledge Base) ===
First Databank has developed a drug ordering knowledge base that enables physicians to look up and order drugs. Drug orders are generated based on patient parameters such as age, weight, renal and hepatic impairment, thereby reducing lists of candidate drugs to a minimum. The database is expected to affect the number of adverse drug reactions and side effects at facilities that have adopted the electronic order entry systems.

== Litigation ==
A consumer coalition filed separate suits in a Boston, Massachusetts federal court against drug wholesaler McKesson Corporation and First Databank, accusing the companies of artificially inflating drug prices. The lawsuits say that McKesson and FDB conspired from 2002 through 2005 to set the list prices artificially high. The suit against First DataBank accused it of limiting its survey of wholesalers to a single company, McKesson.

First Databank agreed to a settlement, tentatively approved by the federal court, in which it would not pay damages to the plaintiffs, but agreed to reduce average wholesale prices (AWPs) listed in its databases by five percent for about 2,033 drugs. McKesson chose to fight the suits.

The settlement required First DataBank (FDB) to reduce the AWP mark-up from 1.25 to 1.20 times the Wholesale Acquisition Cost (WAC) for 1,442 NDCs identified in the litigation. FDB set the mark-up at 1.20 for all drugs independent of the litigation on September 26, 2009. The roll back of the WAC-to-AWP spread led to a 4% reduction in their AWP. FDB also stopped publishing AWP data on September 26, 2011, two years after the rollback adjustments were implemented. First DataBank continues to publish non-AWP drug pricing information, including WAC, Direct Price, and suggested wholesale price.
