= Enhanced television =

Enhanced Television (ETV) is a collection of specifications developed under the OpenCable project of CableLabs (Cable Television Laboratories, Inc.) that define an ETV Application consisting of resources (files) adhering to the Enhanced TV Binary Interchange Format (EBIF) content format as well as:

- PNG images
- JPEG images
- PFR downloadable fonts

An ETV application is normally delivered through an MPEG transport stream and accompanies an MPEG program containing video and audio elementary streams.

== ETV Application ==
An ETV Application is a collection of resources (files) that include one or more EBIF resources that represent viewable information in the form of pages.

Two forms of a given ETV Application may be distinguished: (1) an interchange form and (2) an execution form. The interchange form of an ETV Application consists of the resources (files) that represent the compiled application prior to its actual execution by an ETV User Agent. The execution form of an ETV Application consists of the stored, and possibly mutated forms of these resources while being decoded, presented, and executed by an ETV User Agent.

== ETV User Agent ==
An ETV User Agent is a software component that operates on a set-top box, a television, or any other computing environment capable of receiving, decoding, presenting, and processing an ETV Application. This component usually provides, along with its host hardware environment, one or more mechanisms for an end-user to navigate and interact with the multimedia content represented by ETV Applications.
