= Gannett Building =

Historic commercial building in New York, United States

- U.S. National Register of Historic Places
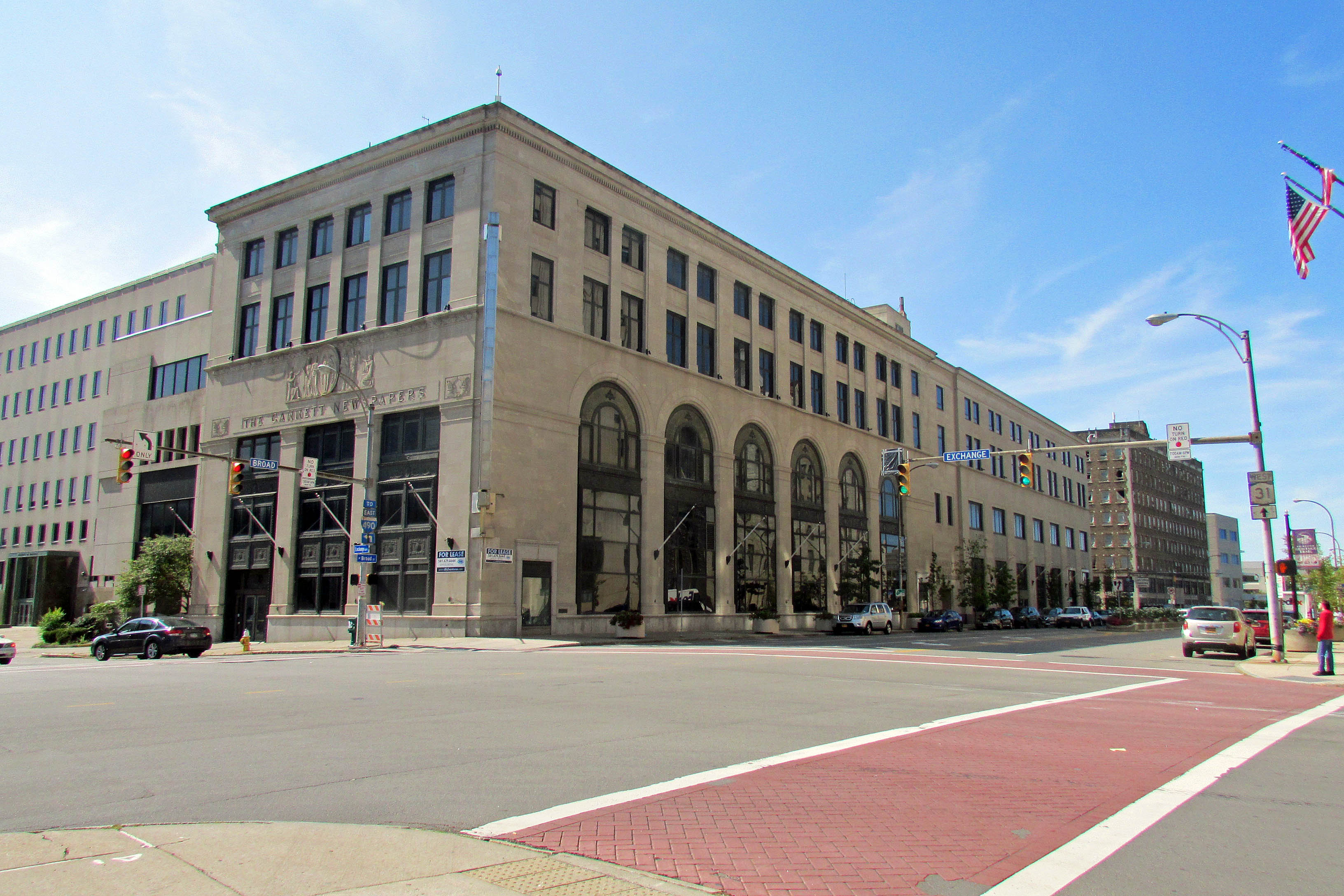
- The Gannett Building in September 2017

- Location within New York Location within the United States
- Location: 55 Exchange St., Rochester, New York
- Coordinates: 43°9′14″N 77°36′45″W
- Area: less than one acre
- Built: 1927
- Architect: Howell & Thomas
- Architectural style: Classical Revival
- MPS: Inner Loop MRA
- NRHP reference No.: 85002862
- Added to NRHP: October 4, 1985

The Gannett Building is a residential and commercial building located in Rochester in Monroe County, New York. It is a Classical Revival style structure constructed in 1927, with four major later additions. It was built to house the consolidated headquarters and newspaper printing facilities for the Gannett Newspapers chain.

One of the building's most visible features is a relief sculpture over the entrance of its east side. It was created by Italian sculptor Edmond Amateis. The work's central figure is Truth, guarding the eternal flame of enlightenment. The figures on the left are Fine Arts and Industry. On the right are Law and Agriculture.

== History ==
Built to house the Rochester Times-Union and the headquarters for Gannett in 1927, a five-story 1949 addition was designed by Albert Kahn to house the printing presses. The Democrat and Chronicle moved into the building in 1959.

The building was listed on the National Register of Historic Places in 1985. and served as the world headquarters for Gannett until 1986.

In 1986, Gannett moved its headquarters from the building to Arlington County, Virginia. In 1997, the printing presses were moved to nearby Greece. That same year, the Times-Union ceased publication, leaving just the Democrat & Chronicle to occupy the building.

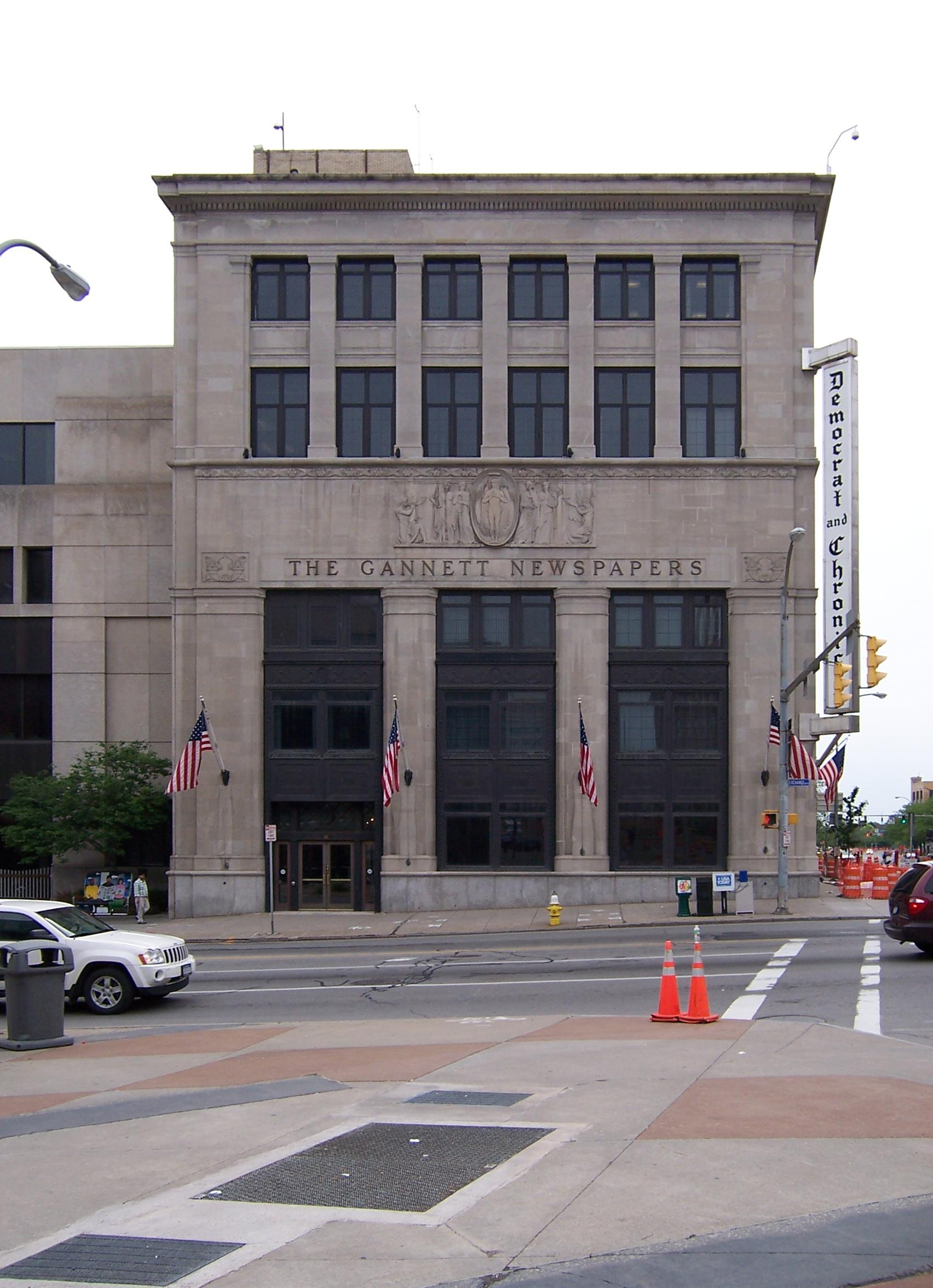
Gannett Building east facade in 2010

In 2014, it was announced that Gannett was selling the Gannett building and moving the Democrat and Chronicle to a new building at the corner of Main Street and Clinton Avenue on the former Midtown Plaza site. At 153,350 square feet (14,247 m^{2}), the Gannett building is considerably larger than the new headquarters, which is 42,000 square feet (3,900 m^{2}). The paper no longer needed the considerable space in the new digital age, where newsprint in the United States is on the decline, and the building, which includes the space that formerly held the presses, is expensive to maintain. As of April 2014, the Gannett building was on the market for sale at an asking price of $3.5 million. The Democrat and Chronicle moved to its new location on May 2, 2016.

After the departure of the newspaper, the building was renovated to house 94 one and two-bedroom lofts, along with commercial space under the name The Edmond.
