= MetaTV =

MetaTV (assets purchased by TVWorks)
- Company type: Subsidiary (of Comcast)
- Founded: Sausalito, California, USA
- Headquarters: Mill Valley, California, {{{location_country}}}
- Key people: Ranjit Sahota (founder), John Carney (co-founder), Andrew Lev (co-founder), Irv Kalick (CEO 2002-2005)
- Industry: Interactive Television
- Employees: 100

MetaTV was founded in 1999 on the promise of providing a better way to consume interactive content on TV. Initially, MetaTV created technologies to target existing set-top box infrastructure. Early customers included InnMedia (services targeted to Liberate set-top boxes) and MSNBC (services targeted to WebTV). In order to enable a better consumer experience and provide cross set-top and cross MSO capabilities, MetaTV shifted to developing a set-top box browser-like application to provide common functions across set-top boxes (abstracting middleware behaviors) and to exploit individual set-top box capabilities.

With the help of Redpoint Ventures, MetaTV raised initial funding of $11M on May 8, 2000. MetaTV’s second round of funding for $21M, in April 2002, was led by Cable giants Comcast and Cox Communications. Cox went on to deploy a precursor of the EBIF cable standard developed by MetaTV that focused on unbound applications, which are available independent of a current video program.

In 2005, MetaTV contributed the binary wire protocol and user agent specifications to become the basis for the CableLabs standard for interactive television known as EBIF (Enhanced TV Binary Interchange Format).

In April 2005, Comcast and Cox purchased the assets of MetaTV and rolled the assets and people into TVWorks, the joint software venture between the parties, originally formed to house the assets purchased from Liberate Technologies. The TVWorks team continued to evolve the EBIF specification and to develop the surrounding technology necessary to deploy implementations of the now public specification.

The EBIF technology is deployed in millions of set-top boxes across the US and has also been trialed by Satellite and Telco service operators - including Verizon.
