= Arch Merrill =

American journalist, and author

- Born: Archie Hayes Merrill; August 5, 1894; Sandusky, New York, U.S.
- Died: July 15, 1974 (aged 79)
- Resting place: Brighton Cemetery, Rochester, New York, U.S.
- Education: Hobart College
- Occupations: Journalist; writer; poet
- Spouse: Katherine Marie Towell
- Children: 1

Archie Hayes Merrill (August 5, 1894 – July 15, 1974) was an American journalist, writer, and poet sometimes called the "Poet Laureate of Upstate New York".

== Biography ==
Arch Merrill was born in Sandusky, New York, near Arcade, and attended high school near Buffalo, and in 1915 attended Hobart College in Geneva, New York, for one year, during which time he worked on the student newspaper, The Herald. He enlisted in the U.S. Army in 1916 and served in France during World War I with Company B, 33rd Engineers. Upon returning to the States in 1919 after the war, Merrill worked short stints as a newspaper journalist in Washington, D.C., Detroit, Michigan, and New York City through 1922.

While working in New York he married Katherine Marie Towell. The Merrills had a daughter named Marion who was born in 1923, the year Merrill became a copy reader with the Rochester, New York, newspaper the Democrat and Chronicle. He was a reporter for the Rochester Journal-American from 1927 to 1937, and then returned to the Democrat and Chronicle as assistant city editor, and for the next 27 years, as Merrill recalled, he "held nearly every post in the city news room".

There, in 1939, he began writing the first of an eventual 1,650 stories and columns for the Sunday Democrat and Chronicle, primarily chronicling the history of Rochester and environs. These articles were collected and expanded to form Merrill's long string of non-fiction books. After retiring in 1963, he continued to write his column, "Arch Merrill's History", for 10 more years.

A prolific writer, he was best known for his articles in the Sunday paper on history and folklore of the Genesse Valley and the Finger Lakes of upstate New York. Sometimes called the "Poet Laureate of Upstate New York", he authored a number of books, most of which are collections of his articles. His 1943 A River Ramble is an account of his walk of the entire length of the Genesee River, along with his notes on local history, folk tales, and people he met along the route.

Merrill died July 15, 1974, and is buried in the Brighton Cemetery at the end of Hoyt Place in the City of Rochester.

== Bibliography ==
- A River Ramble: Saga of the Genesee Valley (Rochester, NY, Louis Heindl & Son, 1943)
- The Lakes Country (Rochester, NY, Louis Heindl & Son, 1944)
- The Ridge: Ontario's Blossom Country (Rochester, NY, Louis Heindl & Son, 1944)
- The Towpath (Rochester, NY, Louis Heindl & Son, 1945)
- Rochester Sketchbook (Rochester, NY, Louis Heindl & Son, 1946)
- Stagecoach Towns (Rochester, NY, Louis Heindl & Son, 1947)
- Tomahawks and Old Lace: Tales of Western New York (Rochester, NY, Henderson-Mosher, Inc., 1948)
- Land of the Senecas (New York, American Book-Stratford Press, [1949])
- Upstate Echoes (New York, American Book-Stratford Press, [1950])
- Slim Fingers Beckon (New York, American Book-Stratford Press, [1951]) $2.00
- Shadows on the Wall (New York, American Book-Stratford Press, [1952]) $2.00
- Southern Tier: Volume One (New York, American Book-Stratford Press / Rochester, Seneca Book Binding Co.,[1953]) $2.50
- Southern Tier: Volume Two (New York, American Book-Stratford Press / Rochester, Seneca Book Binding Co., [1954]) $2.50
- The White Woman and Her Valley (New York, American Book-Stratford Press / Rochester, Seneca Book Binding Co., [1955]) $2.50
- Our Goodly Heritage (New York, American Book-Stratford Press / Rochester, Seneca Book Binding Co., [1956]) $2.50
- Pioneer Profiles (New York, American Book-Stratford Press / Rochester, Seneca Book Binding Co., 1957) $2.50
- Bloomers and Bugles (New York, American Book-Stratford Press / Rochester, Seneca Book Binding Co., 1958) $2.75
- Gaslights and Gingerbread (New York, American Book-Stratford Press / Rochester, Seneca Book Binding Co., 1959) $2.75
- Fame in Our Time (New York, American Book-Stratford Press / Rochester, Seneca Book Binding Co., 1960) $2.95
- Down the Lore Lanes (New York, American Book-Stratford Press / Rochester, Seneca Book Binding Co., 1961) $2.95
- The Underground, Freedom's Road and Other Upstate Tales (New York, American Book-Stratford Press / Rochester, Seneca Book Binding Co., 1963) $2.95
- The Changing Years (New York, American Book-Stratford Press / Rochester, Seneca Book Binding Co., 1967) $3.75
- From Pumpkin Hook to Dumpling Hill (New York, American Book-Stratford Press / Rochester, Creek Books, 1969) $3.95
