= OEDN =

OCAP EBIF Developer Network
- Abbreviation: OEDN
- Formation: 1 October 2007
- Type: Interactive Television, Software development and Community
- Legal status: foundation
- Purpose: the promotion of OCAP tru2way and EBIF application development for digital cable television
- Headquarters: New York, NY
- Location: United States
- Region served: Global
- Main organ: governance board
- Affiliations: Time Warner Cable
- Website: www.oedn.net

OEDN is an OpenCable Application Platform (OCAP) EBIF Developer Network that was founded in October, 2007. It is an online developer network for the promotion of Interactive Television application and service development on digital cable television.

The goal of the network is to support the emerging and long-term needs of software engineers and product teams who are building OCAP (tru2way) and EBIF applications. The goal is to run it not only on digital cable television, but also converged applications and services spanning mobile and broadband devices.

OEDN.net is a networked Community of Practice with a membership constituency drawn from cable companies, ITV application vendors, content providers, programming networks, advertisers, academic interactive media researchers and independent consultants.
