= Rochester Times-Union =

Evening newspaper in Rochester, New York

Times-Union
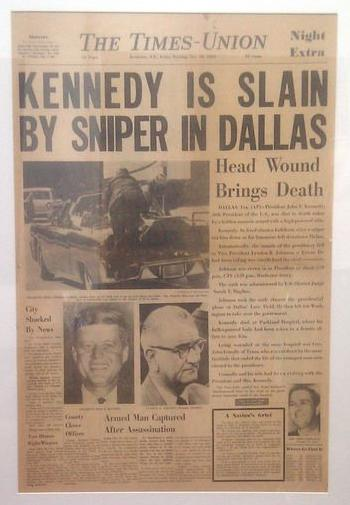
- A Times-Union headline dated November 22, 1963 featuring the assassination of President John F. Kennedy
- Type: Daily newspaper
- Format: Broadsheet
- Owner: Gannett Company (As Gannett Rochester Newspapers)
- Founded: 1918; 108 years ago
- Ceased publication: June 27, 1997; 29 years ago (merged into Democrat and Chronicle)
- Headquarters: Gannett Building, 55 Exchange Boulevard; Rochester, New York 14614; United States

The Times-Union was a daily evening newspaper in the greater Rochester, New York, area for 79 years. It was published as an afternoon daily counterpart to the morning Democrat and Chronicle under the ownership of Gannett when it ceased operations in 1997. In that year the paper merged with the Democrat and Chronicle, with which it had shared a staff since 1992.

The Rochester Advertiser began in 1826 with publisher Luther Tucker. It was acquired by the Rochester Union which was bought by Frank Gannett. In 1918 Gannett merged it with Evening Times to form the Times-Union. Ten years later Gannett purchased the 100-year-old Democrat and Chronicle, the paper with which the Times-Union ultimately merged in 1997.

By 1963, the newspaper was known as just The Times-Union.

The Times-Union, for most of its existence from 1928 until 1997, was based out of the Gannett Building at 55 Exchange Boulevard which was also the headquarters for Gannett and USA Today until 1985. The building, although it was later shared with the sister Democrat and Chronicle who moved into the building in 1959, was originally built for Gannett and the Times-Union and still features an interlocking TU over the front door.

== Awards ==
The paper won a Pulitzer Prize for covering the 1971 Attica Prison riots.
