= Rochester Journal-American =

The Rochester Journal-American was an American newspaper in Rochester, New York owned by William Randolph Hearst.

== History ==
The Rochester Evening Journal began operations in 1922, as part of an statewide expansion planned by Hearst, who was eyeing a gubernatorial seat. The Sunday edition was known as the Rochester American.

During the early 1930s, the paper came under scrutiny for flouting Section 7-a of the National Recovery Act, which certified workers' rights to form labor unions. After three weeks of conferences with the fledgling Newspaper Guild, the newspaper's management posted on the bulletin board notice that read in part:

The newspaper does not recognize the guild and cannot do so in any negotiation. The publisher recognizes the right of the employees to organize and to belong to any organization, including the K.K.K. But any negotiations must be with elected representatives of the editorial employees in which the entire staff has a voice, regardless of membership in any outside organization.

The paper ceased publication in 1937, when Hearst sold the paper to the Gannetts, owners of the Journal-American's rival papers.

== Notable personnel ==
Sometime prior to 1935, the Rochester Journal-American was published by Meyer Jacobstein, Ph.D.

Journalist, author and poet Arch Merrill, who would be a reporter and editor at the Rochester Democrat and Chronicle for 27 years beginning in 1937, worked at the Rochester Journal-American from 1927 to 1937.

Joe Simon, who with Jack Kirby would create the comic-book character Captain America in 1940, had his first job out of high school at the Journal-American in 1932. He was hired by art director Adolph Edler as an assistant, replacing Simon's future comics colleague Al Liederman, who had quit. In-between production duties, Simon did occasional sports and editorial cartoons for the paper.
