= Democrat and Chronicle =

Daily newspaper in Rochester, New York

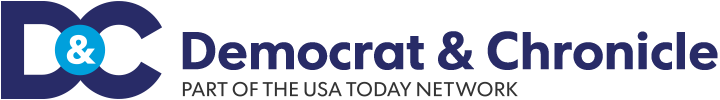

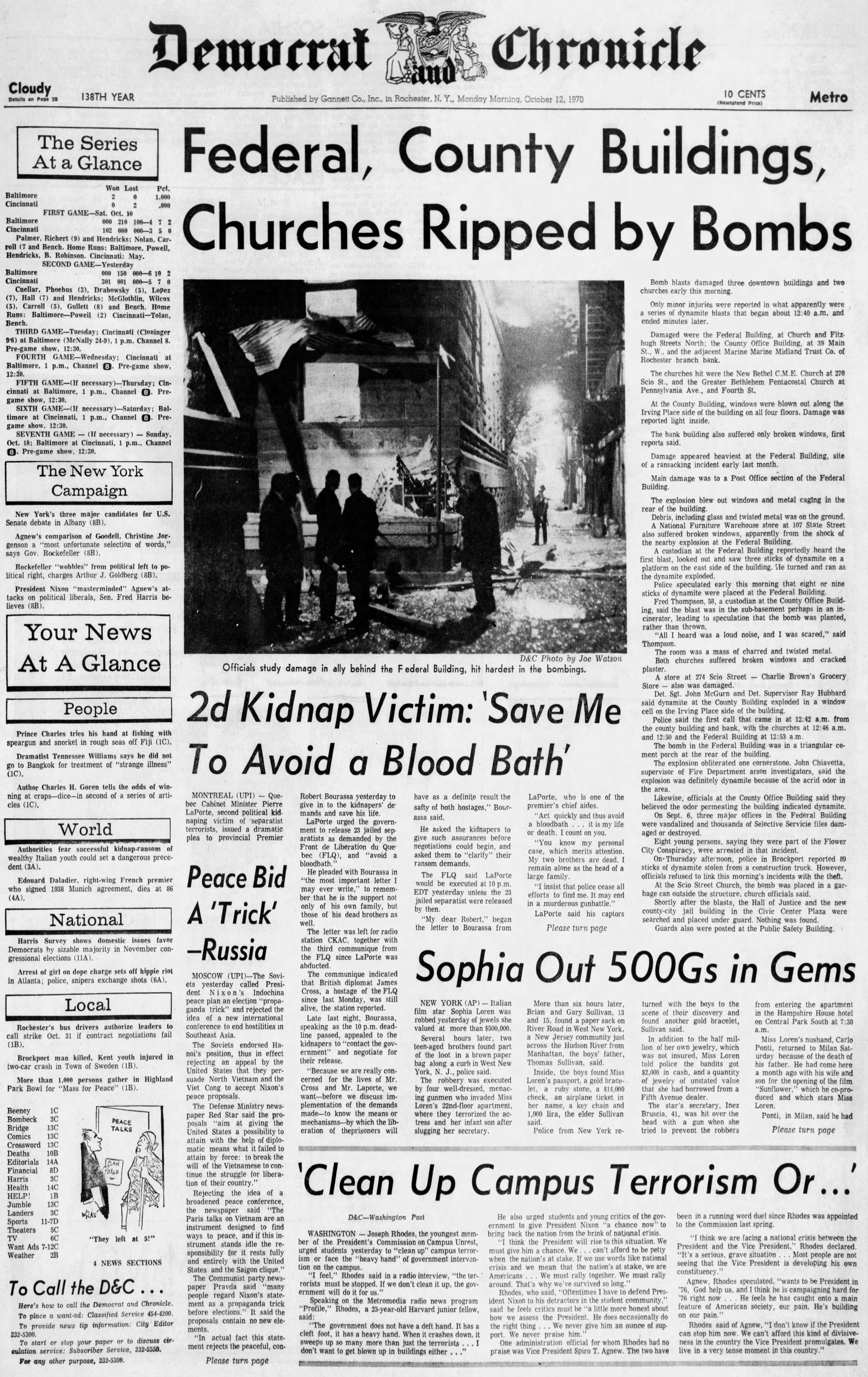
- Front page on October 12, 1970, covering the Rochester bombings
- Type: Daily newspaper
- Format: Broadsheet
- Owner: USA Today Co.
- Editor: Michael Kilian
- Founded: 1833; 193 years ago (as The Balance)
- Language: English
- Headquarters: 21 Goodway Drive; Henrietta, New York; United States
- Circulation: 25,000 Digital Subscribers: 27,569 daily; 42,355 Sunday; (as of Q3 2022)
- ISSN: 1088-5153
- Website: democratandchronicle.com

The Democrat and Chronicle is a daily newspaper serving the greater Rochester, New York, area. Headquartered at 21 Goodway Drive in Henrietta, New York, the Democrat and Chronicle operates under the ownership of USA Today Co. The paper's production facility is in Rockaway, New Jersey. Since the Times-Union merger in 1997, the Democrat and Chronicle is Rochester's only daily circulated newspaper.

== History ==
=== 19th century ===
Founded in 1833 as The Balance, the paper eventually became known as the Daily Democrat. The Daily Democrat merged with another local paper, the Chronicle, in 1870, to become known as the Democrat and Chronicle.

=== 20th century ===
The paper was purchased by Gannett in 1928. Prior to 1959, the newspaper was headquartered at 59-61 E. Main Street, on Rochester's Main Street Bridge.

From 1928 to 1985, the Democrat and Chronicle was Gannett's flagship paper. In 1959, the newspaper relocated to Gannett's headquarters in the Gannett Building at 55 Exchange Boulevard. It shared the space with the Rochester Times-Union, an afternoon daily paper. Gannett moved its headquarters to Tysons Corner, Virginia, home of USA Today, in 1985. Over time, Gannett merged the Times-Union into the Democrat and Chronicle. Their staffs were merged in 1992, and the Times-Union circulation ended in 1997. That same year, newspaper production was relocated from the Gannett Building to a facility in Greece, New York.

=== 21st century ===
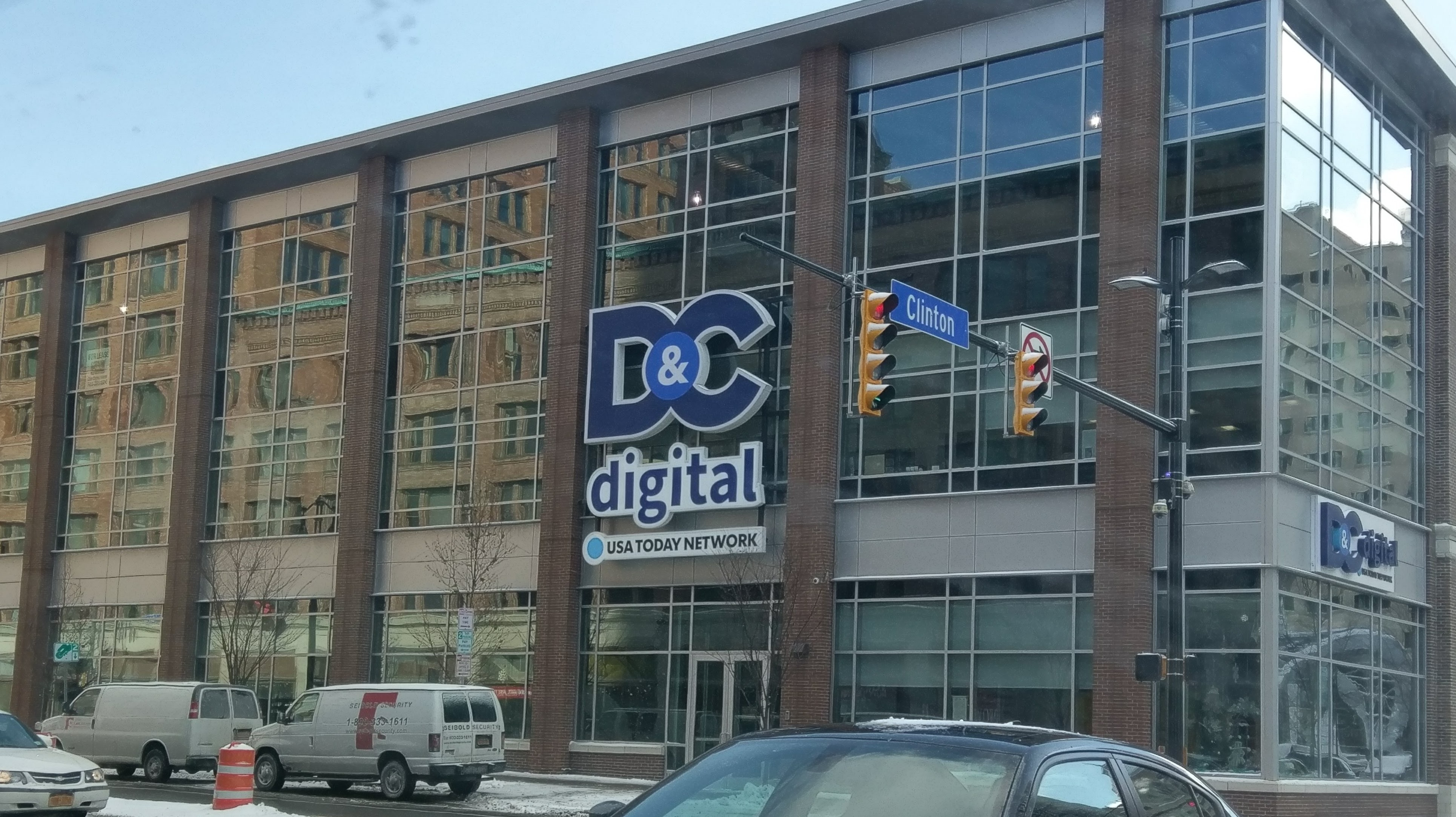
The Democrat and Chronicle building at Midtown Plaza in Rochester, New York

In May 2016, the Democrat and Chronicle relocated its headquarters to a new, smaller building at the Midtown Plaza site on East Main Street. At 153,350 square feet, the former headquarters in the Gannett building was considerably larger than the current headquarters, which is 42,000 square feet. The Democrat and Chronicle no longer needed the much larger space in the building, which included the area that formerly held the printing presses before 1996, which was expensive to maintain.

With the move came new branding as D&C Digital, emphasizing focus on the outlet's digital marketing services and video properties.

In 2010, The Democrat and Chronicle ranked number one among US newspapers in market penetration, the percentage of readers in a metro area who read in print or online. The Democrat and Chronicle held that top spot for several years, and have been among the leaders since the 1990s.

In 2023, the paper announced it would relocate its printing offices from Greece, New York to Rockaway, New Jersey that April.

In August and September 2026, the Democrat and Chronicle vacated its East Main Street headquarters, moving its offices to SPOT cowork, a shared office space in Henrietta, New York. The D&C Digital sign is set to be removed from the downtown building on September 28, 2026.

=== Sexual abuse scandal ===
The Democrat and Chronicle, along with its parent company Gannett, was sued in October 2019 by a former paperboy who accused the newspaper of enabling a former district manager to sexually abuse him in the 1980s. In late 2018, this former paperboy emailed investigative reporters and Gannett management, asking them to investigate his claims. Karen Magnuson, then Executive Editor for Gannett's Democrat & Chronicle, told reporters to put their investigative reporting of abuse claims on "pause" and brought the email to the attention of Gannett's management to conduct their own investigation. Gannett COO Michael G. Kane then sent the original claimant a letter indicating no evidence had been found and they were "closing out" the matter. Shortly after, New York passed its Child Victim Act, lifting the statute of limitations on child sex abuse claims. This initial case is currently pending. Four more lawsuits were filed in early 2020. Additionally, three more men filed suit against Gannett for child sex abuse in September 2020. As the New York state window to file under its Childs Victim Act closed in August 2021, a ninth man sued the Democrat and Chronicle, and its publisher Gannett, in Rochester NY alleging child sex abuse by the same former district manager of paper carriers. In July 2022, Gannett defense attorneys notified the court of their intent to file a motion to have the former paperboy's Child Victims Act cases taken "out of the state court system and turn them over to the New York Workers' Compensation Board" stating that the 11-14-year-old paperboys should have applied for workman's compensation at the time of their injuries in the 1980s, or in 2019 upon enactment of the CVA as it is a simple online process. All these cases are currently pending in New York State court.

Nearly three years after the first lawsuit filing, in July 2022, Gannett (the parent company and publisher of the Democrat & Chronicle) defense attorneys notified the court of their intent to file a motion to have the former paperboys' Child Victims Act cases taken "out of the state court system and turn them over to the New York Workers' Compensation Board" stating that the 11–14-year-old paperboys should have applied for workman's compensation at the time of their injuries in the 1980s or upon enactment of the CVA in 2019. In December 2022, presiding Judge, Deborah A. Chimes acquiesced to Gannett's demands that NY Workers Compensation Board – despite the existence of the Child Victims Act as NY State law – determine if Plaintiffs have a valid cause of action for damages or whether they are limited to benefits under the Worker's Compensation Law. This despite the fact that the Workers Compensation Board has no mechanism to consider this question of justice and legal rights, as the Board is tasked by the state of New York solely to: "administer workers' compensation, disability benefits and Paid Family Leave." On July 26, 2024, this demand of Gannett, received and accepted fully by Judge Deborah Chimes, was reversed, by the Fourth Judicial Department of the Appellate Division of the New York State Supreme Court. The nine plaintiff cases remain pending action by Judge Chimes and her court.

== Notable contributors ==
- Earl Caldwell
- Henry W. Clune
- Marie D. De Jesus, photojournalist
- Arch Merrill
- Manuel Rivera-Ortiz
- Brian Rooney, correspondent, ABC News
- W. D. Storey, former editor-in-chief
- Michael Walsh
