= Henry W. Clune =

American novelist

Henry W. Clune (February 8, 1890 – October 9, 1995) was an American writer. A well-known journalist for the Democrat and Chronicle newspaper in Rochester, New York, his column "Seen and Heard" was published in that paper for 55 years. He also penned 14 books; including six novels.

== Life and career ==
Clune was born in Rochester, New York. As a young boy he lived in the Linden Street neighborhood of the fourteenth ward. He attended West High School and for a short time was a student at Phillips Academy in Andover, Massachusetts.

At the age of twenty, Clune joined the staff of the Rochester Democrat and Chronicle, first as a volunteer, then as a paid employee. From 1914 through 1969 his column "Seen and Heard" appeared in the paper. The column captured the color and flavor of life in Rochester, and was based on thousands of interviews Clune conducted with residents and visitors to the city. In 1933 a compilation of Clune's newspaper columns was published in the book Seen and Heard.

Clune also penned 14 books which encompassed 6 novels, several collections of shorter pieces, and historical non-fiction.

=== Family ===
In 1921, Clune married Charlotte Boyle, a national swimming champion who competed in the 1920 Olympics. The Clunes, who had four sons, lived for many years in Scottsville, New York. Clune died on October 9, 1995, at the age of 105. Mrs. Clune died in 1990 at the age of 91.

=== Honors ===
In 1963, Henry Clune was named a Fellow of the Rochester Museum of Arts and Sciences and in 1965 he was given the Friends of the Rochester Public Library's Annual Literary Award.

== Books ==
- Seen & Heard, Selections from Seen and Heard (Rochester, New York, The Democrat and Chronicle, 1933)
- Seen & Heard, Selections from Seen and Heard; Volume Two (Rochester, New York, The Democrat and Chronicle, 1935)
- The Good Die Poor (New York, Longmans, Green and Co., 1937)
- Monkey on a Stick (New York, William Morrow and Company, 1940)
- Main Street Beat (New York, W. W. Norton & Co., Inc., 1947)
- By His Own Hand (New York, The Macmillan Company, 1952)
- The Big Fella (New York, The Macmillan Company, 1956)
- Six O'clock Casual (New York, The Macmillan Company, 1960)
- The Genesee, illustrated by Douglas Gorsline (New York, Holt, Rinehart & Winston, 1963)
- The Best of Henry Clune in the Democrat & Chronicle (Privately Printed, 1965)
- O'Shaughnessy's Cafe (New York, The Macmillan Company, 1969)
- The Rochester I Know (New York, Doubleday & Company, Inc., 1972)
- I Always Liked It Here, Reminiscences of a Rochesterian (Rochester, New York, Friends of the University of Rochester Libraries, 1983)
- Souvenir and Other Stories, illustrated by Marilyn Reynolds (Geneseo, James Brunner, 1990)
