= Journal Inquirer =

Daily newspaper in Connecticut

- "The JI tells it like it is. Somebody has to."
- Type: Daily newspaper
- Format: Tabloid
- Owner: Hearst Communications
- Publisher: Mike DeLuca
- Editor: Neill Ostrout
- Founded: 1968
- Headquarters: 306 Progress Drive; Manchester, Connecticut 06045; United States
- Website: www.ctinsider.com/journalinquirer/

The Journal Inquirer is a daily newspaper published on Monday to Friday afternoons and Saturday mornings from Manchester, Connecticut. The Journal Inquirer serves 17 towns in the north-central part of the state of Connecticut.

== History ==
In 1967, Neil Ellis, a real estate developer with an interest in journalism, bought two weekly newspapers, the Rockville Journal and South and East Windsor Inquirer. The weeklies were merged into the daily Journal Inquirer in 1968.

The paper moved from a garage in the Rockville section of Vernon to its present location in Manchester in 1974. The Rockville Journal dates back over 105 years.

Elizabeth S. Ellis, the founder's partner, oversaw paper's expansion during her tenure as publisher from 1970 until her death in 2020. As a female-in-charge, she was a rarity in journalism.

In June 2023, the Journal Inquirer was acquired by Hearst Communications.

== Area served ==
The regional paper prints in three editions:

- 1st edition: Enfield, Somers, Suffield, East Windsor, Windsor and Windsor Locks.
- 2nd edition: Manchester, East Hartford, Bolton, Andover, Coventry and Hebron.
- 3rd edition: Vernon, Ellington, Tolland, South Windsor, and Stafford.

Fringe towns with some circulation but limited coverage include Willington, Union, Glastonbury and the city of Hartford.

The Journal Inquirer uses the "Oxford" or serial comma, unlike most American newspapers that follow The Associated Press Stylebook.

== See also ==
- Manchester, Connecticut
