= Customer-premises equipment =

Terminal and associated equipment located at a subscriber's premises

In telecommunications, a customer-premises equipment or customer-provided equipment (CPE) is any terminal and associated equipment located at a subscriber's premises and connected with a carrier's telecommunication circuit at the demarcation point ("demarc"). The demarc is a point established in a building or complex to separate customer equipment from the equipment located in either the distribution infrastructure or central office of the communications service provider.

CPE generally refers to devices such as telephones, routers, network switches, residential gateways (RG), set-top boxes, fixed mobile convergence products, home networking adapters and Internet access gateways that enable consumers to access providers' communication services and distribute them in a residence or enterprise with a local area network (LAN).

A CPE can be an active equipment, as the ones mentioned above, or passive equipment such as analog telephone adapters (ATA) or xDSL-splitters. This includes key telephone systems and most private branch exchanges. Excluded from the CPE category are overvoltage protection equipment and pay telephones. Other types of materials that are necessary for the delivery of the telecommunication service, but are not defined as equipment, such as manuals and cable packages, and cable adapters are instead referred to as CPE-peripherals.

CPE can refer to devices purchased by the subscriber, or to those provided by the operator or service provider.

== History ==
The two phrases, "customer-premises equipment" and "customer-provided equipment", reflect the history of this equipment.

Under the Bell System monopoly in the United States (post Communications Act of 1934), the Bell System owned the telephones, and one could not attach privately owned or supplied devices to the network, or to the station apparatus. Telephones were located on customers' premises, hence, customer-premises equipment. In the U.S. Federal Communications Commission (FCC) proceeding the Second Computer Inquiry, the FCC ruled that telecommunications carriers could no longer bundle CPE with telecommunications service, uncoupling the market power of the telecommunications service monopoly from the CPE market, and creating a competitive CPE market.

With the gradual breakup of the Bell monopoly, starting with Hush-A-Phone v. United States [1956], which allowed some non-Bell owned equipment to be connected to the network (a process called interconnection), equipment on customers' premises became increasingly owned by customers. Indeed, subscribers were eventually permitted to purchase telephones – hence, customer-provided equipment.

In the pay-TV industry many operators and service providers offer subscribers a set-top box with which to receive video services, in return for a monthly fee. As offerings have evolved to include multiple services [voice and data] operators have increasingly given consumers the opportunity to rent or buy additional devices like access modems, internet gateways and video extenders that enable them to access multiple services, and distribute them to a range of consumer electronics devices in the home.

== Technology evolution ==
=== Hybrid devices ===
The growth of multiple system operators, offering triple or quad-play services, required the development of hybrid CPE to make it easy for subscribers to access voice, video and data services. The development of this technology was led by Pay TV operators looking for a way to deliver video services via both traditional broadcast and broadband IP networks. Spain's Telefonica was the first operator to launch a hybrid broadcast and broadband TV service in 2003 with its Movistar TV DTT/IPTV offering, while Polish satellite operator 'n' was the first to offer its subscribers a Three-way hybrid (or Tri-brid) broadcast and broadband TV service, which launched in 2009

=== Set-back box ===
The term set-back box is used in the digital TV industry to describe a piece of consumer hardware that enables them to access both linear broadcast and internet-based video content, plus a range of interactive services like Electronic Programme Guides (EPG), Pay Per View (PPV) and video on demand (VOD) as well as internet browsing, and view them on a large screen television set. Unlike standard set-top boxes, which sit on top of or below the TV, a set-back box has a smaller form factor to enable it to be mounted to the rear of the display panel flat panel TV, hiding it from view.

=== Residential gateway ===
A residential gateway is a networking device used to connect devices in the home to the Internet or other wide area network (WAN). It is an umbrella term, used to cover multi-function networking appliances used in homes, which may combine a DSL modem or cable modem, a network switch, a consumer-grade router, and a wireless access point. In the past, such functions were provided by separate devices, but in recent years technological convergence has enabled multiple functions to be merged into a single device.

One of the first home gateway devices to be launched was selected by Telecom Italia to enable the operator to offer triple play services in 2002: Along with a SIP VoIP handset for making voice calls, it enabled subscribers to access voice, video and data services over a 10MB symmetrical ADSL fiber connection.

=== Virtual gateway ===
The virtual gateway concept enables consumers to access video and data services and distribute them around their homes using software rather than hardware. The first virtual gateway was introduced in 2010 by Advanced Digital Broadcast at the IBC exhibition in Amsterdam. The ADB Virtual Gateway uses software that resides within the middleware and is based on open standards, including DLNA home networking and the DTCP-IP standard, to ensure that all content, including paid-for encrypted content like Pay TV services, can only be accessed by secure CE devices.

== Broadband ==
A subscriber unit, or SU is a broadband radio that is installed at a business or residential location to connect to an access point to send/receive high speed data wired or wirelessly. Devices commonly referred to as a subscriber unit include cable modems, access gateways, home networking adapters and mobile phones. Example brands and vendors include SpeedTouch, DrayTek, Ubee Interactive, 2Wire and Efficient Networks.

== WAN ==
CPE may also refer to any devices that terminate a WAN circuit, such as an ISDN, E-carrier/T-carrier, DSL, or metro Ethernet. This includes any customer-owned hardware at the customer's site: routers, firewalls, network switches, PBXs, VoIP gateways, sometimes CSU/DSU and modems.

Application areas:

- Connected home
- Pay TV
- Over-the-top Media Services
- Broadband
- Voice over IP
- Fixed–mobile convergence [FMC]
- MPLS (CPE device is used interchangeably with customer edge router)

== Other uses ==
- Cellular carriers may sometimes internally refer to cellular phones a customer has purchased without a subsidy or from a third party as "customer provided equipment."
- It is also notable that the fully qualified domain name and the PTR record of DSL and cable lines connected to a residence will often contain 'cpe'.

== See also ==
- Demarcation point
- Interconnection
- On-premises wiring
- Terminal equipment
- TR-069
