= Ubee =

Ubee may refer to:

- Ubee Interactive, a Taiwanese telecommunications company
- Sydney Richard Ubee (1903–1998), Royal Air Force officer

== See also ==
- UBEE
