= On-screen display =

Superimposed image

OSD on a television displaying the current channel and volume

An on-screen display (OSD) is an image superimposed on a screen picture, commonly used by modern television sets, VCRs, and DVD players to display information such as volume, channel, and time.

== History ==
In the past, most adjustments on TV sets were performed with analog controls such as potentiometers and switches. This was used more recently also in monochrome portable TVs. After remote controls were invented, digital adjustments became common. They needed an external display, which was LED, LCD, or VFD based. Including this display increased manufacturing costs.

When electronics became more advanced, it became clear that adding some extra devices for an OSD was cheaper than adding a second display device. TV screens had become much bigger and could display much more information than a small second display. OSDs display graphical information superimposed over the picture, which is done by synchronizing the reading from OSD video memory with the TV signal.

Some of the first OSD-equipped televisions were introduced by RCA in the late 1970s, simply displaying the channel number and the time of day at the bottom of the screen. An OSD chip, also known as jungle chip, was added to the General Instrument tuning chip set designed in conjunction with RCA and Telefunken. The original OSD was merely to placate users who were faced with a snowy screen during auto tuning. Something the original architecture had not seen as an issue until it was first demonstrated. Once a display had been injected, at least in 1981, a real-time clock (RTC) was added to display time and date on video terminals (with greater performance in 1996).

A CRT TV with various green OSD menus

In the 1980s, OSD-capable TVs started to be more common, such as Zenith's "System 3" series. Akai have been credited with the introduction of OSD in VCRs in the 1980s, including the introduction of on screen programming. By the mid-1990s, VCRs with these displays became widely available. This made it possible to reduce the size (and cost) of the vacuum fluorescent display (VFD) or LCD in the VCR. Eventually, as VCRs declined in popularity and prices fell, many manufacturers dropped the internal display completely, relying completely on the on-screen display. All DVD players also use on-screen displays. Many PAL television sets use the internal Teletext decoder's graphics rendering system to further reduce costs.

More recently (as of about 2005), the decline in CRT-based TV sets and rise in LCD/plasma televisions has seen the use and availability of dedicated OSD devices decline, as it is more cost effective to integrate OSD functions inside the main graphics processor. Modern LCD television monitors usually incorporate only two or three integrated circuits. Examples of integrated circuits to perform dedicated OSD are MAX7456 and STV5730. Both operate with NTSC or PAL, mixing with an existing signal or self-generating. Both have slightly different capabilities. This can be done by PIC video superimposer too.

== First VCR with on-screen display ==
Akai produced consumer video cassette recorders (VCR) during the 1980s. The Akai VS-2 was the first VCR with an on-screen display, originally named the Interactive Monitor System. By displaying the information directly on the television screen, this innovation eliminated the need for the user to be physically near the VCR to program recording, read the tape counter, or perform other common features. Within a few years, all competing manufacturers had adopted on-screen display technology in their own products.

== Computers ==
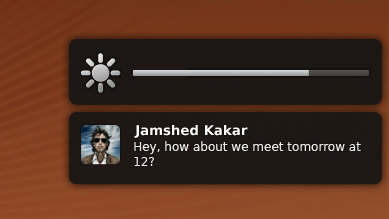
NotifyOSD in Ubuntu

Some computer software also uses OSDs, especially support programs for so-called "enhanced keyboards", which often had additional medias like skipping through music tracks and volume adjustment. Their use outside this field is still uncommon. On-screen displays are also used in camcorders, and can display various information both on the viewfinder and on the TV set the camcorder is connected to.

The complexity of graphics offered by such displays has greatly increased over the years, from simple monochrome images to intricate graphical user interfaces.

Many computer monitors have an OSD menu for configuration.

== Known problems ==
Several problems exist with regard to on-screen displays. One of them is diagnostics if a television's display system is damaged. Without any external screens, it is almost impossible (without opening the TV) to determine the source of the error. TV accessories that depend heavily on OSDs, such as VCRs or DVD players, are also difficult to configure without the use of a TV. On older VCRs, it was possible to program recording timers without turning on the TV; a modern VCR requires the user to turn on the TV to do so. Usability is generally also decreased with OSDs, as it is necessary to control a multitude of parameters with a few buttons, where earlier, real analog controls with mechanical feedback were available.

The drawbacks of using OSDs do not outweigh their main advantage of being more cost-efficient and allowing to design less separate physical tuning controls, which has led to their widespread use.

== See also ==
- Digital on-screen graphic
- Head-up display, in computing and in video gaming
- Television news screen layout
- Character generator
- Chyron Corporation
- Pong
