= Szajna =

Szajna is a Polish-language family name. The surname may refer to:

- Józef Szajna (1922–2008), Polish set designer, director, play writer, theoretician of the theatre, painter and graphic artist
- Jadwiga Szajna-Lewandowska (1912–1994), Polish pianist, music educator and composer
- Janusz C. Szajna (born 1954), Polish entrepreneur and university professor
