= Three-way hybrid =

A three-way hybrid set-top box is a hybrid device typically used by Pay TV operators and Telecommunications service providers to converge content delivered via three different video transport networks – satellite, terrestrial and IP [managed or public Internet]. Three-way Hybrid [or tribrid] Set-Top Boxes enable consumers to navigate between a wide range of content quickly and intuitively, and view it all on the main household TV set.

One of the first operators to deploy a tribrid platform was ITI Neovision's n in Poland, which rolled out their Turbo Dekoder HD in December 2009 using Advanced Digital Broadcast's ADB-5720SX. The deployment won the 2010 IP TV World Forum award for Best Interactive TV service and "best in show" awards.
