= Second Computer Inquiry =

Federal Communications Commission proceeding

The Second Computer Inquiry is the second proceeding in the FCC trilogy The Computer Inquiries, which created the FCC's policy of regulating the way in which telecommunications carriers' networks are opened up and made available to enhanced services (aka computer networks). The proceeding reformed the First Computer Inquiry which established the policy objectives that telecommunications carriers which have market power and the ability to discriminate be regulated, and computer services which were competitive, innovative, and had low barriers to entry, would not be regulated. The FCC saw great promise in the computer services industry and sought to ensure that the telecommunications network was adequately meeting the needs of the computer market. In the Second Computer Inquiry, the FCC created the basic service (telecommunications carriers, regulated) versus enhanced service (computer services, unregulated) dichotomy. Broadly speaking, the FCC concluded that basic telecommunications carriers networks must be open, and, if a telecommunications carrier offers enhanced services, it must do so through a separate corporate subsidiary. Everything that the telecommunications carrier sold to its own enhanced service, must be sold to all other enhanced services on the same terms and conditions. The FCC also restricted the ability of telecommunications carriers to bundle telecommunications services with customer premises equipment (CPE), creating a new competitive market for telephones and modems. These rules were generally codified in Section 64.702 of the Federal Communications Commission's Rules and Regulation.
