= Efficient Networks =

American computer networking company

- Traded as: Nasdaq: EFNT
- Defunct: 2002
- Fate: Acquired by Siemens
- Headquarters: Dallas, United States
- Website: efficient.com at the Wayback Machine (archived 2000-08-15)

Efficient Networks, Inc. was a customer-premises equipment manufacturer. In 2000, it made plans to buy NetScreen Technologies, but abandoned it later that year. Efficient Networks bought FlowPoint from Cabletron Systems in 2002.

Efficient Networks was acquired by Siemens in 2002.

== See also ==
- Telecoms crash
