= Janusz C. Szajna =

Polish entrepreneur, scientist, and professor

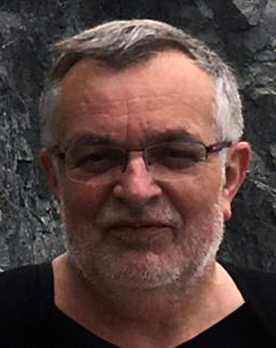
- Szajna in 2023
- Born: 20 July 1954 (age 71); Głogów, Poland
- Occupations: Director of Comp. Eng. Dep. at University ZG (former); President of ADB Poland (former); Professor at University ZG; President of DTP
- Children: 2, including Andrew Szajna

Janusz C. Szajna is a Polish entrepreneur, scientist and university professor. He contributes to the field of computer science, including advising the 'Commission for Digitization, Innovation and Modern Technologies' of the Polish government.

== Career ==
Szajna was the organizer and the first Director of the Computer Engineering and Electronic Department at University of Zielona Góra. At present, he is the lecturer at the Faculty of Mechanical Engineering of the University of Zielona Góra.

Szajna was the co-founder of ADB Group (Advanced Digital Broadcast) (SWX:ADBN), an Information and communications technology company operating in the field of Digital TV. Between 1995 and 2012, he was the President of ADB Poland – ADB Group Corporate R&D Center, which developed software and hardware for Set-top boxes, employing over 500 ICT engineers. Under the leadership of Szajna, the ADB R&D Team received numerous awards, including Cable & Satellite International Product of the Year, Crowned TV Innovator of the Year & Best set-top box technology provider by IMS RESEARCH, Product of the Year by IBC and IPTV World Series Awards.

Szajna is the founder, and since 2013, the President of Digital Technology Poland (DTP), an R&D company in the field of smart industry. He also holds a position in the scientific supervisory board of the EU-funded, multimillion projects granted to DTP.

== Recognition ==
- Szajna was awarded a prestigious title 'Entrepreneur of the Year' by Ernst & Young, in Services category, Poland, 2004.
- In 2015, he was awarded an 'Honorary Badge for Merits for the Lubuskie Voivodeship' (Poland).

== Bibliography ==
With his scientific research and publications, Szajna contributed on the international scale to the computer science fields of computer programming, augmented reality and artificial intelligence, including such publishing houses as Springer:

- The Application of Augmented Reality Technology in the Production Processes, Springer, 2019.
- New Way of Monitoring of the Production Environment with Application of Augmented Reality and Artificial Intelligence, Panova, 2018.
- Application of mixed reality tools for the energy industry, 2017.
- A proposal to implement the postulates of industry 4.0 by means of a system based on multi-agent networks, 2016.
- Parallel controller synthesis using Petri nets, 1995.
- Programming in the design of digital circuits, 1994.
- The use of artificial intelligence methods in computer aided design of digital circuits, 1993.
- Turbo Prolog: programming in the language of logic, 1991.
- The experimental automated digital system designer, 1989.
- Automated state machine design and PAL implementation, 1988.
- The use of dynamic variables of the Pascal language in the minimization of logical functions, 1986.
