= Jungle chip =

Type of integrated circuit

A CRT TV with green OSD menus

A jungle chip, or jungle IC, is an integrated circuit (IC or "chip") found in many analog televisions from the late 1970s and becoming standard by the early 1990s. It takes a composite video signal from the radio frequency receiver electronics and turns it into separate RGB outputs that can be sent to the cathode ray tube (CRT) to produce a display. The jungle IC replaced numerous discrete analog circuits used in earlier televisions, greatly reducing cost, size, and complexity of sets.

Early jungle chips appeared in the 1970s. These were entirely analog devices, which decoded the original signal into RGB and did little else. Later versions normally included a second set of inputs in RGB format that were used to overlay on-screen display (OSD) imagery. These would be connected to a microcontroller that would be included to handle operations like tuning, sleep mode and running the remote control. A separate input called "blanking" switched the jungle outputs between the two inputs on the fly. This was normally triggered at a fixed location on the screen, creating rectangular areas with the digital data overlaying the television signal. This was used for on-screen channel displays, closed captioning support, and similar duties.

Examples of jungle chips include the Motorola MC65585 / MC44002, Philips TDA6361 and Sony CXA1870.

== Use in modifications ==
It's common for old computers and video game consoles to output RGB video signals at the same refresh rate and horizontal scan rate as consumer televisions use, however, not all televisions have connectors that can accept those signals. This is particularly an issue in countries where there was no common video connector (such as the European SCART connector) capable of carrying RGB signals.

A common modification takes advantage of the Jungle IC's RGB input pins by wiring them directly to an added external connector, then triggering the blanking signal to toggle the on screen display. By doing so, the television behaves as an RGB monitor, replacing the in-television on-screen display with the signal from the user's device. This provides a much more colorful and bright display, at the expense of the on screen display no longer being visible. Picture synchronization is provided by an ordinary composite video signal, which is sent into the original signal input.
