= Television set =

Device for receiving and viewing video content

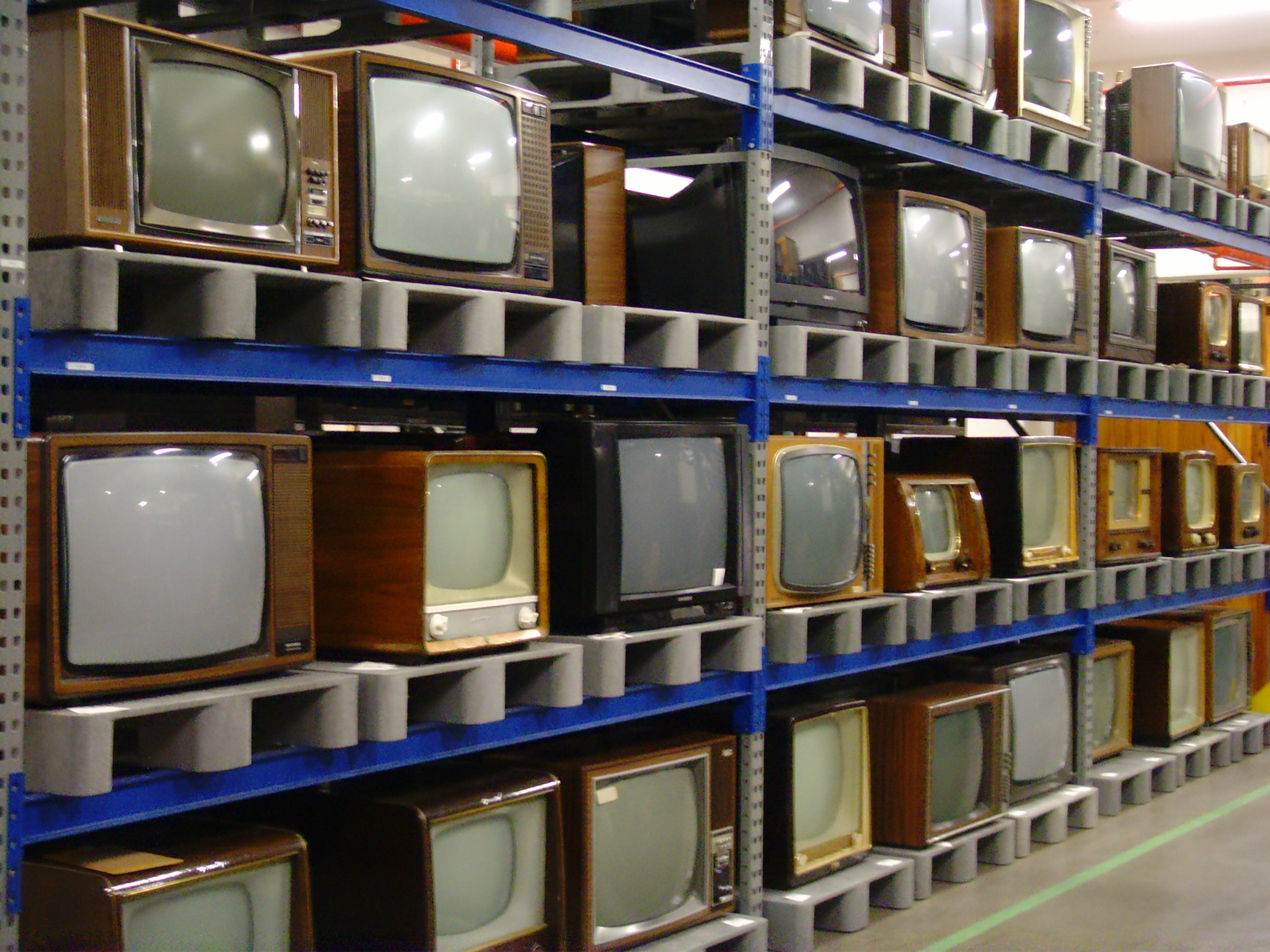
A variety of television sets at the Communication Museum in Frankfurt, Germany in 2010

A television set or television receiver (more commonly called TV, TV set, television, telly, or tele) is an electronic device for viewing and hearing television broadcasts. It combines a tuner, display, and loudspeakers. Introduced in the late 1920s in mechanical form, television sets became a popular consumer product after World War II in electronic form, using cathode ray tube (CRT) technology. The addition of color to broadcast television beginning in 1954 further increased the popularity of television sets in the 1960s, and an outdoor antenna became a common feature of suburban homes. The ubiquitous television set became the display device for the first recorded media for consumer use in the 1970s, such as Betamax and VHS; these were later succeeded by DVD. It has been used as a display device since the first generation of home computers (e.g., Timex Sinclair 1000) and dedicated video game consoles (e.g., Atari) in the 1980s. By the early 2010s, flat-panel television incorporating liquid-crystal display (LCD) technology, especially LED-backlit LCD technology, largely replaced CRT and other display technologies. Modern flat-panel TVs are typically capable of high-definition display (720p, 1080i, 1080p, 4K, 8K) and are capable of playing content from multiple sources, such as a USB device or internet streaming services.

== History ==
=== Early television ===
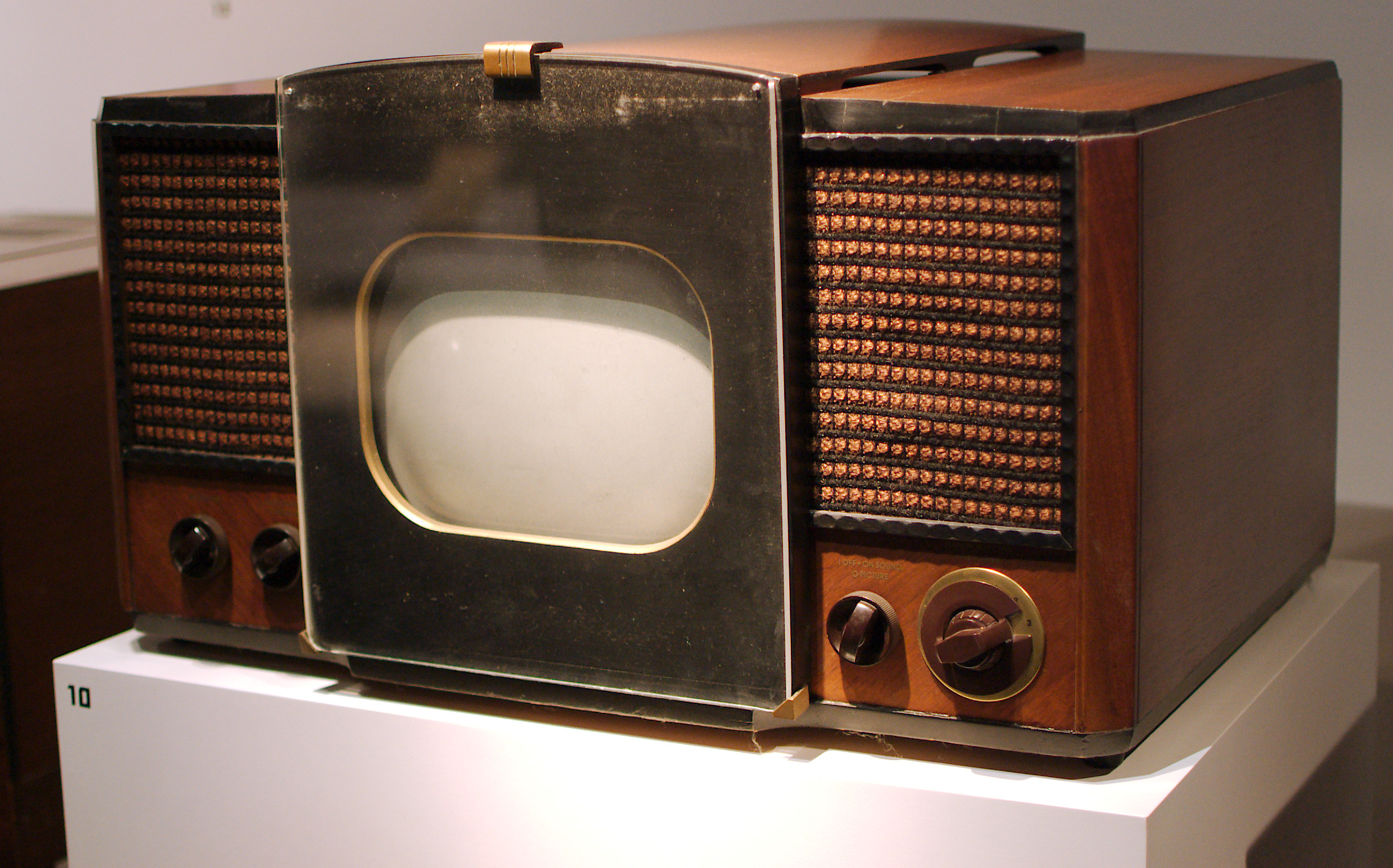
RCA 630-TS, the first mass-produced electronic television set, which sold in 1946–1947

Mechanical televisions were commercially sold from 1928 to 1934 in the United Kingdom, France, the United States, and the Soviet Union. The earliest commercially made televisions were radios with the addition of a television device consisting of a neon tube behind a mechanically spinning disk with a spiral of apertures that produced a red postage-stamp-sized image, enlarged to twice that size by a magnifying glass. The Baird "Televisor" (sold in 1930–1933 in the UK) is considered the first mass-produced television, selling about a thousand units.

Karl Ferdinand Braun was the first to conceive the use of a CRT as a display device in 1897. The "Braun tube" became the foundation of 20th century TV. In 1926, Kenjiro Takayanagi demonstrated the first TV system that employed a cathode ray tube (CRT) display, at Hamamatsu Industrial High School in Japan. This was the first working example of a fully electronic television receiver. His research toward creating a production model was halted by the US after Japan lost World War II.

The first commercially made electronic televisions with CRTs were manufactured by Telefunken in Germany in 1934, followed by other makers in France (1936), Britain (1936), and US (1938). The cheapest model with a 12-inch (30 cm) screen was $445 (equivalent to $10,178 in 2025). An estimated 19,000 electronic televisions were manufactured in Britain, and about 1,600 in Germany, before World War II. About 7,000–8,000 electronic sets were made in the U.S. before the War Production Board halted manufacture in April 1942, production resuming in August 1945. Television usage in the western world skyrocketed after World War II with the lifting of the manufacturing freeze, war-related technological advances, the drop in television prices caused by mass production, increased leisure time, and additional disposable income. While only 0.5% of U.S. households had a television in 1946, 55.7% had one in 1954, and 90% by 1962. In Britain, there were 15,000 television households in 1947, 1.4 million in 1952, and 15.1 million by 1968.

=== Transistorized television ===
Early electronic television sets were large and bulky, with analog circuits made of vacuum tubes. As an example, the RCA CT-100 color TV set used 36 vacuum tubes. Following the invention of the first working transistor at Bell Labs, Sony founder Masaru Ibuka predicted in 1952 that the transition to electronic circuits made of transistors would lead to smaller and more portable television sets. The first fully transistorized, portable solid-state television set was the 8-inch (20 cm) Sony TV8-301, developed in 1959 and released in 1960. By the 1970s, television manufacturers utilized this push for miniaturization to create small, console-styled sets which their salesmen could easily transport, pushing demand for television sets out into rural areas. However, the first fully transistorized color TV set, the HMV Colourmaster Model 2700, was released in 1967 by the British Radio Corporation. This began the transformation of television viewership from a communal viewing experience to a solitary viewing experience. By 1960, Sony had sold over 4 million portable television sets worldwide.

By the late 1960s and early 1970s, color television had come into wide use. In Britain, BBC1, BBC2 and ITV were regularly broadcasting in color by 1969.

Late model CRT TVs used highly integrated electronics such as a Jungle chip which performs the functions of many transistors. This shift began in the 1980s.

In the 1980s, with the advent of video in the form of VCRs, some TVs began to come with an RCA jack input for composite video input. These were typically high end TVs for the time, a notable example being the Sony ProFeel line, and were called video monitors, without necessarily having a built in TV tuner, and for the first time could have at least 2 video inputs. On-screen displays started to be introduced around this time. While in theory the dedicated composite input improved image quality by eliminating the need for an RF modulator connected to the antenna input when connecting devices such as VCRs and computers, there was no guarantee for higher image quality. The television stopped being used for broadcast television only, and molded plastic construction started to become common, closely surrounding the CRT tube inside, shifting away from cabinet (box-like, furniture-like) construction in which the CRT tube was mounted inside a wooden box. RF modulators were used to connect a video source such as a VCR or a video game console to the TV by modulating it into a TV channel such as channel 3 or 4.

=== LCD television ===
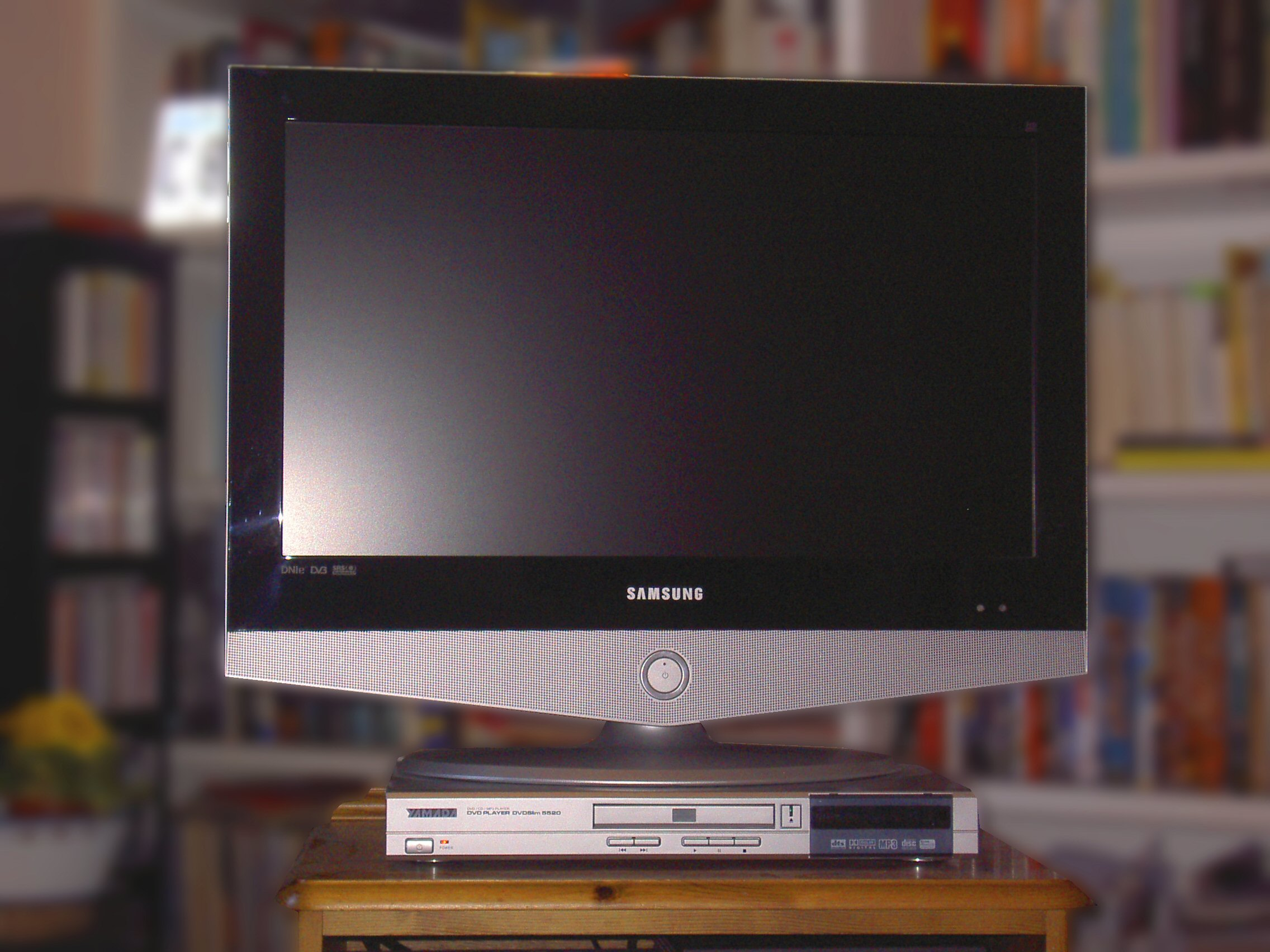
Samsung LE26R41BD (26 inch) widescreen LCD television and Yamada 5520 DVD player in 2003

Paul K. Weimer at RCA developed the thin-film transistor (TFT) in 1962, later the idea of a TFT-based liquid-crystal display (LCD) was conceived by Bernard Lechner of RCA Laboratories in 1968. Lechner, F. J. Marlowe, E. O. Nester and J. Tults demonstrated the concept in 1968 with a dynamic scattering LCD that used standard discrete MOSFETs.

In 1973, T. Peter Brody, J. A. Asars and G. D. Dixon at Westinghouse Research Laboratories demonstrated the first thin-film-transistor liquid-crystal display (TFT LCD). Brody and Fang-Chen Luo demonstrated the first flat active-matrix liquid-crystal display (AM LCD) in 1974.

By 1982, pocket LCD TVs based on AM LCD technology were developed in Japan. The 2.1-inch (5.3 cm) Epson ET-10 (Epson Elf) was the first color LCD pocket TV, released in 1984. In 1988, a Sharp research team led by engineer T. Nagayasu demonstrated a 14-inch (36 cm) full-color LCD, which convinced the electronics industry that LCD would eventually replace the CRT as the standard television display technology. The first wall-mountable TV was introduced by Sharp in 1992.

During the first decade of the 21st century, CRT "picture tube" display technology was almost entirely supplanted worldwide by flat-panel displays: first plasma displays around 1997, then LCDs. By the early 2010s, LCD TVs, which increasingly used LED-backlit LCDs, accounted for the overwhelming majority of television sets being manufactured.

In 2014, Curved OLED TVs were released to the market, which were intended to offer improved image quality but this effect was only visible at a certain position away from the TV.

Rollable OLED TVs were introduced in 2020, which allow the display panel of the TV to be hidden.

2023 saw the release of wireless TVs which connect to other devices solely through a transmitter box with an antenna that transmits information wirelessly to the TV. Demos of transparent TVs have also been made. There are TVs that are offered to users for free, but are paid for by showing ads to users and collecting user data.

=== TV sizes ===
Cambridge's Clive Sinclair created a mini TV in 1967 that could be held in the palm of a hand and was the world's smallest television at the time, though it never took off commercially because the design was complex. In 2019, Samsung launched the largest television to date at 292 inches (742 cm; 24 ft). The average size of TVs has grown over time.

In 2024, the sales of large-screen televisions significantly increased. Between January and September, approximately 38,000 televisions with a screen size of 97 inches (250 cm) or larger were sold globally. This surge in popularity can be attributed to several factors, including technological advancements and decreasing prices.

The availability of larger screen sizes at more affordable prices has driven consumer demand. For example, Samsung, a leading electronics manufacturer, introduced its first 98-inch (250 cm) television in 2019 with a price tag of $99,000. In 2024, the company will offer four 98-inch (250 cm) models starting at $4,000. This trend is reflected in the overall market, with the average price of a television exceeding 97 inches (250 cm), declining from $6,662 in 2023 to $3,113 in 2024. As technology advances, even larger screen sizes, such as 110 and 115 inches (280 and 290 cm), are becoming increasingly accessible to consumers.

=== Television processors ===
Since the early 2020s, television manufacturers have incorporated dedicated processors handling upscaling, color processing, tone mapping, and noise reduction, increasingly emphasizing neural processing units (NPUs). Independent reviewers note that year-over-year improvements are typically incremental, and that display panel hardware contributes as significantly to picture quality as the processor.

In 2021, Sony introduced the Cognitive Processor XR, which analyzes multiple picture elements to identify scene content and focal points. LG Electronics markets processors under the Alpha brand; its 2026 Alpha 11 AI Processor 4K Gen 3 incorporates a Dual AI Engine and uses 6-nanometer technology with reported 50% CPU and 5.6× neural processing improvements compared to its Alpha 9 Gen 8.

TCL Electronics and Hisense employ competing LED backlighting approaches. Independent testing has not established clear superiority among these backlighting technologies; picture quality varies more substantially based on dimming zone count and algorithm implementation. Manufacturer processor specifications typically increase numerically each year, though independent reviewers note these figures do not directly correlate with subjective picture quality improvements.

== Display ==
Television sets may employ one of several available display technologies. As of mid-2019, LCDs overwhelmingly predominate in new merchandise, but OLED displays are claiming an increasing market share as they become more affordable and DLP technology continues to offer some advantages in projection systems. The production of plasma and CRT displays has been completely discontinued.

There are four primary competing TV technologies:

- CRT
- LCD (multiple variations of LCD screens are called QLED, quantum dot, LED, LCD TN, LCD IPS, LCD PLS, LCD VA, etc.)
- OLED
- Plasma

=== CRT ===
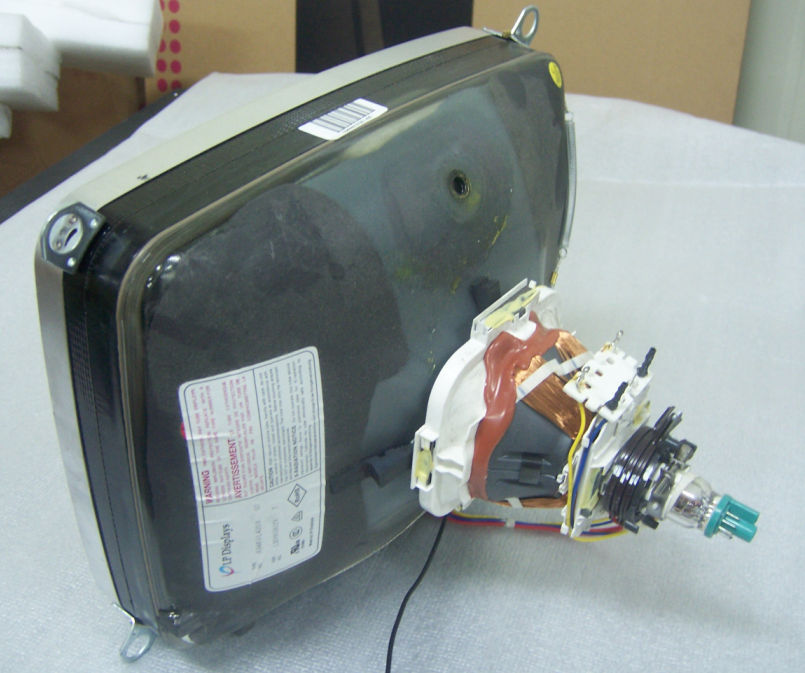
A 14-inch (36 cm) cathode ray tube showing its deflection coils and electron guns

The cathode ray tube (CRT) is a vacuum tube containing a so-called electron gun (or three for a color television) and a fluorescent screen where the television image is displayed. The electron gun accelerates electrons in a beam which is deflected in both the vertical and horizontal directions using varying electric or (usually, in television sets) magnetic fields, in order to scan a raster image onto the fluorescent screen. The CRT requires an evacuated glass envelope, which is rather deep (well over half of the screen size), fairly heavy, and breakable. As a matter of radiation safety, both the face (panel) and back (funnel) were made of thick lead glass in order to reduce human exposure to harmful ionizing radiation (in the form of x-rays) produced when electrons accelerated using a high voltage (10–30 kV) strike the screen. By the early 1970s, most color TVs replaced leaded glass in the face panel with vitrified strontium oxide glass, which also blocked x-ray emissions but allowed better color visibility. This also eliminated the need for cadmium phosphors in earlier color televisions. Leaded glass, which is less expensive, continued to be used in the funnel glass, which is not visible to the consumer.

In television sets (and most computer monitors that use CRTs), the entire screen area is scanned repetitively (completing a full frame 25 or 30 times a second) in a fixed pattern called a raster. The image information is received in real time from a video signal which controls the electric current supplying the electron gun, or, in color televisions, each of the three electron guns whose beams land on phosphors of the three primary colors (red, green, and blue). Except in the very early days of television, magnetic deflection has been used to scan the image onto the face of the CRT; this involves a varying current applied to both the vertical and horizontal deflection coils placed around the neck of the tube just beyond the electron gun(s).

=== DLP ===
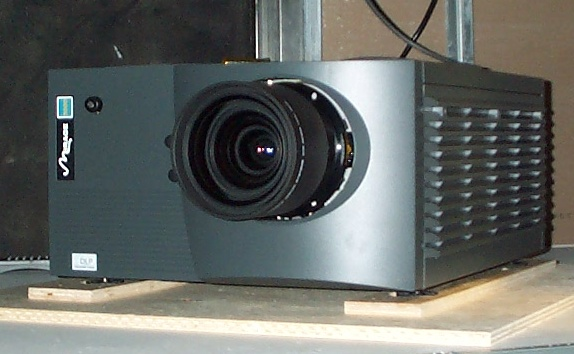
The Christie Mirage 5000, a 2001 DLP projector

Digital light processing (DLP) is a type of video projector technology that uses a digital micromirror device. Some DLPs have a TV tuner, which makes them a type of TV display. It was originally developed in 1987 by Larry Hornbeck of Texas Instruments. While the DLP imaging device was invented by Texas Instruments, the first DLP-based projector was introduced by Digital Projection Ltd in 1997. Digital Projection and Texas Instruments were both awarded Emmy Awards in 1998 for the DLP projector technology. DLP is used in a variety of display applications from traditional static displays to interactive displays and also non-traditional embedded applications including medical, security, and industrial uses.

DLP technology is used in DLP front projectors (standalone projection units for classrooms and business primarily), DLP rear projection television sets, and digital signs. It is also used in about 85% of digital cinema projection, and in additive manufacturing as a power source in some SLA 3D printers to cure resins into solid 3D objects.

=== Rear projection ===
Rear-projection televisions (RPTVs) became very popular in the early days of television, when the ability to practically produce tubes with a large display size did not exist. In 1936, for a tube capable of being mounted horizontally in the television cabinet, nine inches (23 cm) would have been regarded as the largest convenient size that could be made owing to its required length, due to the low deflection angles of CRTs produced in the era, which meant that CRTs with large front sizes would have also needed to be very deep, which caused such CRTs to be installed at an angle to reduce the cabinet depth of the TV set. Twelve inches (30 cm) tubes and TV sets were available, but the tubes were so long (deep) that they were mounted vertically and viewed via a mirror in the top of the TV set cabinet which was usually mounted under a hinged lid, reducing considerably the depth of the set but making it taller. These mirror lid televisions were large pieces of furniture.

As a solution, Philips introduced a television set in 1937 that relied on back projecting an image from a 4 1/2-inch (11 cm) tube onto a 25-inch (64 cm) screen. This required the tube to be driven very hard (at unusually high voltages and currents; see Cathode ray tube § Projection CRTs) to produce an extremely bright image on its fluorescent screen. Further, Philips decided to use a green phosphor on the tube face as it was brighter than the white phosphors of the day. In fact these early tubes were not up to the job and by November of that year Philips decided that it was cheaper to buy the sets back than to provide replacement tubes under warranty every couple of weeks or so. Substantial improvements were very quickly made to these small tubes and a more satisfactory tube design was available the following year helped by Philips's decision to use a smaller screen size of 23-inch (58 cm). In 1950 a more efficient 2 1/2-inch (6.4 cm) tube with vastly improved technology and more efficient white phosphor, along with smaller and less demanding screen sizes, was able to provide an acceptable image, though the life of the tubes was still shorter than contemporary direct view tubes. As CRT technology improved during the 1950s, producing larger and larger screen sizes and later on, (more or less) rectangular tubes, the rear projection system was obsolete before the end of the decade.

However, in the early to mid-2000s, RPTV systems made a comeback as a cheaper alternative to contemporary LCD and plasma TVs. They were larger and lighter than contemporary CRT TVs and had a flat screen just like LCD and Plasma, but unlike LCD and Plasma, RPTVs were often dimmer, had lower contrast ratios and viewing angles, image quality was affected by room lighting and suffered when compared with direct-view CRTs, and were still bulky like CRTs. These TVs worked by having a DLP, LCoS or LCD projector at the bottom of the unit, and using a mirror to project the image onto a screen. The screen may be a Fresnel lens to increase brightness at the cost of viewing angles. Some early units used CRT projectors and were heavy, weighing up to 500 pounds. Most RPTVs used Ultra-high-performance lamps as their light source, which required periodic replacement partly because they dimmed with use but mainly because the operating bulb glass became weaker with ageing to the point where the bulb could eventually shatter, often damaging the projection system. Those that used CRTs and lasers did not require replacement.

=== Plasma ===
A plasma display panel (PDP) is a type of flat-panel display common to large TV displays 30 inches (76 cm) or larger. They are called "plasma" displays because the technology utilizes small cells containing electrically charged ionized gases, or what are in essence chambers more commonly known as fluorescent lamps. Around 2014, television manufacturers were largely phasing out plasma TVs, because a plasma TV became higher cost and more difficult to make in 4k compared to LED or LCD.

In 1997, Philips introduced at CES and CeBIT the first large (42-inch or 110-centimetre) commercially available flat-panel TV, using Fujitsu plasma displays.

=== LCD ===
A generic LCD TV, with speakers on either side of the screen

Liquid-crystal-display televisions (LCD TV) are television sets that use liquid-crystal displays to produce images. LCD televisions are much thinner and lighter than CRTs of similar display size and are available in much larger sizes (e.g., 90-inch or 230-centimetre diagonal). When manufacturing costs fell, this combination of features made LCDs practical for television receivers.

In 2007, LCD televisions surpassed sales of CRT-based televisions globally for the first time, and their sales figures relative to other technologies accelerated. LCD TVs quickly displaced the only major competitors in the large-screen market, the plasma display panel and rear-projection television. In the mid-2010s LCDs became, by far, the most widely produced and sold television display type.

LCDs also have disadvantages. Other technologies address these weaknesses, including OLEDs, FED and SED. LCDs can have quantum dots and mini-LED backlights to enhance image quality.

=== OLED ===
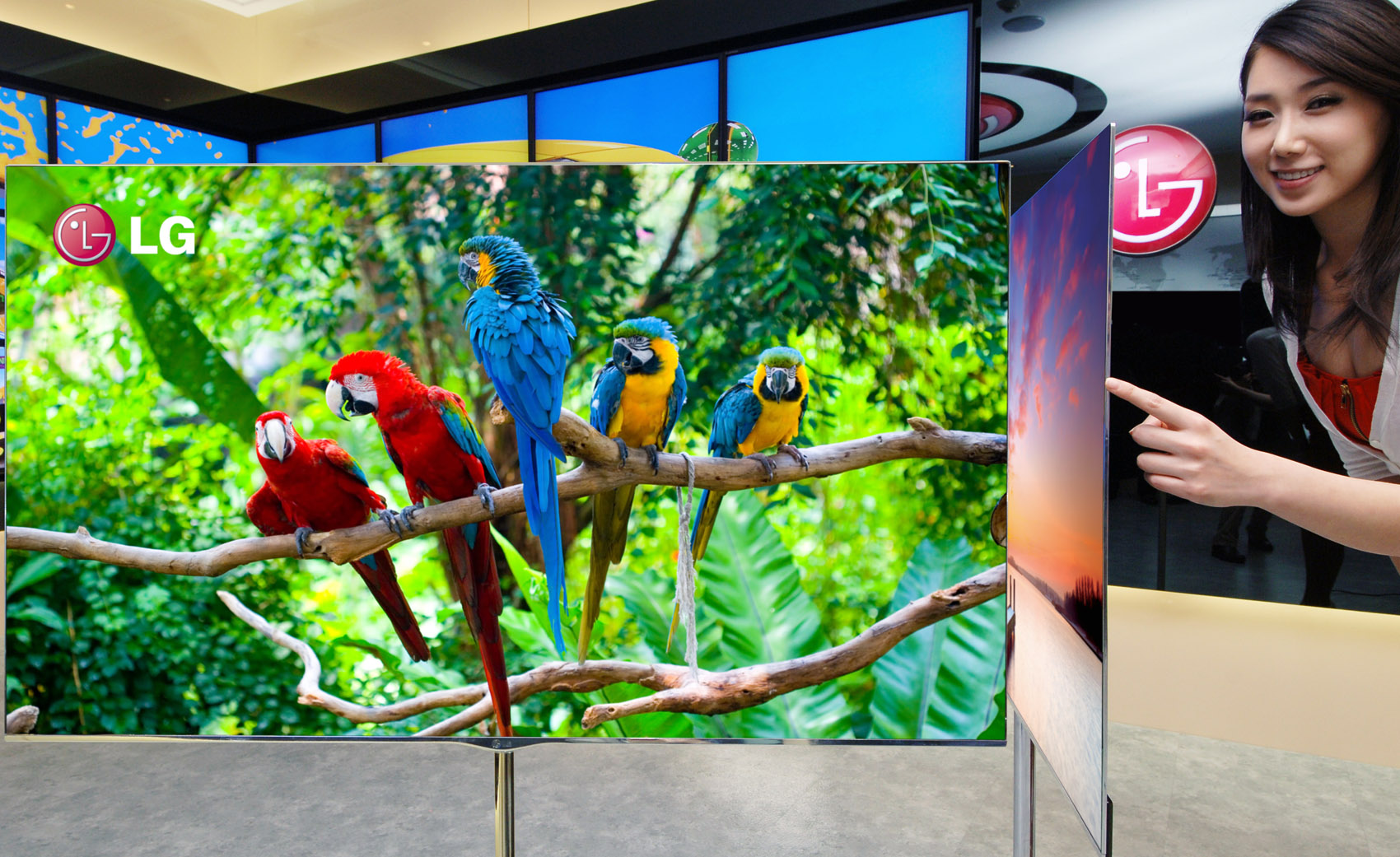
An OLED TV

An OLED (organic light-emitting diode) is a light-emitting diode (LED) in which the emissive electroluminescent layer is a film of organic compound which emits light in response to an electric current. This layer of organic semiconductor is situated between two electrodes. Generally, at least one of these electrodes is transparent. OLEDs are used to create digital displays in devices such as television screens. It is also used for computer monitors, portable systems such as mobile phones, handheld game consoles and PDAs.

There are two main families of OLED: those based on small molecules and those employing polymers. Adding mobile ions to an OLED creates a light-emitting electrochemical cell or LEC, which has a slightly different mode of operation. OLED displays can use either passive-matrix (PMOLED) or active-matrix addressing schemes. Active-matrix OLEDs (AMOLED) require a thin-film transistor backplane to switch each individual pixel on or off, but allow for higher resolution and larger display sizes.

An OLED display works without a backlight. Thus, it can display deep black levels and can be thinner and lighter than a liquid crystal display (LCD). In low ambient light conditions such as a dark room, an OLED screen can achieve a higher contrast ratio than an LCD, whether the LCD uses cold cathode fluorescent lamps or LED backlight.

== Television types ==
While most televisions are designed for consumers in the household, there are several markets that demand variations, including hospitality, healthcare, and other commercial settings.

=== Hospitality television ===
Televisions made for the hospitality industry are part of an establishment's internal television system designed to be used by its guests. Therefore, settings menus are hidden and locked by a password. Other common software features include volume limiting, customizable power-on splash image, and channel hiding. These TVs are typically controlled by a set-back box using one of the data ports on the rear of the TV. The set-back box may offer channel lists, pay per view, video on demand, and casting from a smartphone or tablet.

Hospitality spaces are insecure with respect to content piracy, so many content providers require the use of digital rights management. Hospitality TVs decrypt the industry-standard Pro:Idiom when no set-top box is used. While H.264 is not part of the ATSC 1.0 standard in North America, TV content in hospitality can include H.264 encoded video, so hospitality TVs include H.264 decoding. Managing dozens or hundreds of TVs can be time consuming, so hospitality TVs can be cloned by storing settings on a USB drive and restoring those settings quickly. Additionally, server-based and cloud-based management systems can monitor and configure an entire fleet of TVs.

=== Healthcare television ===
Healthcare televisions include the provisions of hospitality TVs with additional features for usability and safety. They are designed for use in a healthcare setting in which the user may have limited mobility and audio/visual impairment. A key feature is the pillow speaker connection. Pillow speakers combine nurse call functions, TV remote control and a speaker for audio. In multiple occupancy rooms where several TVs are used in close proximity, the televisions can be programmed to respond to a remote control with unique codes so that each remote only controls one TV. Smaller TVs, also called bedside infotainment systems, have a full-function keypad below the screen. This allows direct interaction without the use of a pillow speaker or remote. These TVs typically have antimicrobial surfaces and can withstand daily cleaning using disinfectants. In the US, the UL safety standard for televisions, UL 62368-1, contains a special section (annex DVB) which outlines additional safety requirements for televisions used in healthcare.

=== Outdoor television ===
Outdoor television sets are designed for outdoor use and are usually found in the outdoor sections of bars, sports fields, or other community facilities. Most outdoor televisions use high-definition television technology. Their bodies are more robust. The screens are designed to remain clearly visible even in sunny outdoor lighting. The screens also have anti-reflective coatings to prevent glare. They are weather-resistant and often also have anti-theft brackets. Outdoor TV models can also be connected with Blu-ray players and PVRs for greater functionality.

== Replacing ==
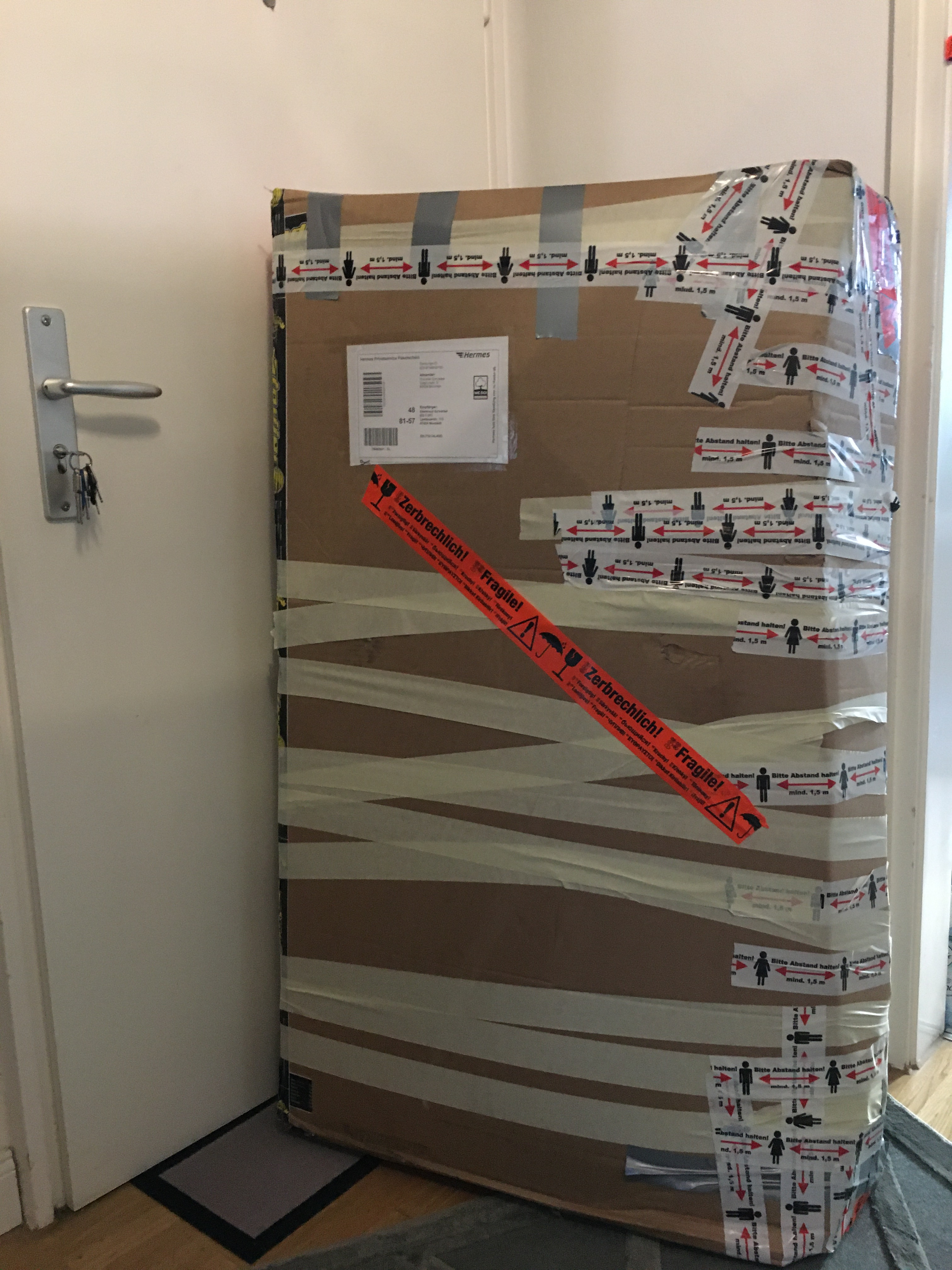
46-inch (120 cm) LCD television set in a cardboard box 120 cm × 70 cm × 25 cm (47 in × 28 in × 10 in) (height, width and depth). Such packages are difficult to handle and expensive to send via commercial carriers, which renders the selling of used TVs cumbersome.

In the United States, the average consumer replaces their television every 6.9 years, but research suggests that due to advanced software and apps, the replacement cycle may be shortening.

== Recycling and disposal ==
Due to recent changes in electronic waste legislation, economical and environmentally friendly television disposal has become increasingly available in the form of television recycling. Challenges with recycling television sets include proper HAZMAT disposal, landfill pollution, and illegal international trade.

== Major manufacturers ==
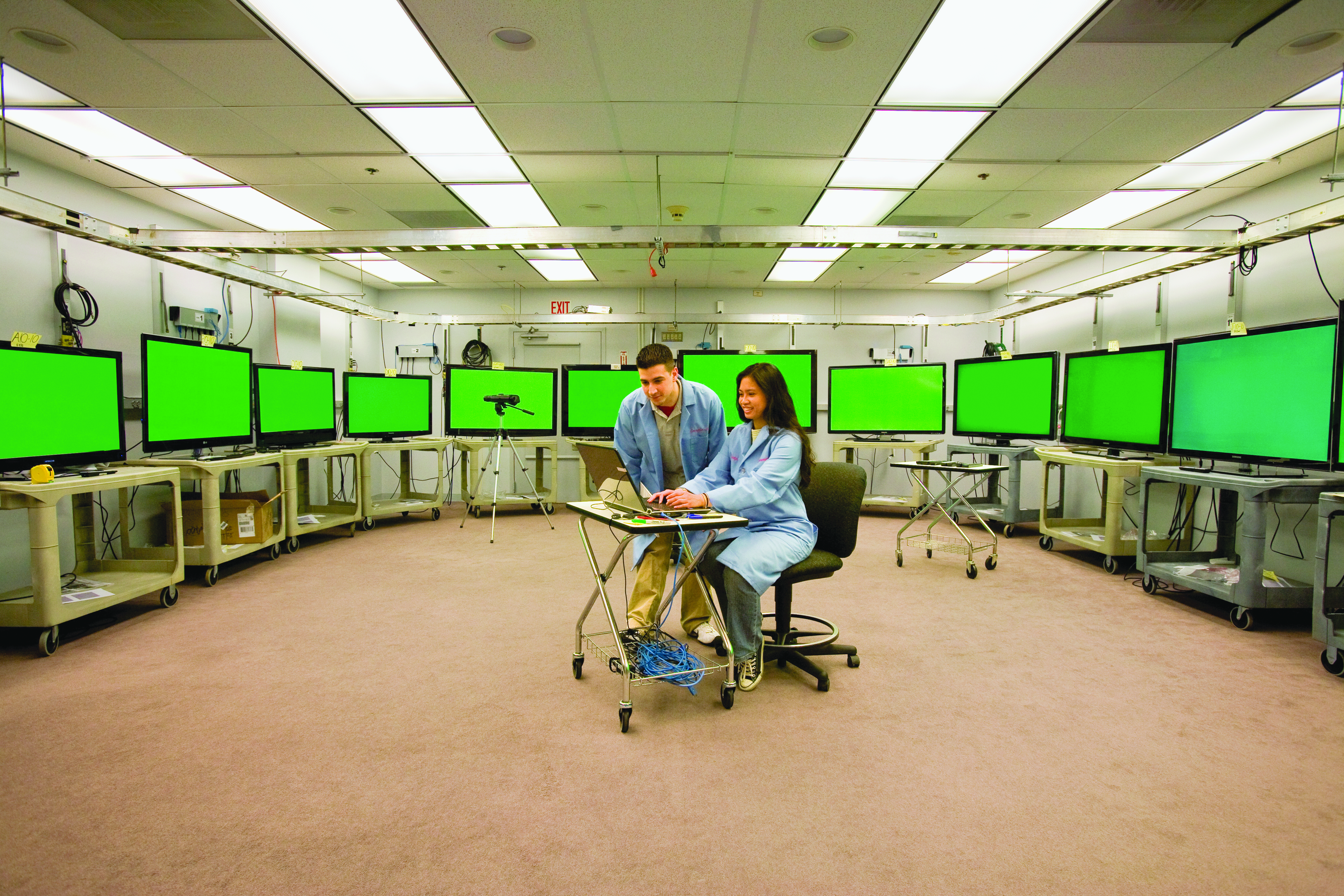
Consumer Reports product testing, with LCD and plasma television sets

Global 2016 years statistics for LCD TV.

Rank	Manufacturer		Market share (%)	Headquarters
1	(South Korea)	Samsung Electronics	20.2	Suwon, South Korea
2	(South Korea)	LG Electronics	12.1	Seoul, South Korea
3	(China)	TCL Technology	9	Huizhou, China
4	(China)	Hisense	6.1	Qingdao, China
5	(Japan)	Sony	5.6	Tokyo, Japan
7	(China)	Skyworth	3.8	Shenzhen, China
8	(Hong Kong)	TPV Technology (Philips)	3.8	Hong Kong, China
9	(United States)	Vizio	3.7	Irvine, California, United States
10	(China)	Changhong	3.2	Mianyang, China
11	(China)	Haier	3	Qingdao, China
12		Others	27.2	

== See also ==
- 3D television
- Active antenna
- Color killer
- Color television
- Digital video recorder
- Digital television transition
- Handheld television
- Home cinema
- Large-screen television technology
- Mirror TV
- Multiplier
- Smart TV
- TV aerial plug
- Viera Cast
