= Set-back box =

Broadcast and internet-based video content receiver

The term set-back box (SBB) is used in the digital TV industry to describe a piece of consumer hardware that enables them to access both linear broadcast and internet-based video content, plus a range of interactive services like electronic program guides, pay-per-view, and video on demand as well as internet browsing, and view them on a large screen television set. Unlike standard set-top boxes, which sit on top or below the TV set, a set-back box has a smaller form factor to enable it to be mounted to the rear of the flat panel TV, hiding it from view.

To date, set-back boxes have been mainly focused on the cable industry, having been rolled out in four major cable markets in the United States. As of February 2010, these devices are available in both standard-definition and high-definition versions, provide a DOCSIS 2.0 high speed return channel, and are able to receive transmissions in all industry standard compression formats, including MPEG-2, MPEG-4/H.264 and SMPTE-421M/VC-. This enables broadcasters to maximise their broadcast bandwidth while creating a new consumer TV experience.

In October 2009 the ADB-4820C set-back box was voted the TV Innovation of the Year, by a panel of independent industry experts, overseen by IMS Research at the TV 3.0 Conference in Denver, Colorado, United States of America. The ADB set-back box was the first to use the latest HDMI-CEC technology, enabling a single remote control to be used for both the TV and set-back box and is tru2way compliant.
