= Ubee Interactive =

- Company type: Incorporated
- Industry: Telecommunications
- Founded: 1991
- Headquarters: Zhubei, Hsinchu County, Taiwan
- Key people: Yuan-Hao Lin, CEO
- Products: Modems, Routers
- Website: www.ubeeinteractive.com

Ubee Interactive manufactures and engineers fixed and mobile broadband customer premises equipment (CPE) for worldwide cable and telecommunications service providers. These service providers, also known as multiple system operators (MSOs), provision Ubee CPEs to their residential and commercial subscribers enabling broadband services such as data, voice, and video entertainment. Ubee's products include cable data modems, telephony (VoIP) and IPTV gateways, Wi-Fi gateways, and other mobile devices. As an early adopter of the DOCSIS standard in their equipment, Ubee became a major catalyst in the proliferation of this standard throughout the cable telecommunications industry.

Ubee has deployed over 40 million devices worldwide and is supported by offices in:

Europe: Amsterdam (The Netherlands)
Asia: Hsinchu, Taiwan
The Americas: Englewood, Colorado (USA)

Ubee Interactive was formerly known as Ambit Microsystems until renamed in March 2009.
