= Advanced Digital Broadcast =

Company which provides software and services to telecommunication operators

ADB
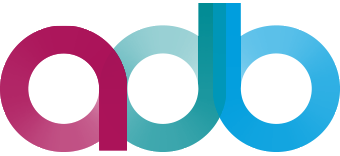
- Type: Private
- Industry: Television, Telecommunications, Pay-TV, Broadband
- Founder: Andrew Rybicki, Janusz C. Szajna, Krzysztof Kolbuszewski, Mariusz Walkowiak
- Headquarters: Bellevue (GE), Switzerland
- Key people: Andrew Rybicki, chairman
- Products: Set-top boxes Digital Video Recorders; Interactive television Compact Television head-ends Residential Gateways, Home Networking, TR-069 Remote Management, Mesh Technology; Wi-Fi 6
- Number of employees: 250

Advanced Digital Broadcast (ADB) is a company that provides software, system and services to pay-TV and telecommunication operators, content distributors, and property owners. The company specializes also in the development of digital connectivity devices such as set-top boxes and residential gateways.

ADB's global headquarters are located in Bellevue, Switzerland. The company has research and development facilities in Poland and Italy and an Operations division in Taipei, Taiwan. ADB has local offices in several countries in Europe and the United States.

Founded in 1995, ADB initially focused on developing and marketing software for digital TV processors and expanded its business to the design and manufacture of digital TV equipment in 1997. The company sold its first set-top box in 1997 and since then has been delivering a number of set-top boxes, and residential gateways, together with advanced software platforms. ADB has sold over 64 million devices worldwide to cable, satellite, IPTV and broadband operators. ADB employs over 350 people, of which 70% are in engineering functions.

== History ==
In 1995, ADB was founded by Andrew Rybicki, Janusz C. Szajna, Krzysztof Kolbuszewski, Mariusz Walkowiak, and Stanley Hemphill with an initial focus on developing and marketing software for advanced digital TV processors.

In 1997, ADB started designing and manufacturing of digital TV equipment. ADB designed its first commercial set-to box, and established its dedicated R&D facility in Poland and corporate headquarters in Taiwan.

Between 1998 and 2000 offices were opened in Australia, and Spain, and ADB sold its one millionth set-top box.

In 2001, ADB announced the development of an open standard set-top box middleware based on the Multimedia Home Platform (MHP) specification and established its worldwide headquarters in Geneva, Switzerland.

In 2002, the company opened its Americas headquarters in Chicago (which has since moved to Denver). and became the world's first set-top box provider to launch an MHP digital receiver, the i-CAN 3000, in Finland.

In 2003, ADB delivered set-top boxes for the launch of digital terrestrial TV services in Italy, announced the world's first hybrid MHP Internet set-top box with terrestrial reception and became the first company to supply the television industry with MHP-compliant set-top boxes. The company received a German-Polish Innovation Award and a Cable & Satellite International (CSI) Product of the Year award for its i-CAN 3000 set-top box.

In 2005, ADB Group was floated on the Swiss Stock Exchange (SWX) and ADB secured its first major IPTV contract to supply set-top boxes to Telefónica in Spain. The company unveiled its first single-chip MPEG-4 AVC based set-top box, the ADB-7800TW. In the same year ADB established new R&D Centre in Kharkiv, Ukraine.

In 2006 ADB introduced European-based manufacturing and shipped its eight millionth set-top box. The company partnered with UK broadcasters the BBC, Channel 4, Five and ITV.in for the first HDTV field trial on the UK's digital terrestrial network. This year ADB participated also in a pilot with Italian broadcaster RAI for the world's first HDTV transmission using MPEG-4 AVC video compression during coverage of the Winter Olympics from Turin, Italy.

In 2007, ADB deployed first IPTV STB on North American Telco Network

In 2008, ADB deployed its 12 millionth set-top box and introduced tru2way certified set-top boxes for the interactive cable TV market. The same year, ADB received Product of the Year award by IBC and IPTV World Series Awards.

In 2009, ADB was announced TV Innovator of the Year & Best set-top box technology provider by IMS RESEARCH

In 2010, ADB Group acquired Pirelli Broadband Solutions, thus entering the broadband market. In the same year ADB became Indonesia's first HD interactive set-top solution provider. ADB received 2 Product of the Year awards by CSI at IBC.

In 2015, ADB rebranded, changed the company logo and published a combined offer to acquire all publicly held shares of the company, becoming a privately held company.

In 2016, ADB's personal TV platform graphyne2 won the Best of Show 2016 award and CSI Award for Best interactive TV technology or application during IBC in Amsterdam.

In 2018, ADB implements Wi-Fi Mesh Technology to the company's portfolio.

In 2021, ADB introduces a premium fiber optic access gateway with Wi-Fi 6 to the company's product portfolio.

== Products ==
ADB is a global supplier of set-top boxes and residential gateways to cable, satellite, IP, terrestrial television operators, and broadband service providers. The company sells software for advanced pay-TV services, such as catch-up, start-over, multi-room video recording, VOD, interactive TV and internet applications, consumer devices, middleware, applications, head ends; broadband access gateways and home networking devices; remote management software; and life-cycle and integration services.
