= Set-top box =

Device to create output for a television

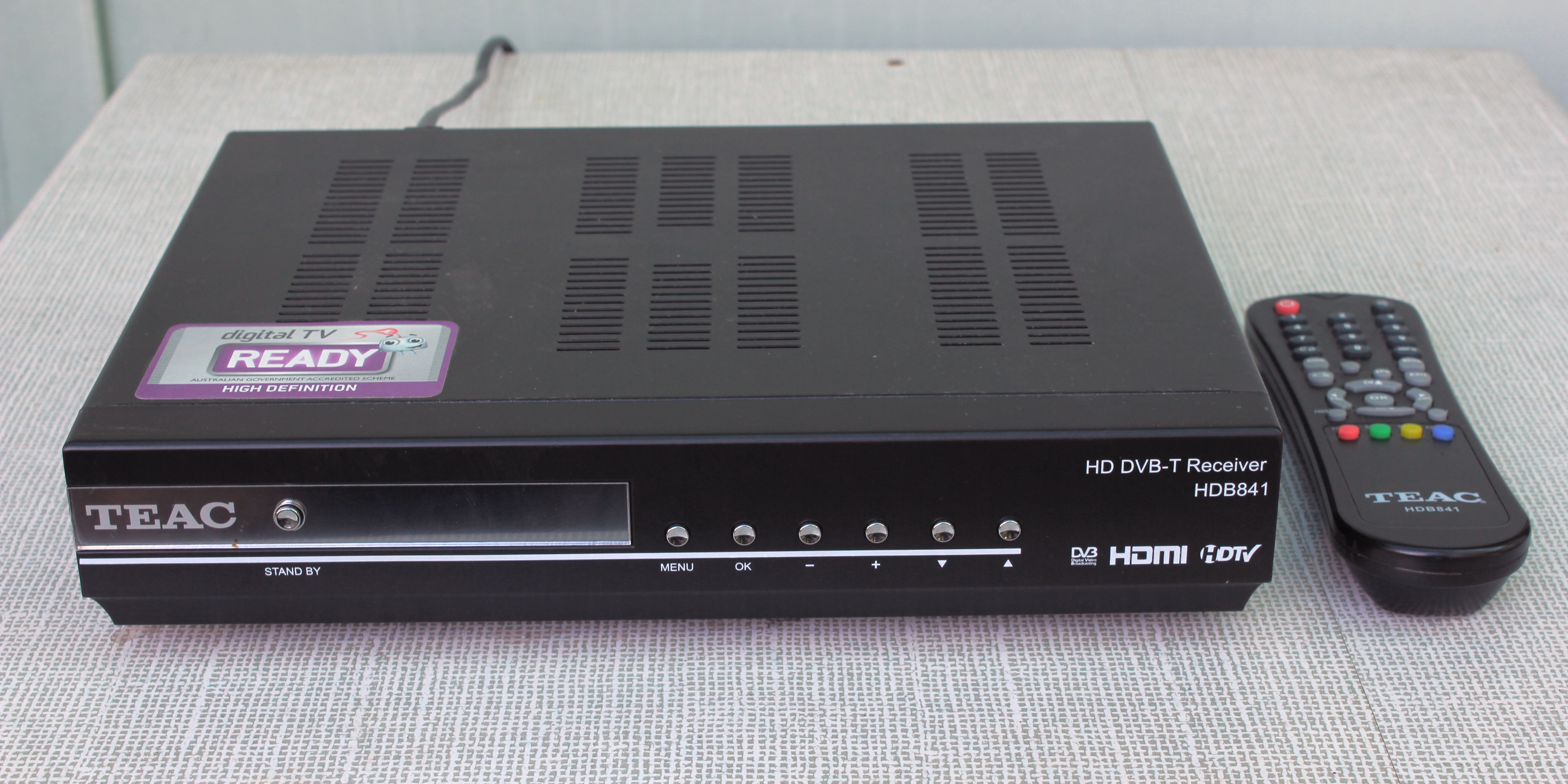
A typical modern set-top box, along with its remote control - pictured here a digital terrestrial TV receiver by TEAC

A set-top box (STB), also known as a cable box, receiver, or simply box, and historically television decoder or a converter, is an information appliance device that generally contains a TV tuner input and displays output to a television set, turning the source signal into content in a form that can then be displayed on the television screen or other display device. It is designed to be placed alongside or "on top" (hence the name) of a television set.

Set-top boxes are used in cable television, satellite television, terrestrial television and Internet Protocol television systems, as well as other uses such as digital media players ("streaming boxes"). Alternatives to set-top boxes are the smaller dongles, and television sets with built-in TV tuners.

== TV signal sources ==
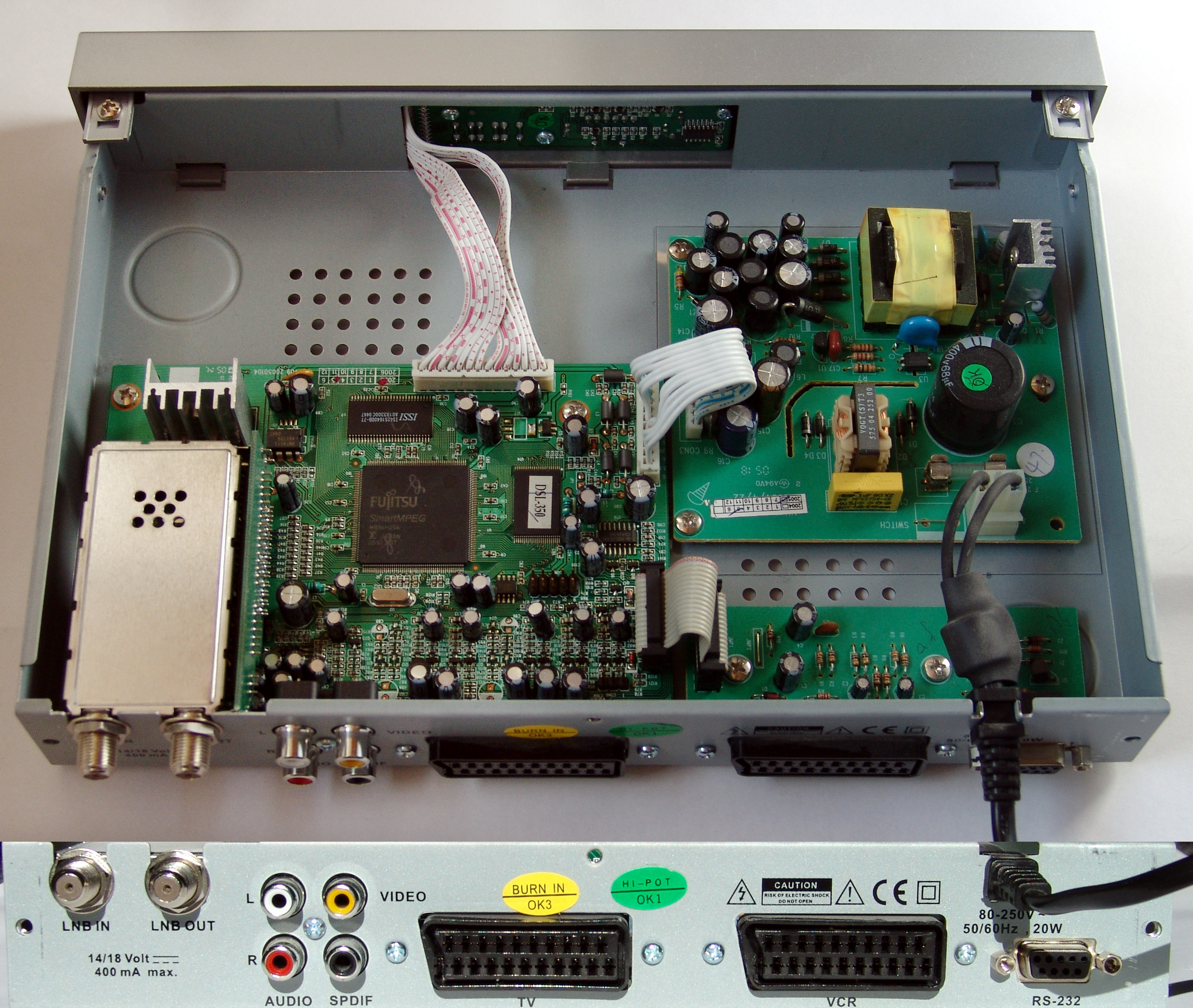
A consumer Palcom DSL-350 satellite-receiver; the IF demodulation tuner is on the bottom left, and a Fujitsu MPEG decoder CPU is in the center of the board. The power supply is on the right.

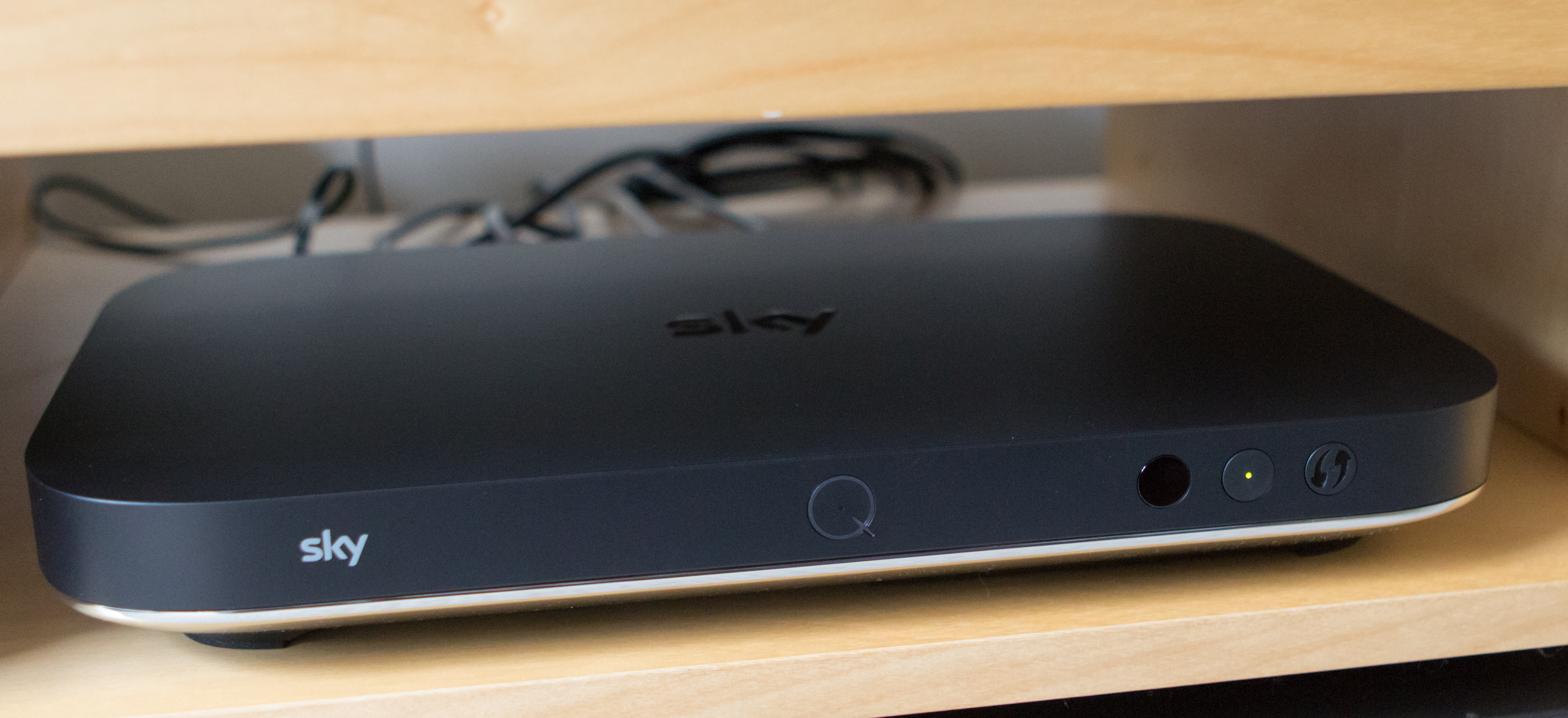
A Sky Q digital satellite receiver set-top box

The signal source might be an Ethernet cable, a satellite dish, a coaxial cable (see cable television), a telephone line (including DSL connections), broadband over power lines (BPL), or even an ordinary VHF or UHF antenna. Content, in this context, could mean any or all of video, audio, Internet web pages, interactive video games, or other possibilities. Satellite and microwave-based services also require specific external receiver hardware, so the use of set-top boxes of various formats has never completely disappeared. Set-top boxes can also enhance source signal quality.

=== UHF converter ===
Before the All-Channel Receiver Act of 1962 required US television receivers to be able to tune the entire VHF and UHF range (which in North America was NTSC-M channels 2 through 83 on 54 to 890 MHz), a set-top box known as a UHF converter would be installed at the receiver to shift a portion of the UHF-TV spectrum onto low-VHF channels for viewing. As some 1960s-era 12-channel TV sets remained in use for many years, and Canada and Mexico were slower than the US to require UHF tuners to be factory-installed in new TVs, a market for these converters continued to exist for much of the 1970s.

=== Cable converter ===
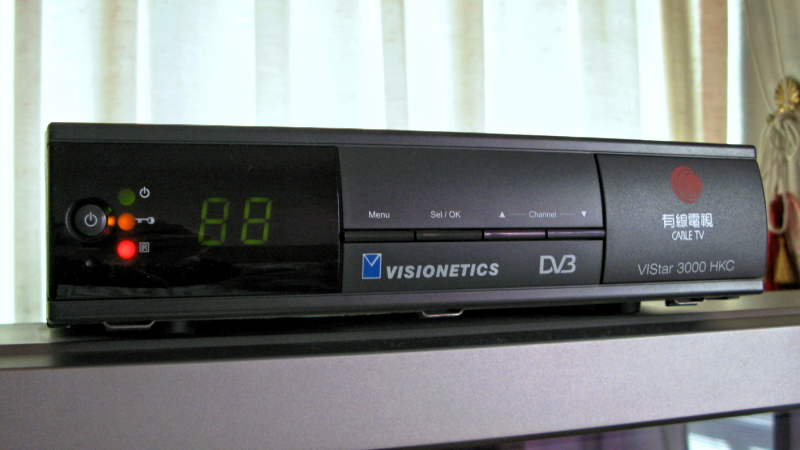
An older digital cable TV set-top box

Cable television represented a possible alternative to deployment of UHF converters as broadcasts could be frequency-shifted to VHF channels at the cable head-end instead of the final viewing location. However, most cable systems could not accommodate the full 54-to-890 MHz VHF/UHF frequency range and the twelve channels of VHF space were quickly exhausted on most systems. Adding any additional channels therefore needed to be done by inserting the extra signals into cable systems on nonstandard frequencies, typically either below VHF channel 7 (midband) or directly above VHF channel 13 (superband).

These frequencies corresponded to non-television services (such as two-way radio) over the air and were therefore not on standard TV receivers. Before cable-ready TV sets became common in the late 1980s, an electronic tuning device called a cable converter box was needed to receive the additional analogue cable TV channels and transpose or convert the selected channel to analogue radio frequency (RF) for viewing on a regular TV set on a single channel, usually VHF channel 3 or 4. The box allowed an analogue non–cable-ready television set to receive analogue encrypted cable channels and was a prototype topology for later date digital encryption devices. Newer televisions were then converted to be analogue cypher cable-ready, with the standard converter built-in for selling premium television (a.k.a. pay-per-view). Several years later and slowly marketed, the advent of digital cable continued and increased the need for various forms of these devices. Block conversion of the entire affected frequency band onto UHF, while less common, was used by some models to provide full VCR compatibility and the ability to drive multiple TV sets, albeit with a somewhat nonstandard channel numbering scheme.

Newer television receivers greatly reduced the need for external set-top boxes, although cable converter boxes continue to be used to descramble premium cable channels according to carrier-controlled access restrictions, and to receive digital cable channels, along with using interactive services like video on demand, pay per view, and home shopping through television.

=== Closed captioning box ===
Set-top boxes were also made to enable closed captioning on older sets in North America, before this became a mandated inclusion in new television sets. Some have also been produced to mute the audio (or replace it with noise) when profanity is detected in the captioning, where the offensive word is also blocked. Some also include a V-chip that allows only programs of some television content rating systems. A function that limits children's time watching TV or playing video games may also be built in, though some work on main electricity rather than the video signal.

=== Digital television adapter ===
The transition to digital terrestrial television after the turn of the millennium left many existing television receivers unable to tune and display the new signal directly. In the United States, where the analogue shutdown was completed in 2009 for full-service broadcasters, a federal subsidy was offered for coupon-eligible converter boxes with deliberately limited capability which would restore signals lost to digital transition.

=== Professional set-top box ===
Professional set-top boxes are referred to as IRDs or integrated receiver/decoders in the professional broadcast audio/video industry. They are designed for more robust field handling and rack mounting environments. IRDs are capable of outputting uncompressed serial digital interface signals, unlike consumer STBs which usually do not, mostly because of copyright reasons.

=== Hybrid box ===
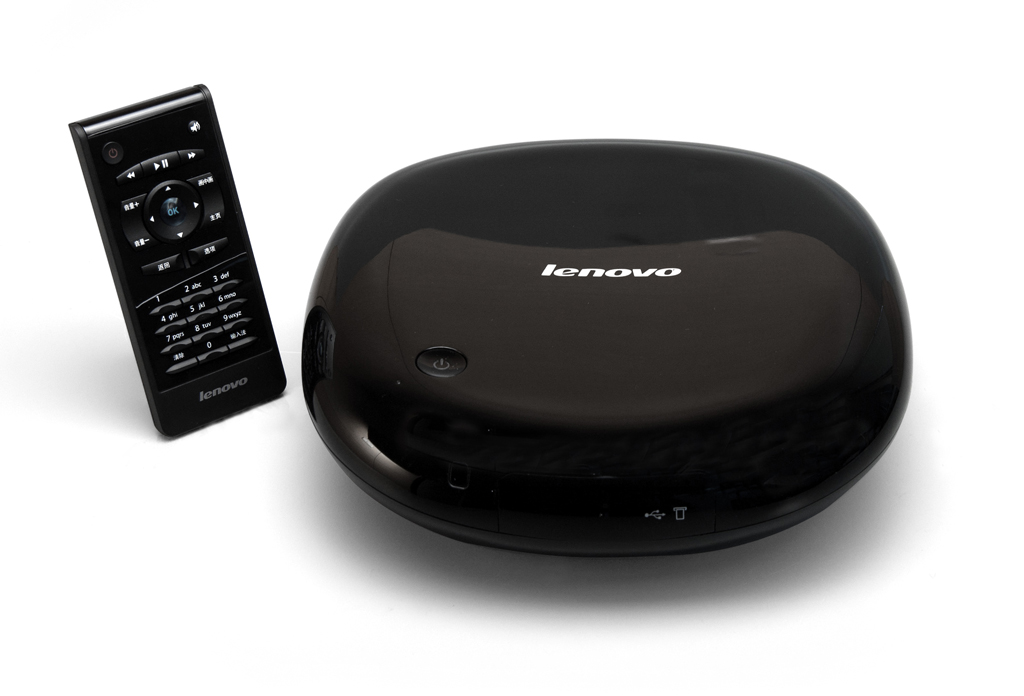
Lenovo A30 set-top box

Hybrid set-top boxes, such as those used for Smart TV programming, enable viewers to access multiple TV delivery methods (including terrestrial, cable, internet, and satellite); like IPTV boxes, they include video on demand, video streaming, time-shifting TV, Internet applications, videotelephony, surveillance, gaming, shopping, TV-centric electronic program guides, and e-government. By integrating varying delivery streams, hybrids (sometimes known as "TV-centric") enable pay-TV operators more flexible application deployment, which decreases the cost of launching new services, increases speed to market, and limits disruption for consumers. Also, a set-top box with modern embedded operating system (such as Android) included can be called Smart set-top box.

As examples, Hybrid Broadcast Broadband TV (HbbTV) set-top boxes allow traditional TV broadcasts, whether from terrestrial (DTT), satellite, or cable providers, to be brought together with video delivered over the Internet and personal multimedia content. Advanced Digital Broadcast (ADB) launched its first hybrid DTT/IPTV set-top box in 2005, which provided Telefónica with the digital TV platform for its Movistar TV service by the end of that year. In 2009, ADB provided Europe's first three-way hybrid digital TV platform to Polish digital satellite operator n, which enables subscribers to view integrated content whether delivered via satellite, terrestrial, or internet.

UK-based Inview Technology has over 8 million STBs deployed in the UK for teletext and an original push VOD service for Top Up TV.

=== IPTV receiver ===
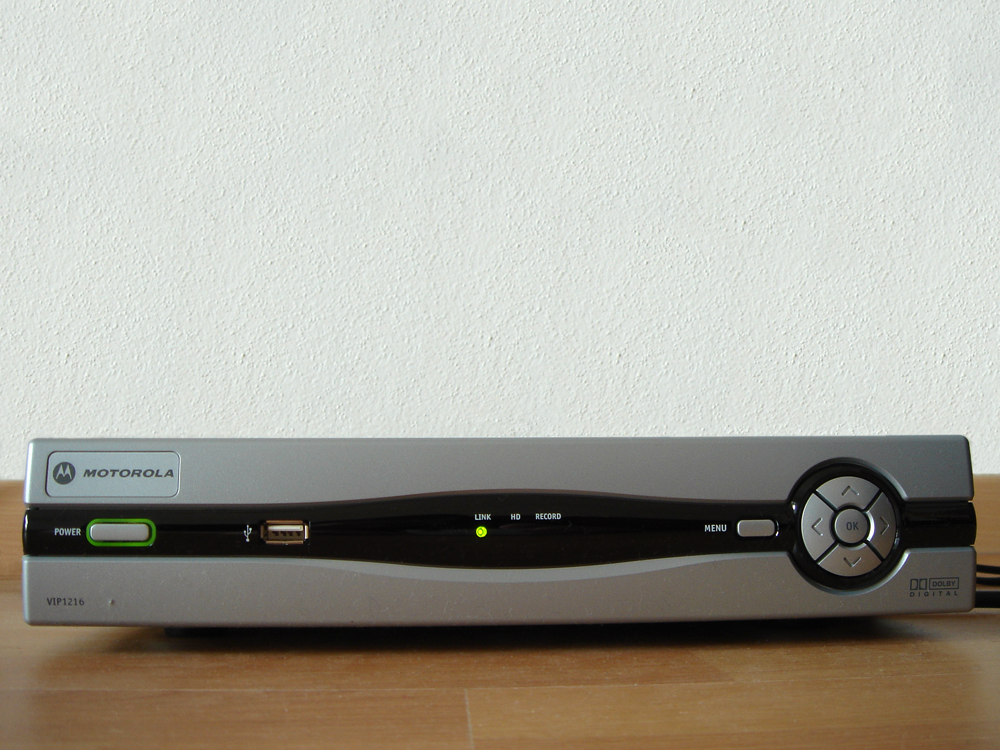
An older model IPTV receiver set-top box built by Motorola

In IPTV networks, the set-top box is a small computer providing two-way communications on an IP network and decoding the video streaming media. IP set-top boxes have a built-in home network interface that can be Ethernet, Wireless (802.11 g,n,ac), or one of the existing wire home networking technologies such as HomePNA or the ITU-T G.hn standard, which provides a way to create a high-speed (up to 1 Gbit/s) local area network using existing home wiring (power lines, phone lines, and coaxial cables).

In the US and Europe, telephone companies use IPTV (often on ADSL or optical fibre networks) as a means to compete with traditional local cable television monopolies.

This type of service is distinct from streaming television, which involves third-party content over the public Internet not controlled by the local system operator.

== Features ==
=== Programming features ===
==== Electronic program guide ====
Electronic program guides and interactive program guides provide users of television, radio, and other media applications with continuously updated menus displaying broadcast programming or scheduling information for current and upcoming programming. Some guides, such as ITV, also feature backward scrolling to promote their catch-up content.

==== Favorites ====
This feature allows the user to choose preferred channels, making them easier and quicker to access; this is handy with the wide range of digital channels on offer. The concept of favourite channels is superficially similar to that of the "bookmark" function offered in many web browsers.

==== Timer ====
The timer allows the user to program and enable the box to switch between channels at certain times: this is handy to record from more than one channel while the user is out. The user still needs to program the VCR or DVD recorder.

=== Convenience features ===
==== Controls on the box ====
Some models have controls on the box, as well as on the remote control. This is useful should the user lose the remote or if the batteries age.

==== Remote controls that work with other TVs ====
Some remote controls can also control some basic functions of various brands of TVs. This allows the user to use just one remote to turn the TV on and off, adjust volume, or switch between digital and analogue TV channels or between terrestrial and internet channels.

==== Parental locks ====
The parental lock or content filters allow users over 18 years old to block access to channels that are not appropriate for children, using a personal identification number. Some boxes simply block all channels, while others allow the user to restrict access to chosen channels not suitable for children below certain ages.

=== Software alternatives ===
As complexity and potential programming faults of the set-top box increase, software such as MythTV, Select-TV and Microsoft's Media Center have developed features comparable to those of set-top boxes, ranging from basic DVR-like functionality to DVD copying, home automation, and housewide music or video playback.

=== Firmware update features ===
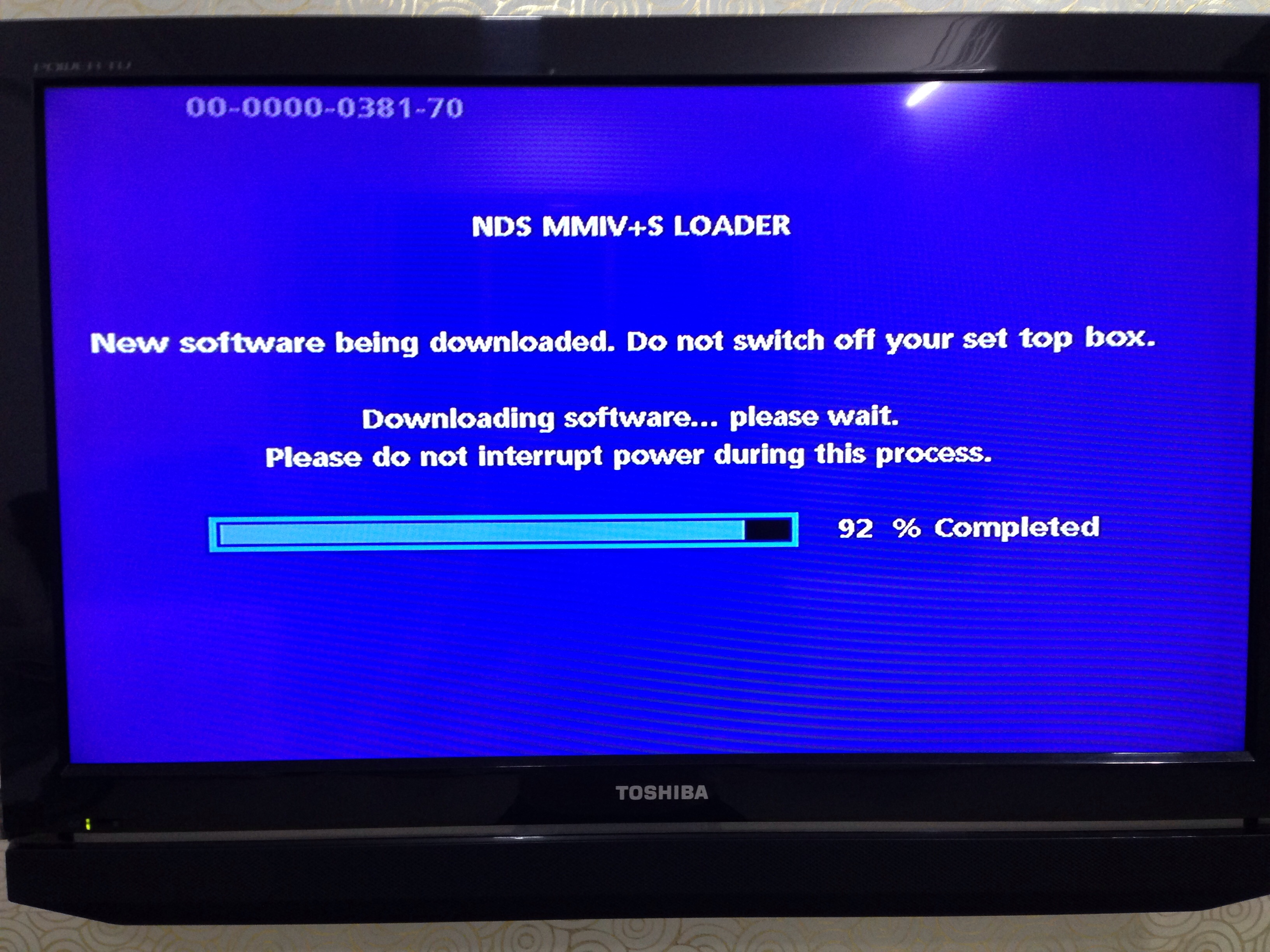
Set-top box firmware being updated

Almost all modern set-top boxes feature automatic firmware update processes. The firmware update is typically provided by the service provider.

== Ambiguities in the definition ==
With the advent of flat-panel televisions, set-top boxes are now deeper in profile than the tops of most modern TV sets. Because of this, set-top boxes are often placed beneath televisions, and the term set-top box has become something of a misnomer, possibly helping the adoption of the term digibox. Additionally, newer set-top boxes that sit at the edge of IP-based distribution networks are often called net-top boxes or NTBs, to differentiate between IP and RF inputs. The Roku LT is around the size of a pack of cards and delivers Smart TV to conventional sets.

The distinction between external tuner or demodulator boxes (traditionally considered to be "set-top boxes") and storage devices (such as VCR, DVD, or disc-based PVR units) is also blurred by the increasing deployment of satellite and cable tuner boxes with a hard disk, network or USB interfaces built-in.

Devices with the capabilities of computer terminals, such as the WebTV thin client, also fall into the grey area that could invite the term "NTB".

=== Europe ===
In Europe, a set-top box does not necessarily contain a tuner of its own. A box connected to a television (or VCR) SCART connector is fed with the baseband television signal from the set's tuner, and can have the television display the returned processed signal instead.

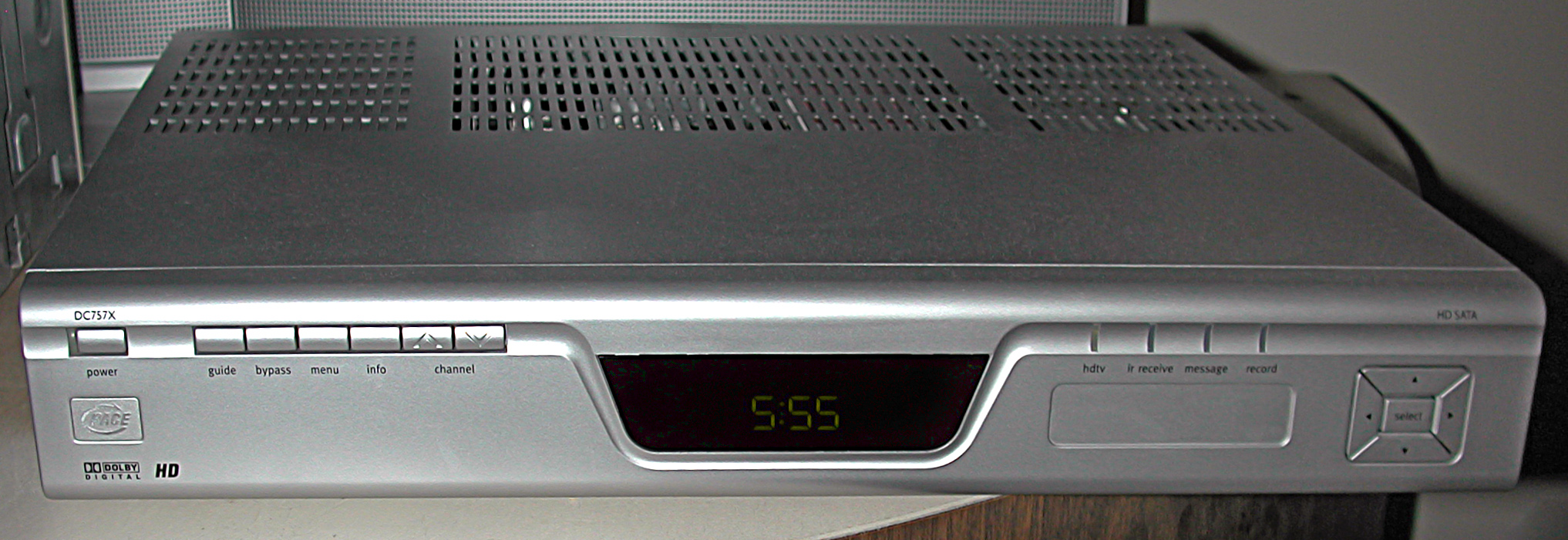
Pace Micro Technology DC757X set top box

This SCART feature had been used for connection to analogue decoding equipment by pay-TV operators in Europe, and in the past, it was used for connection to teletext equipment before the decoders became built-in. The outgoing signal could be of the same nature as the incoming signal, or RGB component video, or even an "insert" over the original signal, due to the "fast switching" feature of SCART.

In case of analogue pay-TV, this approach avoided the need for a second remote control. The use of digital television signals in more modern pay-TV schemes requires that decoding take place before the digital-to-analogue conversion step, rendering the video outputs of an analogue SCART connector no longer suitable for interconnection to decryption hardware. Standards such as DVB's Common Interface and ATSC's CableCARD therefore use a PCMCIA-like card inserted as part of the digital signal path as their alternative to a tuner-equipped set-top box.

== Costs ==
According to the Los Angeles Times, the cost to a cable provider in the United States for a set-top box is between $150 for a basic box to $250 for a more sophisticated box. In 2016, the average pay-TV subscriber paid $231 per year to lease their set-top box from a cable service provider.

== Energy use ==
In June 2011, a report from the American National Resources Defense Council brought attention to the energy efficiency of set-top boxes, and the United States Department of Energy announced plans to consider the adoption of energy efficiency standards for set-top boxes. In November 2011, the National Cable & Telecommunications Association announced a new energy efficiency initiative that commits the largest American cable operators to the purchase of set-top boxes that meet Energy Star standards and the development of sleep modes that will use less energy when the set-top box is not being used to watch or record video.

== See also ==
- AllVid
- CableCARD
- Comparison of digital media players
- DTV receiver
- Digital media player
- Microconsole
- Over-the-top media service
