= Sneak Prevue =

- Sneak Prevue's last ident from 1999 to closure.
- Country: United States
- Broadcast area: Nationwide

Programming
- Language: English
- Picture format: 480i (SDTV)

Ownership
- Owner: Prevue Networks (United Video Satellite Group) (1991–1999); Gemstar-TV Guide International (1999–2002)

History
- Launched: 1991; 35 years ago
- Closed: April 2002; 24 years ago

Sneak Prevue was an American pay television network that served as a barker channel to provide previews of pay-per-view films and events to cable television providers. The channel launched in 1991 and existed until 2002.

== History ==
Sneak Prevue logo used from 1996 to 1999.

Sneak Prevue launched in 1991 as a service for promoting pay-per-view services, providing viewers with a listing and showcase of the events and movies that were showing in the next 30 minutes, up to previews of coming films and events. It was originally owned by the Prevue Networks subsidiary of United Video Satellite Group, and was spun off from the television listings service Prevue Channel (which would become TVGN, and is now known as Pop). In 1999, when the Prevue Channel transformed into the TV Guide Channel, Sneak Prevue remained under its respective name and format.

Sneak Prevue was a separate channel in itself on many cable systems. However, on some smaller cable headends, Prevue Channel and Sneak Prevue shared the same channel space with Prevue Channel taking 35 minutes each hour and Sneak Prevue taking the remaining 25 minutes (usually at the bottom of each hour). This arrangement came at a time before digital cable was implemented years later.

On June 11, 1998, United Video Satellite Group purchased TV Guide from News Corporation for $800 million and 60 million shares of stock worth an additional $1.2 billion (this followed an earlier merger attempt between the two companies in 1996 that eventually fell apart). This resulted in subsequent renaming of Prevue Channel to the TV Guide Channel on February 1. Following the purchase, a revamp of Sneak Prevue's software and on-air presentation was implemented after February 1, 1999, or whenever cable companies upgraded their equipment for TVGC's new presentation mode.

On October 5, 1999, Gemstar International Group Ltd. purchased United Video Satellite Group, which was renamed Gemstar-TV Guide International; the two companies had previously been involved in a legal battle over the intellectual property rights for their respective interactive program guide systems, VCR Plus+ and TV Guide On Screen, that began in 1994.

In December 1999, the new management planned another revamp for the network, with plans to rename the channel as Screen TV. These plans included more focus on other services from participating providers, such as digital cable and high-speed internet, and short-form programming relating to the types of programming seen on PPV, as well as celebrity interviews. However, these plans were eventually scrapped for various reasons (including the move to digital cable, as well as the lack of customization providers carrying Screen TV would have had, in comparison to Sneak Prevue). The channel quietly ceased operations in April 2002 as its content was merged within the scrolling listings grid of parent network TV Guide Channel, including pricing and ordering information. This was most likely due to the fact that dominant pay-per-view provider In Demand provided its own barker channel, and as a result of other cable systems deciding to advertise their film lineups on their own. The ending also coincided with the discontinuation of Laserdisc production by Imation.

== Format ==
Like the Prevue Channel, Sneak Prevue was personalized for cable and satellite providers, featuring the individual provider's logos with advertisements and listings. The service also utilized Amiga 2000 hardware, which the Prevue Channel used to provide its scrolling listings grid. Since Sneak Prevue used the same brand of computer hardware as Prevue Guide (although the terminal powering the Sneak Prevue video and graphics was hooked up to headends separately from the terminal used to power the Prevue system), the Amiga system was known for crashing periodically, often with a screen notifying viewers to stand by due to difficulties with the system. Additionally, the system would also freeze frequently. A black line would often run across the entire screen until cable system technicians finally restored the service by rebooting its hardware.

The channel featured shortened trailers to preview movies and events expected to air on the provider's pay-per-view services, which were provided to cable and satellite operators regularly both on laserdisc as well as via a continuous satellite feed. These short trailers, whether sourced locally or delivered via satellite, would feature listings and ordering information at the bottom of the screen, which was locally overlaid into their video feed to provide system-specific scheduling information, with countdowns to the next telecast of the program appearing at the top left of the screen.

The main listings were displayed behind a series of colorful backgrounds with the current date on the top left of the screen, the current time (displayed in the same hour/minute/second format as that used on Prevue/TV Guide Channel's on-screen grid) on the top right, the cable or satellite provider's logo in the top center and pay-per-view listings text on the remaining three-quarters of the screen. Various clips of production music played over the full-screen listings, with an audio track of an announcer or an audio skit promoting the channel and pay-per-view. Throughout its nearly 11-year tenure, many changes were made to the on-screen backgrounds and music.

Segments similar to those seen on Prevue/TV Guide Channel were featured on the service including "Sneak Prevue Tonight" (which featured information on that evening's pay-per-view programming), "Up Next" (featuring information on programs starting in the next half-hour or hour), "Adults Only" (featuring previews of programming on adult-oriented networks such as Hot Choice; video trailers seen during this segment did not include any overt sexual content) and "Premiering Soon" (which provided previews of films and events set to air on pay-per-view in the next few weeks). Often, advertisements from the local cable provider would be inserted onto the channel, promoting that company's products and services.

== Network slogans ==
- "Sneak Prevue... See What's On!" (1996–1998)
- "Sneak Prevue First!" (1998–2002; also referred to as "Always Think Sneak Prevue First!")
