= Samia Khan =

American writer, producer, and actress

- Born: April 4, 1985 (age 41); Fresno, California, U.S.
- Education: University of Southern California
- Occupations: News Personality, Writer, Producer, Actress
- Years active: 2009 - active
- Website: www.khanversations.com

Samia Khan (born April 4, 1985) is an American writer, producer, actress, blogger and news personality who most recently co-hosted FOX News Now, a digital news operation based in Phoenix, Arizona. She made headlines in November 2016 after she wrote a personal account on her Facebook page detailing her experience with racism and sexual harassment while covering Trump's 2016 election win.

In 2013, she co-created Instacurity, a satirical web series and internet movement that used comedy to address society's obsession with their social media self. She defined the word “Instacurity” as “an excessive concern with one’s social media presence, influence, and/or likeability. The project was featured by TIME, Mashable, Good Morning America and more.

== Early life ==
Khan was born in Fresno. California to a Pakistani mother and an Indian father. She attended Edison High School in Fresno and graduated from the University of Southern California with a degree in Broadcast Journalism.

== Career ==
Khan started her career as a TV news reporter before transitioning to entertainment reporting for TV Guide Network’s nightly entertainment news show Hollywood 411. In 2009, she launched her blog Khanversations to recap her humorous celebrity interviews and was selected as a video blogger for Samsung at the 2010 Winter Olympics in Vancouver. She was later selected as a finalist to cover the 2010 FIFA World Cup for Sony. She also hosted Revision3 show SGNL by Sony with Anthony Carboni and was a contributing co-host to The Young Turks and various comedy podcasts. She has written hundreds of articles for NBC News in Los Angeles and worked as a contributor to Backstage Magazine.

In 2013, she co-founded Instacurity, a satirical webseries that used comedy to address society’s obsession with their social media selves. She created and starred in more than a dozen comedy videos.

In 2014, she started working as an on-air host for FOX News Now in Phoenix, Arizona.

In 2018, Khan announced she had quit her job at FOX and was working on creative projects. According to IMDb, she has a show called Khanflicted currently in the works. She is also working on a non-fiction book.

== Personal life ==
In 2016, Khan’s Facebook post about being harassed by Trump supporters. In 2018, Khan revealed her own struggles with social media’s effect on her mental health on Facebook.

== Filmography ==
Year	Title	Role
2009 – 2010	Hollywood 411	Entertainment Reporter
2010	Vancouver Winter Olympics	Samsung Video Blogger
2011 – 2012	SGNL by Sony	Host
2013	The Young Turks	Guest Host
2013	Instacurity	Actress/Writer/Producer
2015	Glee	Cheerio Cheerleader
2014 - 2017	Fox News Now	Host
2019	Khanflicted	TBD
