= The CW Plus =

Secondary syndication feed of The CW

- Type: Syndicated programming service
- Country: United States
- Broadcast area: National (available only in smaller television markets)
- Network: The CW
- Headquarters: Burbank, California (main headquarters); Los Angeles, California (centralcasting)

Programming
- Language: English
- Picture format: 480i (SDTV); 1080i or 720p (HDTV) (resolution varies depending on the affiliate)

Ownership
- Owner: Nexstar Media Group (81.1%); Skydance (18.9%)
- Parent: The CW Network, LLC

History
- Launched: September 18, 2006; 20 years ago
- Replaced: The WB 100+ Station Group

Links
- Website: cwplustv.com

The CW Plus is a secondary national broadcast television syndication service feed of The CW, which is controlled by Nexstar Media Group, which holds a 81.1% ownership interest in the network, with Skydance holding an 18.9% stake. It is intended primarily for American television markets ranked #100 and above by Nielsen Media Research estimates. The service is primarily carried on digital subchannels and multichannel subscription television providers, although it maintains primary affiliations on full-power and low-power stations in certain markets.

Along with airing the network's prime time, Saturday morning and live sports programming, The CW Plus offers a master schedule of first-run, off-network and brokered programs available for syndication distribution to fill the network's dark time. The CW handles programming and promotional services for The CW Plus at its corporate headquarters in Burbank, California (marketing services were handled through a separate division for the service until March 2008, when these operations were transferred to The CW's marketing department due to layoffs); centralcasting operations for the CW Plus affiliates are hubbed at the California Video Center in Los Angeles.

== History ==
=== Background (The WB 100+ Station Group) ===
The CW Plus traces its existence to The WB 100+ Station Group (initially known as The WeB until March 1999), a similar national feed of CW co-predecessor, The WB, which began operations on September 21, 1998. Conceived under the same concept as Foxnet (developed by WB network co-founder and original president Jamie Kellner during his preceding tenure as the original president of the Fox network), The WB 100+ was designed to distribute WB programming to small- and select medium-sized "white area" markets, primarily Designated Market Areas (DMA) ranked #100 and higher under annual Nielsen Market Universe estimates, that had five or fewer commercial television stations licensed within the designated market area through local cable providers (which owned affiliates of the feed individually or in consortiums, often entering into agreements with a local broadcast station to handle advertising and other management services for the WB 100+ outlet), or stations The WB refused to make affiliation offers due to overall low broadcasting quality standards or giving a priority to another network.

By its design, the initial cable-only composition of The WB 100+ Station Group’s affiliate body acted as a workaround to issues that The WB had encountered since its December 1993 founding with securing broadcast affiliates; these difficulties resulted in The WB having to rely on the national superstation feed of Chicago affiliate WGN-TV (later WGN America, relaunched as NewsNation in March 2021) to distribute its programming to markets without existing over-the-air WB affiliates. (In certain “white area” markets, the only option for over-the-air carriage was to maintain a secondary affiliation with an existing network outlet, subjecting WB programs to being aired via tape delay outside of key timeslots.) Beginning in 2002, The WB 100+ added conventional broadcast affiliations in the few eligible markets that had at least five commercial stations; the feed continued to operate until The WB ended operations on September 17, 2006.

=== Development and concept ===
Former logo for KDLH in Duluth, Minnesota. Similar logos are used by most CW Plus stations as well as some conventional CW affiliates.

On February 24, 2006, one month after CBS Corporation (later ViacomCBS, now Paramount Global) and Time Warner (later WarnerMedia, now Warner Bros. Discovery) announced the launch of the new network, The CW formally released a proposal to prospective affiliates announcing the creation of The CW Plus, a similar single-network feed for smaller markets – covering the same areas that were served by The WB 100+. While there was no guarantee that existing affiliates of The WB 100+ would automatically join The CW Plus, most of them (particularly cable-only affiliates) ultimately did join the new service, and programming transitioned seamlessly from The WB 100+ to The CW Plus.

Since The WB 100+ was created before digital television was easily available in the United States, most WB 100+ stations were distributed exclusively via local cable television providers, with a few main channel affiliations on broadcast television stations. With its launch, The CW (along with MyNetworkTV) became among the first conventional broadcast networks in the U.S. to fully utilize digital multicasting to gain over-the-air coverage in markets that did not have enough television stations to maintain a traditional main channel affiliation (Fox, The WB and fellow CW predecessor UPN had a few subchannel-only affiliates shortly before The CW launched; however, over-the-air distribution in this manner was very limited at the time).

In several markets served by a CW Plus station, the current affiliate may not be the same as the prior WB 100+ affiliate. Many local CW Plus outlets located in markets where the predecessor WB 100+ affiliate was cable-exclusive are instead carried on a digital subchannel of a local broadcast station, usually an affiliate of a competing "Big Four" network (ABC, NBC, CBS or Fox). This distribution method resulted in an unusual quirk for The CW itself in Florence–Myrtle Beach, South Carolina, in which WWMB programmed its main channel as a conventional CW outlet (airing the network’s base schedule, accompanied by syndicated and paid programs that were acquired and slotted by the station) while simultaneously offering the CW Plus feed (a byproduct of former WWMB owner SagamoreHill Broadcasting inheriting the assets of cable-only WB 100+ affiliate "WFWB”) over its DT2 subchannel. (WWMB’s main CW affiliation moved to the DT2 subchannel of ABC-affiliated sister WPDE-TV on September 20, 2021, with Dabl replacing CW network and syndicated programs previously shown on its main channel and TBD replacing The CW Plus on WWMB-DT2.) Certain cable-only affiliates of The WB 100+ have been replaced completely by either a subchannel or main channel broadcast affiliation when The CW launched or joined The CW Plus only for a broadcast station that managed or acquired it to begin carrying it over-the-air at some point after its launch.

As with The WB 100+, CW Plus programming is delivered through a data server network that originally digitally transmitted locally and national advertisements, promos, station identifications and customized logo bugs for each individual affiliate to headends within the master control facilities of a local station or the offices of the multichannel television provider operating the local affiliate. That was the case with The WB 100+, promotions for syndicated programs aired on The CW Plus omit affiliate references – either in the form of verbal identification or use of the affiliate's logo – in favor of network branding; the timeslot cards also only list airtimes based on Eastern and Central Time Zone scheduling, with the announcer being used to read the promo's airtime card only identifying that the program airs "[today/tonight/day of week] on The CW."

Programming is relayed to a wireless PC-based system that downloads (through a data feed distributed via satellite), stores and inserts advertising during program breaks controlled via a playlist over the satellite-delivered national feed to the individual affiliate's home market; the units also transfer program feeds via address headers disseminated to each affiliate based on their call letters, transmit advertisements and program promotions, and generate a log of ads that have previously aired. The cost of these units is partially reimbursed by The CW, with no more than 50-percent of the purchase cost paid by the affiliate. Affiliates sent log files of local advertisements over the Internet to a traffic management system located at The CW's corporate offices in Burbank, which handles trafficking, dissemination of the program feed and specified local insertion of advertisements and promotions to each affiliate. After The CW stopped providing support for the traffic system and commercial server in September 2009, responsibility for ad trafficking and insertion was transferred to The CW Plus' individual affiliates, although The CW continues to handle programming and transmission operations.

CW Plus stations are generally managed and promoted by a local affiliate of a larger over-the-air television station, which may produce some local programming (such as morning and/or prime time newscasts), telecasts of local sports events, network events from CW Sports or syndicated national sports broadcasts; some affiliates, however, are operated by a local cable provider.

CW Plus affiliates each have their own local branding, which is usually a combination of the CW name with either the parent station/cable franchise's city of license or a regional descriptor of the area (such as "Northland" for Duluth and northeastern Minnesota, as seen in the logo to the above left). Unlike its predecessor, The WB 100+ Station Group, The CW Plus does not use call signs used solely for branding and/or supplementary identification purposes in a widespread fashion; while many cable-only WB 100+-turned-CW Plus affiliates have stopped using fictional call signs (which were not assigned by the Federal Communications Commission, as the agency does not issue licenses to cable channels), a few have continued to use the ones they had used while part of The WB 100+ Station Group, mainly doing so merely for identification purposes in local Nielsen diary-tabulated ratings reports.

The CW Plus originally maintained a separate website featuring promotions for CW network programs, search maps for CW Plus affiliates, programming schedules customizable to an affiliate's local time zone, and still promotional ads for CW network shows and syndicated programs are seen on the CW Plus feed. In May 2014, YourCWTV.com was discontinued as a standalone website, redirecting to The CW's main website at CWTV.com. However, the websites of all CW Plus affiliates continue to be hosted on the YourCWTV.com domain, featuring much of the aforementioned content seen on the national website; as well as links to websites and social media pages operated by the affiliate or a parent over-the-air station, and links to the affiliate's contact information, advertising services and (where applicable) the main website of a parent broadcast affiliate. A separate website for the service was reinstated in September 2017, under the CWPlusTV.com domain.

On January 5, 2022, The Wall Street Journal reported that Paramount Global (at the time ViacomCBS) and WarnerMedia (who was splitting off from AT&T and merging with Discovery, Inc.) were exploring a possible sale of either a majority stake or all of The CW, and that Nexstar Media Group, which became The CW's largest affiliate group when it acquired former WB-era network co-owner Tribune Broadcasting in 2019, was considered a leading bidder. Network president/CEO Mark Pedowitz confirmed talks of a potential sale in a memo to CW staffers, but added that "It's too early to speculate what might happen" and that the network "must continue to do what we do best". Nexstar CEO Perry Sook, for his company's part, hinted only that "I wouldn’t be surprised if we owned a broadcast network" and other cable networks that could "layer on top of our local content foundation" (Nexstar's network properties include the NewsNation cable network and broadcast diginets Antenna TV and Rewind TV). In late June 2022, the WSJ indicated a purchase of The CW by Nexstar was close, with the company acquiring a 75-percent majority, while the remaining 25-percent would be shared equally by Paramount and Warner Bros. Discovery. Nexstar confirmed the deal on August 15; on the same day, it took over The CW's operations as the sale did not need any regulatory approval. Nexstar intended to make The CW profitable by 2025 by broadening the network's appeal - including sitcoms, older-targeting dramas, and procedurals in the lineup - and seeking cost-conscious programming, such as unscripted and syndicated programming. The CW Plus was included in the deal, which was closed on October 3. In December 2024, Nexstar acquired additional ownership of The CW, raising its stake from 75% to 77.1%.

== Programming ==
The CW Plus operates three separate feeds for the Eastern/Central, Mountain and Pacific Time Zones (the latter also acts as an hour-behind timeshift feed for the Alaska Time Zone with timeslot modifications for network daytime and certain syndicated weekend programs), and designs the master schedules of each feed so that The CW's broadcast affiliate feed aligns with the regional start time of most network programming; as such, the One Magnificent Morning educational block – which is designed to be tape-delayed – airs one hour early in some areas, compared to its preferred scheduling (including on affiliates in the Central and Alaska time zones). Formerly, The CW Daytime, which was also designed to be tape-delayed, had followed this scheduling as well until the block was discontinued on September 3, 2021, as a trade-off to the network's affiliates tied to its October 2 expansion of prime time programming to Saturdays. Syndicated programs broadcast on The CW Plus during non-network programming hours as of September 2024 include The Steve Wilkos Show, Karamo, Divorce Court, We the People with Judge Lauren Lake, Friends, Dish Nation, The Good Doctor, Chicago P.D., TMZ on TV / TMZ Live, and Maury.

Like the predecessor WB 100+ Station Group, The CW Plus utilizes a dual programming structure differing from the traditional American broadcast programming model used by CW-affiliated stations in all but a couple of the Nielsen-ranked "top 100" television markets. To fill dayparts on The CW Plus not reserved to the main network feed, The CW – asserting programming acquisition duties traditionally handled by the local affiliate operator – purchases cash- and barter-sold programs distributed for first-run and off-network syndication to occupy most daytime and evening timeslots throughout the week, syndicated feature film packages to occupy afternoon and late access timeslots on Saturdays and Sundays, and paid programming purchased through time-buys with direct response infomercial production firms and teleministries to occupy overnight and some early afternoon timeslots. The network's handling of these duties, along with the master schedule composition of the CW Plus feed, relieves the local affiliate's operator from needing to acquire and budget for syndicated programming to fill timeslots not occupied by The CW's base network schedule. Individual CW Plus affiliate operators handle advertising sales for local commercials inserted into the corresponding feed during designated ad breaks within network and syndicated programs aired on the service.

Prior to the debut of the Litton Entertainment-produced One Magnificent Morning block on the network in October 2014, the remaining two hours of programming that fulfill FCC educational programming guidelines which were not covered by The CW's predecessor children's program blocks – Kids' WB, The CW4Kids/Toonzai and Vortexx – was also taken care of by The CW Plus. However even after the debut of One Magnificent Morning, The CW Plus continued to offer syndicated educational programs on Saturday early afternoons immediately after the conclusion of the block, resulting the feed airing a net surplus of seven hours of E/I programming each week (five hours provided by The CW, and two hours supplied by The CW Plus) that far exceeded the FCC’s minimum three-hour requirement. The feed’s supplementary E/I content was reduced to just one half-hour in September 2015 (consisting solely of Elizabeth Stanton's Great Big World) and was concurrently shifted to a Saturday late-night timeslot; the supplementary syndication E/I window was eliminated in September 2016, leaving the shows aired within the One Magnificent Morning block as the only educational programming offered by the feed (which later reduced its runtime to three hours since 2017).

Operators of local CW Plus affiliates (whether a parent broadcast station or cable franchisee) can substitute syndicated programs on the feed’s schedule with alternative programming if the local syndication rights to a particular program on the CW Plus master schedule are held by the parent station’s main channel (if it is not already affiliated with The CW Plus), by any additional subchannels offered by the parent station or by a competing station within the DMA. Optionally, CW Plus broadcast affiliates may offer programming from a multicast-originated network (such as MeTV, This TV or Antenna TV) on a part-time basis during the feed’s designated paid programming time, particularly if the network being sourced lacks an existing full-time affiliate within the DMA. (Monroe, Louisiana affiliate KCWL-LD – the only CW Plus affiliate to maintain a secondary affiliation with that service – has carried CW competitor MyNetworkTV in the subfeed’s late-night paid programming slot since 2017, as late-night slotting increasingly became a common fate for MyNetworkTV in the years since its 2009 conversion from a television network to a programming service.)

The CW Plus offers three designated "Live Local News Windows" – a weekday morning window from 7:00–8:00 a.m. in all time zones and half-hour evening windows scheduled, depending on the time zone, nightly at 10:00 (ET/PT) or 9:00 p.m. (CT/MT/AT) and weekend evenings at 6:00 (ET/PT) or 5:00 p.m. (CT/MT/AT) – as options for affiliates to air local newscasts (either produced by the parent station or a station co-managed with the local CW Plus outlet, or via a news share agreement with a competing network affiliate) at their discretion. Although The CW has never carried any national news programming of its own, The CW Plus had served as a national carrier of syndicated morning news/talk program The Daily Buzz, which aired on the feed from September 2006 until September 2014, eight months prior to the program's April 2015 cancellation. (The predecessor WB 100+ Station Group had originally acquired the national syndication rights for the program, which aired on that feed from September 2002 until its conversion into The CW Plus.)

== Availability ==
As of 2025, The CW Plus has current and pending affiliation agreements with 123 television outlets encompassing 44 states and the U.S. territories of Guam, Puerto Rico, and the United States Virgin Islands, consisting of 121 broadcast affiliates (109 of which serve as subchannel-only affiliates and the remaining 18 being primary channel affiliation). Counting mainly over-the-air affiliates of the service, The CW Plus covers an estimated national audience reach of 73,120,898 U.S. residents or 23.40-percent of all households with at least one television set.

Availability of CW Plus stations through pay television services varies depending on the provider; while CW Plus outlets are usually carried by major cable, fiber optic and IPTV providers (including multiple-system and private cable operators) in markets served by a subchannel or cable-only affiliate of the service, some rural pay television franchises that do not carry a local CW Plus affiliate via an existing distribution agreement with a broadcast affiliate or through the absence of an agreement with the operator of a cable-only affiliate carry CW stations from adjacent larger markets.

In certain markets, satellite providers DirecTV and Dish Network carry stations that maintain primary affiliations with The CW Plus – and in some cases, also carry a subchannel-only affiliate of the service – as part of their local station tiers; however in areas served by a cable-only or subchannel affiliate, subscribers of both providers can only receive out-of-market broadcast affiliates and owned-and-operated stations of The CW (DirecTV carries affiliates from neighboring markets that have main channel affiliations with the network in some smaller markets, with the provider's West Coast network outlet KTLA in Los Angeles, which is available in lieu of a local or nearby affiliate in others; Dish Network provides CW programming to its subscribers in smaller markets through de facto network flagship WPIX—New York City, (Note: Operated by Nexstar for station owner Mission Broadcasting) O&Os WDCW—Washington, D.C., KTLA—Los Angeles and KWGN-TV—Denver, (all of which were previously owned by Tribune Broadcasting until the closure of Nexstar's acquisition of its corporate parent, Tribune Media, in September 2019)), which are available as part of its a la carte superstation tier, which is no longer offered to new customers.

Since the conversion of the CW Plus feeds to a high definition schedule in June 2012, many of The CW Plus's stations have converted to carrying the high definition feed on an over-the-air signal, though it is usually transmitted in 720p rather than the network's 1080i master resolution due to technical considerations for their parent station's main network feed – except in the few markets where a CW Plus broadcast affiliate does not also have an affiliation with a major broadcast network – on their primary channel. Before that, the parent stations also carried the main CW signal in HD mixed with the CW Plus schedule to provide high definition programming from the network to local cable and satellite providers.

== See also ==
- The WB 100+ Station Group
- WGN America
- Foxnet
