= History of Pop (American TV channel) =

The American cable and satellite television network Pop was launched in 1981 as a barker channel service providing a display of localized channel and program listings for cable television providers. Later on, the service, branded Prevue Channel or Prevue Guide and later as Prevue, began to broadcast interstitial segments alongside the on-screen guide, which included entertainment news and promotions for upcoming programs. After Prevue's parent company, United Video Satellite Group, acquired the entertainment magazine TV Guide in 1998 (UVSG would in turn, be acquired by Gemstar the following year), the service was relaunched as TV Guide Channel (later TV Guide Network), which featured full-length programs dealing with the entertainment industry, including news magazines and reality shows, along with red carpet coverage from major award shows.

Following the acquisition of TV Guide Network by Lionsgate in 2009, its programming began to shift towards general entertainment with reruns of dramas and sitcoms. In 2013, CBS Corporation acquired of a 50% stake in the network, and the network was renamed TVGN. At the same time, as its original purpose grew obsolete because of the integrated program guides offered by digital television platforms, the network began to downplay and phase out its program listings service; as of June 2014, none of the network's carriage contracts require the display of the listings, and they were excluded entirely from its high-definition simulcast. In 2015, the network was rebranded as Pop. In March 2019, CBS acquired Lionsgate's 50% stake in the network.

== History ==
=== 1980s ===
==== Electronic program guide ====
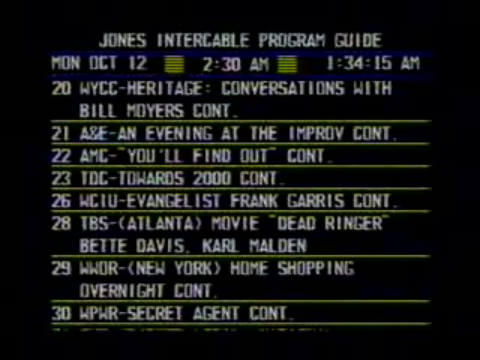
Electronic Program Guide (EPG Sr)

Launched in 1981 by United Video Satellite Group, the network began its life as a simple electronic program guide (EPG) software application sold to cable system operators throughout the United States and Canada. Known simply as the Electronic Program Guide, the software was designed to be run within the headend facility of each participating cable system on a single, custom-modified consumer-grade computer supplied by United Video. Its scrolling program listings grid, which cable system operators broadcast to subscribers on a dedicated channel, covered the entire screen and provided four hours of listings for each system's entire channel lineup, one half-hour period at a time. Because of this, listings for programs currently airing would often be several minutes from being shown. Additionally, because the EPG software generated only video, cable operators commonly resorted to filling the EPG channel's audio feed with music from a local FM radio station, or with programming from a cable television-oriented audio service provider such as Cable Radio Network.

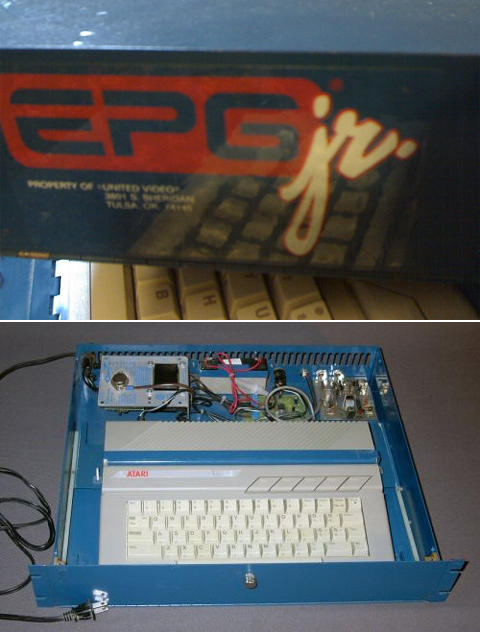
EPG Jr. unit featuring an Atari 130XE

By 1985 and under the newly formed Trakker, Inc. unit of United Video Satellite Group, two versions of the EPG were offered: EPG Jr., a 16KB EPROM version which ran on various Atari models including the 130XE and 600XL, and EPG Sr., a 3½ bootable diskette version for the Amiga 1000. Raw program listings data for national cable networks, as well as for regional and local broadcast stations, were fed en masse from a mainframe based in Tulsa, Oklahoma to each EPG installation via a 2400 baud data stream on an audio subcarrier of WGN by United Video (which was also the satellite distributor of the WGN national superstation feed). On some installations of the EPG, a flashing dot next to the on-screen clock would indicate proper reception of this data. By cherry-picking data from this master feed for only the networks that its cable system actually carried, each EPG installation was able to generate a continuous visual display of program listings customized to its local cable system's unique channel lineup (data describing the unique channel lineup each EPG was to display also arrived via this master feed).

Both the EPG Jr. and EPG Sr. allowed cable operators to further customize their operation locally. Among other functions, the listings grid's scrolling speed could be changed and local text-based advertisements could be inserted. Each text-based advertisement could be configured to display as either a "scroll ad" (appearing within the vertically scrolling listings grid between its half-hour cycles) or as a "crawl ad" (appearing within a horizontally scrolling ticker at the bottom of the screen). If no advertisements were configured as "crawl ads," the bottom ticker would not be shown on-screen. The on-screen appearances of both the Jr. and Sr. versions of the EPG software differed only slightly, due primarily to differences in text font and extended ASCII graphic glyph character rendering between the underlying Atari and Amiga platforms.

Because neither version of the EPG software was capable of silent remote administration for its locally customizable features, cable company employees were required to visit their headend facilities in order to make all necessary adjustments to the software in person. Consequently, EPG channel viewers would often see its otherwise continuous listings interrupted without warning each time a cable company technician brought up its administrative menus to adjust settings, view diagnostics information, or hunt-and-peck new local text advertisements into the menus' built-in text editor.

The Atari-based EPG Jr. units were encased in blue rack enclosures containing custom-made outboard electronics, such as the Zephyrus Electronics Ltd. UV-D-2 demodulator board, which delivered data decoded from the WGN data stream to the Atari's 13 pin SIO port (the EPG Jr. software's EPROM was interfaced to the Atari's ROM cartridge port).

==== Split-screen electronic program guide ====
By the late 1980s, a software upgrade "option" was offered by United Video for the Amiga 1000-based EPG Sr. This updated version featured a program listings grid identical in appearance to that of the original EPG Sr. version, but confined it to the lower half of the screen. In this new split-screen configuration, which was the forerunner to Prevue Guide, the upper half of the screen displayed static or animated graphical advertisements and logos created locally by each cable system operator. Up to 64 such ads were supported by the software, which ranged from ads for local and national businesses to promotions for cable channels carried by the local system. Locally created text-based advertisements were still supported, however, they now also appeared in the top half of the screen – support for showing them within the listings grid as scrolling ads, or beneath it as crawling banner ads, had been removed.

Although most cable systems kept the original, full-screen EPG in operation well into the early 1990s, some systems with large numbers of subscribers opted for this upgraded version of EPG Sr. in order to exploit the revenue potential of its graphical local advertising capabilities. The Atari-based EPG Jr. was never afforded this split-screen upgrade and fell out of favor during the late 1980s as cable systems migrated to the full- or split-screen Amiga 1000-based EPG Sr., and later to the Amiga 2000-based Prevue Guide. However, the EPG Jr. remained in service as late as 2005 on a few small cable systems, as well as on a number of private cable systems operated by various hotel chains and certain housing and apartment complexes.

==== Prevue Guide ====
On April 1, 1988, United Video Holdings' Trakker, Inc. unit was renamed Prevue Networks, Inc. The split-screen version of the EPG Sr. software was further updated and renamed "Prevue Guide". Prevue Guide launched on Tulsa Cable Television channel 13, which replaced a locally programmed 24-hour weather teletext channel that simulcast audio from local NOAA Weather Radio station KIH27. (The assets of Tulsa Cable Television, then a United Artists Cable subsidiary, are now owned by Cox Communications/Spectrum.) Now running on the Amiga 2000, it displayed a split-screen listings grid visually identical to the upgraded EPG Sr.'s, but also supported – along with up to 128 locally inserted top-screen graphical advertisements – the display of video with accompanying sound in the top half of the screen, primarily promos for upcoming television shows, films and special events. These videos appeared in either the left or right halves of the top portion of the screen, coupled with supplementary information concerning the advertised program in the opposing halves (program title, channel, air date and time).

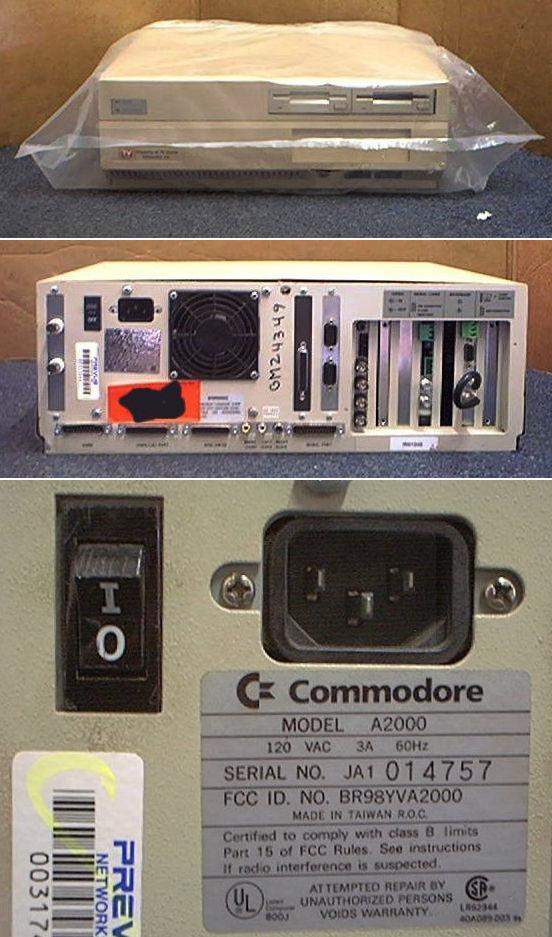
Prevue Guide Amiga 2000 unit (decommissioned)

Making the video integration possible were the Amiga 2000's native video compositing capabilities. All video (and associated audio) content was provided live by Prevue Networks via a special analog C-band satellite backhaul feed from Tulsa. This feed contained a national satellite listings grid in the bottom half of its picture (strictly as a courtesy for the era's C-band dish owners), with the top half of its picture divided horizontally in two, both halves showing promos for unrelated telecasts on different networks (sound for each half was provided in monoaural on the feed's respective left and right audio channels).

Within each cable system's headend facility, meanwhile, the Amiga 2000-powered Prevue Guide software overlaid the bottom half of the satellite feed's video frame with its own, locally generated listings grid. It also continuously chose which of the two simultaneously available promos in the top half of the satellite feed's picture to let local cable subscribers see, patching its audio through to them while visually blocking out the other promo (usually with text promoting the program's next airtime and cable channel). During periods where both of the satellite feed's simultaneous promos were for cable networks not carried by a local cable system, the local Prevue Guide software blocked out both, filling the entire top half of the screen with a local text or graphical advertisement instead (either an ad for a local or national business, or a promotion for a channel that the cable provider carried – displaying that channel's logo and supplementary information on the opposing sides in the upper half). The satellite feed's national scheduling grid was never meant to be seen by cable subscribers. On occasion, however, when a cable system's local Prevue Guide software crashed, causing it to display the Amiga Guru Meditation error message, subscribers would be exposed to the satellite feed's full video frame, letting them see not only the two disparate promos simultaneously running in its upper half, but perhaps more confusingly, the satellite transponder-oriented national listings grid in its lower half.

Commercials – often for psychic hotlines – and featurettes produced by Prevue Networks, such as Prevue Tonight, that were voiced by Larry Hoefling (who served as the network's announcer from 1989 to 1993), were also delivered via this satellite feed. For commercials, as well as overnight and early morning infomercials, the top half of the feed's video frame would be completely filled out, with local cable system Prevue Guide installations letting it show through in full in a pillarboxed anamorphic widescreen format (some direct response ads that were compartmentalized to one area of the video frame featured contact information in the opposing feed that was blocked out, in addition to that provided in the advertisement). The satellite feed also carried a third audio channel containing Prevue Guide theme music in an infinite loop. Local Prevue Guide installations would switch to this audio source during the display of local top-screen advertising, and when they crashed. Prevue Guide could additionally signal cable system video playback equipment to override the Prevue Networks satellite feed entirely with up to nine minutes of local, video-based advertising per hour. Few cable systems utilized this feature, however, owing to the need to produce special versions of their local advertisements wherein, as with the satellite feed itself, all action occurred only within the top half of the video frame.

Other features of Prevue Guide that were unavailable in the earlier full- and split-screen EPG Sr. versions were colorized listings backgrounds and program-by-program channel summaries. Between its already colored grid lines, which alternated blue, green, yellow and red with each half-hour listings cycle, each cable operator could choose to enable either red or light blue (rather than black) background colors for multiple channels of their choice. These backgrounds were usually used to highlight premium channels and pay-per-view services. Additionally, program-by-program channel summaries with light grey backgrounds, for up to four channels of each cable operator's choice, could be included within the scrolling grid. Appearing between each four-hour listings cycle, the names of channels (rather than times) would scroll up and slide into the grid's header bar one at a time (similar to the time bar that scrolled into the header at the start of each listings cycle), each followed by up to four hours worth of program-by-program listings for that channel alone. Prevue Guide could also display graphical weather icons, accompanied by local weather conditions, within its scrolling grid (as part of a segment known as Prevue Weather). These inserts were available to cable operators for an additional fee and appeared after each four-hour listings cycle.

By the early 1990s, United Video began encouraging cable systems still using either the full- or split-screen versions of the Amiga 1000-based EPG Sr. to upgrade to the Amiga 2000-based Prevue Guide. Active support for the Amiga 1000-based EPG Sr. installations was discontinued in 1993. Like the Amiga 1000-based EPG Sr., Prevue Guide also ran from bootable 3½" diskettes, and its locally customizable features remained configurable only from the local keyboard, subjecting viewers to the same on-screen maintenance-related interruptions by local cable company employees as before (silent remote administration of locally customizable features would not be added until the "yellow grid" appeared shortly after the beginning of the TV Guide Channel era, when the Amiga platform was fully abandoned). To support Prevue Guide's new, satellite-delivered video and audio, each Amiga 2000 featured a UV Corp. UVGEN video/genlock card for the satellite feed's video and a Zephyrus Electronics Ltd model 100 rev. C demodulator/switching ISA card for manipulating the feed's audio. Also included were a Zephyrus Electronics Ltd. model 101 rev. C demodulator ISA card for the WGN data stream, and a Great Valley Products Zorro II A2000 HC+8 Series II card (used only for 2 MB of Fast RAM with SCSI disabled). The 101C fed demodulated listings data at 2400 baud from a DE9 RS232 serial connector on its backpanel to the Amiga's stock DB25 RS232 serial port via a short cable. The 101C also featured connection terminals for contact closure triggering of external cable system video playback equipment.

=== 1990s ===
==== Prevue Channel ====
Prevue Channel used from 1993 to 1999

Beginning in late March 1993, Prevue Networks overhauled the Prevue Guide software, this time to modernize its appearance. Still operating on the same Amiga 2000 hardware, the old grid's black background with white text separated by colored lines gave way to a new, embossed-looking navy blue grid featuring 90 minutes of scheduling information for each channel. Triangular arrow symbols were added to listings of programs whose start or end times stretched beyond that timeframe (a single arrow indicating programs that started or concluded within the half-hour, and a double arrow denoting programs persisting at least 35 minutes earlier or later than the visible grid timeframe), and for viewer convenience, local cable operators could now configure the grid's scrolling action to momentarily pause for up to four seconds after each screenful of listings. Additionally, local cable operators could enable light grey sports and movie summaries within the grid. Appearing between each listings cycle, these showed all films and sporting events airing on any channel during the next 90 minutes.

The light grey program-by-program summaries for individual channels, red and light blue channel highlighting, and graphical "Prevue Weather" forecasts that were previously available to cable systems as optional grid features and inserts remained available in the same manners as before. Closed captioning, MPAA movie rating and VCR Plus+ icons were additionally introduced by this version of the software, and unlike in prior versions, large graphical Prevue Guide logos appeared within its grid as supplemental channel identification between listings cycles. Cable operators also retained the option of inserting scroll ads into the grid, although typically these were for promotional or informational purposes (i.e. information on how to place a PPV order), and could now be placed between channels in the grid. The old, synthesized interstitial music that had been used since 1988 was also replaced with a more modern piece called "Opening Act," from the defunct James & Aster music library.

By late 1993, Prevue Guide was rebranded as "Prevue Channel," and an updated channel logo was unveiled to match. Beginning in early 1994 and up until its first couple of years as the TV Guide Channel, the network licensed production music (first at one-minute lengths, later at 15- and 30-second lengths) from several music libraries for use as interstitial music. The vast majority of these music tracks were licensed from the Killer Tracks and FirstCom production music libraries, both of which are subsidiaries of Universal Music Publishing Group. In 1996, the Prevue Channel logo was given a new eye-like design, and two years later, the classic Dodger-style typeface its logo had incorporated since 1988 was replaced with an italicized lower-case Univers, though Sneak Prevue continued to use the original logo font until it shut down in 2002. In 1997, Prevue Channel became the first electronic program guide to show formalized TV ratings symbols for Canada and the United States, which appeared alongside program titles within the listings grid, as well as in the supplementary scheduling information overlaid accompanying promo videos in the top half of the screen.

During the mid-1990s, Prevue Networks also expanded beyond its Prevue Channel operation. In 1996, Prevue Networks introduced its first set top terminal-integrated digital IPG, Prevue Interactive, designed for the General Instruments DCT 1000. It was launched as part of Tele-Communications, Inc. (TCI)'s first digital cable service offerings. In 1997, Prevue Networks and United Video Satellite Group also launched Prevue Online, a website providing local television listings, audio/video interviews and weather forecasts. Another website, PrevueNet, was also launched to provide more history and useful information for the Prevue Channel, as well as for Sneak Prevue, UVTV, and superstations WGN/Chicago and WPIX/New York City.

The new navy blue grid version of the Prevue Channel software was as crash-prone as previous ones. Flashing red Amiga "guru meditation" errors (with the raw satellite feed's dual promo windows and national satellite listings grid showing through from behind them) remained a frequent sight on many cable systems throughout the United States and Canada. While Prevue Networks' software engineers released regular patches to correct bugs, it simultaneously became clear that an entirely new hardware platform would soon be needed. New Amiga 2000 hardware was no longer being manufactured due to its manufacturer Commodore filing for bankruptcy in 1994, and Prevue Networks began resorting to cannibalizing parts from second-hand dealers of used Amiga hardware in order to continue supplying and maintaining operational units. During periods where Amiga 2000 hardware availability proved insufficient, newer models such as the Amiga 3000 were used instead. However, as those models' stock cases would not accept the company's large existing inventory of Zephyrus ISA demodulator cards, only their motherboards were used, in custom-designed cases with riser card and backplane modifications. During this era, the cable MSO-owned satellite service PrimeStar carried the Prevue Channel, since unlike rivals DirecTV and Dish Network, it did not have an interactive program guide built into their receivers. Originally using the same Amiga-based setup as cable headends used, by 1997 it had changed to Prevue Jr., a Windows NT-based setup that lacked actual scrolling capabilities; by this time, five different Prevue variants were broadcast on PrimeStar to coincide with an expansion of PrimeStar's lineup. This setup remained in place until PrimeStar was acquired by DirecTV and shut down in 2000.

Final logo under the Prevue Channel branding, used from February 9, 1998 to January 31, 1999.

Towards the end of the decade, on February 9, 1998, Prevue Channel's look and programming was entirely revamped. Alongside a new logo and graphical look from design firm Pittard Sullivan, an expanded “wheel” segment schedule—similar to the scheduling structure utilized by Headline News and The Weather Channel at the time—was introduced, featuring regular short-form "shows" lasting one to two minutes in length and repeated each half-hour; while Intervue was not carried over to the new schedule in its existing or rebranded form, Prevue Tonight (now at the top and bottom of each hour (:00/:30)) and FamilyVue (now at :02/:32 after the hour) were rebranded as Prevue This and Prevue Family, respectively, and were refocused to highlight a single program of interest. Four new segments, meanwhile, were introduced: Prevue Sports (at :15/:45 after), a rundown of the day’s notable televised sporting events, and scheduled games and tournaments across various professional sports leagues and organizations; Prevue TV (at :17/:47 after), a segment focusing on television industry news and highlights of upcoming programs; Prevue News and Weather (at :25/:55 after), structured as two back-to-back 30-second segments, respectively featuring national and international news headlines supplied by Reuters, and current weather conditions and local forecasts; and Prevue Revue (at :26/:56 after), a spotlight on a selected movie available on pay-per-view, including star ratings of the film’s thematic and mature material. Local cable systems had the option of pre-empting Prevue TV in favor of airing additional programming promotions and commercials. During the Prevue Sports segment, the listings grid would shift down to the bottom quarter of the screen to allow more space for video content.

==== TV Guide Channel ====
On June 11, 1998, News Corporation sold TV Guide to Prevue Networks parent United Video Satellite Group for $800 million and 60 million shares of stock worth an additional $1.2 billion (this followed an earlier merger attempt between the two companies in 1996 that eventually fell apart). At midnight on February 1, 1999, the Prevue Channel was officially renamed "TV Guide Channel," and new graphics, again from Pittard Sullivan, were implemented. With the rebranding, the hourly segments featured on the channel were revamped, with some being retitled after features in TV Guide magazine – including TV Guide Close-Up (which profiled a select program airing that night), TV Guide Sportsview (which maintained the same format as Prevue Sports, making the segment more similar in format to the listings section's sports guide than the color column of that name in the magazine), and TV Guide Insider (a segment featuring behind-the-scenes interviews).

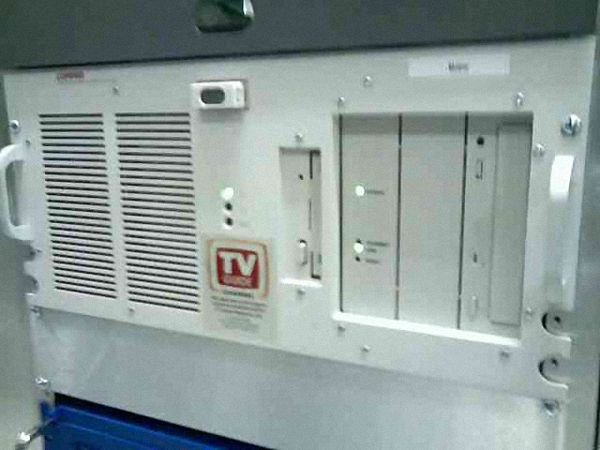
TV Guide Channel unit (WinNT PC-based)

On October 5, 1999, Gemstar International Group Ltd. purchased United Video Satellite Group. Finally, throughout December of that year on cable systems nationwide, a new, modernized yellow grid began replacing the navy blue grid that had presented channel listings to viewers for the past six years. The old navy blue grid was completely phased out by early January 2000. With the arrival of TV Guide Channel's yellow grid (referred to as "Hollywood" internally), all remaining vestiges of Prevue Channel had been eliminated: its Amiga-based hardware infrastructure was decommissioned, and purpose-built, Windows NT/2000 PCs employing custom-designed graphics/sound expansion cards were installed. With this new infrastructure additionally came the ability for local cable companies to perform silent remote administration of all their installations' locally customizable features, making live, on-screen guide maintenance interruptions by cable system technicians a thing of the past.

The yellow grid also eliminated the optional red and light blue background colors that local cable operators were previously able to assign to various channels of their choices. In their place, universal, program genre-based background colors were introduced. Sporting events appeared with green backgrounds, and movies on all networks were given red backgrounds. Pay-per-view events additionally appeared with purple backgrounds. The light grey backgrounds which had formerly appeared in channel- and program genre-based summaries were also eliminated, with the aforementioned red, green, and purple color-coding now applying to those summaries as well. Cable MSOs also gained the option to insert their logos alongside the TV Guide Channel logo at the beginning of every listings scroll. Other functions of the Amiga-based system, such as inserting messages within or after the listings scrolls and local weather forecasts, were carried over to the new system as well.

Despite its elimination as the branding for the cable channel, the Prevue brand continued to exist in Canada in the form of various Prevue Interactive services – most of which were simply rebranded versions of TV Guide Interactive products – as well as on the channel's pay-per-view barker service Sneak Prevue.

=== 2000s ===
TV Guide Channel with its second blue grid (2003–2004)

A few years after Prevue Channel completed its transition to TV Guide Channel, the programming it featured changed drastically. Full-length shows were added, moving away from the typical model of showing television previews and other information. Starting in 2005, Joan Rivers and her daughter Melissa Rivers began providing coverage for televised awards ceremonies such as the Emmy Awards and the Academy Awards. In 2007, the mother-daughter duo were unceremoniously dropped by TV Guide Channel in favor of actress/host Lisa Rinna. Later, in 2007, Rinna was joined by fellow Dancing with the Stars alumnus (and former N*SYNC member) Joey Fatone during awards coverage. On July 29, 2009, TV Guide announced that Rinna and Fatone had been replaced by the hosts of the channel's entertainment news program Hollywood 411, Chris Harrison (host of The Bachelor) and Carrie Ann Inaba (who serves as a judge on Dancing with the Stars).

Also with the transition from Prevue Channel to TV Guide Channel, the nature of the service's scrolling listings grid began to change. During broadcasts of the channel's original primetime series as well as during red carpet awards ceremony coverage, programming started appearing almost entirely full-screen, with a translucent, non-scrolling, two-line version of the channel's regular listings grid occupying only the extreme bottom of the frame. Semi-regular stylistic redesigns of the grid also occurred, and support was added for the display of locally inserted provider logos and graphical advertisements within it. Starting in 2004, light blue backgrounds began to appear on listings for children's programming, complementing the red, green and purple background colors already applied to listings for films, sporting events, and pay-per-view programming respectively.

Because of Gemstar-TV Guide's dominant position within the television listings market, listings for TV Guide Channel's own original programming began to appear on the topmost lines of most television listings websites to which the company provided listings data, regardless of which channel number any given cable system carried it on. This also became the case with the print version of TV Guide (which had first begun including the channel in its log listings upon the 1999 rebrand to TV Guide Channel, before moving it exclusively to the grids in 2004, where it remained after the magazine switched to national listings the following year).

Rather than purchasing TV Guide Channel carriage rights, some services such as Cablevision's Optimum and Bright House Networks created their own scrolling listings grids, with Optimum's occasionally being interrupted by full-screen commercials, and otherwise featuring banner ads accompanied by music. Bright House's version featured a video inlay of a local news station instead of banner ads, with its overall on-screen presentation otherwise matching that of Optimum's. Other cable providers that did not carry TV Guide Channel carried a similar television listings channel provided by entertainment and listings website Zap2It. DirecTV did not begin carrying the TV Guide Channel until 2004, and began carrying it in an entirely full-screen format (without the bottom listings grid) in 2005. This was also the case with Dish Network, which aired the network in full-screen format to avoid duplication of its set top receiver-integrated IPG, also provided by Gemstar-TV Guide (another satellite provider, Primestar, had also carried the channel with the grid included, until it merged with DirecTV in 1999 shortly after the rebrand to TV Guide Channel).

==== TV Guide Network ====
On April 30, 2007, Gemstar-TV Guide announced that beginning on June 4, 2007, TV Guide Channel would be rebranded as the "TV Guide Network". According to its press release, the move was intended to reflect "the continued evolution of the Channel from primarily a utility service to a more fully-developed television guidance and entertainment network with a continued commitment to high quality programming."

On May 2, 2008, Gemstar-TV Guide was acquired by Macrovision (now TiVo Corporation) for $2.8 billion. Macrovision, which purchased Gemstar-TV Guide mostly to boost the value of its lucrative VCR Plus+ and electronic program guide patents, later stated that it was considering a sale of both TV Guide Network and the TV Guide print edition's namesake to other parties. On December 18 of that year, Macrovision announced that it had found a willing party for TV Guide Network in private equity firm One Equity Partners. The transaction included tvguide.com, with Macrovision retaining the IPG service.

At the beginning of January 2009, the print edition of TV Guide quietly removed its listings for TV Guide Network (and several other broadcast and cable networks) over what the magazine's management described as "space concerns". In actuality, the two entities had been forced apart by their new, individual owners, with promotions for the network ending in the magazine, and vice versa. TV Guide magazine journalists also no longer appeared on TV Guide Network. The top-line "plug" for the network did, however, remain intact on the websites of internet-based listings providers using TV Guide's EPG listings. TV Guide Network's program listings returned to TV Guide magazine in June 2010, with its logo prominently placed within the grids.

On January 5, 2009, Lionsgate announced its intent to purchase TV Guide Network and TV Guide Online for $255 million in cash. Lionsgate closed the transaction on March 2, 2009. The following April, Lionsgate announced plans to revamp the network into a more entertainment-oriented channel, including plans to discontinue the bottom-screen scrolling program listings grid that has been a part of the channel since its inception in late 1981; this was partly because internet-based TV listings websites, mobile applications and the on-screen interactive program guides (IPGs) built directly into most modern cable and satellite set-top terminals (such as TV Guide's own IPG software, TV Guide Interactive, which is visually similar in its presentation to the channel's pre-2015 listings grid) as well as into digital video recorders like TiVo eliminated the need for a dedicated television listings channel by providing the same information in a speedier manner, and often in much more detail and with greater flexibility. Even so, the channels that were listed in the grid, long after many providers began offering digital cable service, were usually limited to those within their expanded basic tier, with only select channels on its digital service appearing in a separate grid towards the end of the listings cycle. Following the announcement, Mediacom announced that it would be dropping the network; Time Warner Cable also dropped the network from its Texas systems.

=== 2010s ===
TV Guide Network logo 2010-2013; 'Channel' was used on the bottom banner from 2007 until 2010.

On July 1, 2010, TV Guide Network's scrolling grid was given an extensive facelift; the grid was shrunk to the bottom one-quarter of the screen, the channel listings were reduced from two lines to one (with the channel number now being placed to the right of the channel ID code), the color-coding for programs of specific genres (such as children's shows, movies and sports) was removed, synopses for films were dropped and much like with the featured included in the Amiga 2000-generated grid, a four-second pause for the grid's scrolling function was added after each listed row of four channels. Despite the change, the non-scrolling grid (which was the same height as the restyled scrolling grid) continued to be used for primetime programming for a time. Later that month on July 24, TV Guide Network introduced a new non-scrolling grid used for primetime programming, which was later dropped with providers using the scrolling grid during the time period. On August 3, 2010, the scrolling grid was changed again, with the pausing function being applied to each channel, and size of the listing rows returning to two lines (in some areas, the grid with remained three lines, thus cutting off half of the second listing). On October 17, 2010, the color of the scrolling grid was changed to black the listing rows reverting to one line (although some cable systems still used the previous grid as late as 2014).

By May 2009, 35% of households carried the network's programming without the grid; by late 2011, 75% of the systems carrying the channel were showing its programming full-screen. By January 2013, that number increased to 83%, and it was expected that by the following year, 90% of households will be viewing the network in full-screen mode, without the grid listings. Some cable systems that abandoned use of the grid on TV Guide Network began moving the channel from their basic service (where it was carried at minimum on a "limited basic" programming tier, alongside local broadcast stations and public, educational, and government access channels) to their digital tiers. This also resulted in the phase-out of its use as a default Emergency Alert System conduit for transmitting warning information applicable to the provider's local service areas (some providers also previously used TV Guide Network's channel space for an alternate or overflow feed of a regional sports network for sports rights conflicts, though as dedicated HD channels have launched for the RSNs and new carriage agreements with the channel precluded EAS or RSN overflow use, this use was negated).

In 2011, TV Guide Network dramatically overhauled its programming, abandoning most of its original shows (with the exception of original specials and red carpet coverage) and switching its focus to reruns of programming primarily from the 1990s and 2000s, along with select 1980s series and films. In January 2012, upon Lionsgate's acquisition of film studio Summit Entertainment, it was announced that the channel was up for sale. That year, CBS Corporation considered buying the network. In March 2013, CBS and Lionsgate entered into a 50/50 joint venture to operate the network, to coincide with the former firm's intention to buy One Equity Partners' share of its other TV Guide interests. The deal, worth $100 million, closed on March 26, 2013.

==== TVGN ====
TVGN logo, used from 2013 to 2015

In January 2013, it was announced that TV Guide Network would be renamed TVGN. The name change and new logo, which de-emphasizes the channel's ties to TV Guide magazine took effect on April 15, 2013. The immediate effect of the purchase by CBS saw the summer series Big Brother: After Dark move from Showtime 2 to TVGN, along with same-day repeats of The Young and the Restless moving to the network from Soapnet, which ceased operations in December 2013. Fellow CBS soap The Bold and the Beautiful soon also joined the TVGN lineup, along with eventual same-week repeats of Survivor and The Amazing Race, and repeats of CBS event programming such as the Grammy Awards. CBS Television Distribution's syndicated newsmagazine Entertainment Tonight began to package and produce all of TVGN's red carpet coverage as a cable extension of that program, though the network's existing programming agreements with competing program/website PopSugar continue to be maintained.

A high-definition simulcast feed of the network (broadcasting in the 1080i format) was also launched that year; it was added to various providers through the renewals of TVGN's existing carriage contracts. The high definition feed only carries the channel's entertainment programming, with no overlays or hardware used to provide listings information. The final agreements with providers which specified that the channel carries a listings scroll ended in June 2014.

==== Pop ====
On September 18, 2014, CBS and Lionsgate announced that TVGN would be relaunched as Pop in early 2015, with the rebranding later announced to occur on January 14 of that year. with its focus shifting toward programming about pop culture fandom. The network would carry 400 hours of original programming following the rebrand, including a reality show starring New Kids on the Block and the Canadian co-production Schitt's Creek. Pop was made available on AT&T U-verse on March 1, 2016. On November 19, 2015, it was announced that Impact Wrestling, the flagship show of what was then known as TNA Wrestling, would move from Destination America to Pop beginning January 5, 2016. That series departed Pop at the start of 2019 for the Pursuit Channel after Pop declined to continue airing it.

In 2015, as part of Pop's transition from a barker channel to a pay TV channel, the purpose-built, Windows NT/2000 PCs employing custom-designed graphics/sound expansion cards from the TV Guide channel era were decommissioned, possibly due to TVGN's obsolescence as a barker channel.

On March 12, 2019, CBS acquired Lionsgate's 50% stake in Pop, thus making Pop a part of CBS Cable Networks. On December 4, 2019, CBS eventually merged with Viacom to create the combined company named ViacomCBS (now called Paramount Global), which Pop now became a part of the latter's existing networks unit.

== Program guide color schemes ==
=== Genre color-coding ===
TV Guide Network used various colors to differentiate different types of programming. Here, green indicates a NASCAR sports program while purple denotes a film, The Faculty.

On TV Guide Network until July 1, 2010, and currently in Gemstar-TV Guide's set top box-integrated EPG service TV Guide Interactive, program genres are indicated on-screen by color:

- General programming: Gray (displayed as dark blue in the EPG)
- Children's shows: Light blue
- Sports programming: Green
- Movies: Purple on pay-per-view channels; red on broadcast stations, basic and premium channels (displayed as purple in the EPG, for all channels)

On TVGN itself, during the weeks prior to the Emmys, shows that have been nominated were also highlighted in gold. The same gold highlighting could be seen during the lead-up to the Academy Awards to denote past Oscar-winning movies. Titles for other special programs used various types of graphical treatment within the grid cells; for example, programs aired as part of the Discovery Channel's Shark Week event had a bubbly water graphical scheme; during the lead-up to Halloween, horror movie titles featured spiderwebs in their schemes, and holiday movie titles listed during December were shaded in blue and snow-covered. Similar important shows and/or premieres have had other special graphical schemes added to their grid cells.

Due to a restructuring of TV Guide Network's scrolling grid on July 1, 2010, that saw the grid being shrunk to the lower third of the screen, grey began to be used as the color code for all programming with genre-based color-coding being relegated exclusively to the TV Guide Interactive IPG service.

=== Grid color history ===
On the TVGN channel, in its various iterations, the following colors have been used for the listings grid:

- Black (during the Amiga-based EPG and Prevue Guide years prior to mid-1993)
- Navy blue + Gray (during the Amiga-based Prevue Guide, Prevue Channel and TV Guide Channel years of 1993–2000)
- Yellow (during the TV Guide Channel years of 2000–2003)
- Blue (during the TV Guide Channel years of 2003–2004)
- Teal (during the TV Guide Channel years of 2004–2005)
- Grey (during the TV Guide Channel, TV Guide Network and TVGN years of 2005–2015)

Between the late 1980s and 1999, local cable operators could configure listings for certain channels to appear with alternate background colors (either red or light blue, depending the provider's preference). Light grey backgrounds were additionally used for channel- and program genre-based listings summaries, when enabled by local cable operators. Beginning with the introduction of the yellow grid in 1999, all such coloring was discarded in favor of program genre-based coloring which affected all channels and summaries. Listings for movies featured red backgrounds, pay-per-view events bore purple backgrounds, and sporting events featured green backgrounds. Starting in 2004, light blue backgrounds were additionally applied to listings for children's programming.

== Related services ==
=== Sneak Prevue ===
In 1991, Prevue Networks launched Sneak Prevue, a spin-off barker channel that was exclusively used to promote programming on a provider's pay-per-view services; it displayed full-screen promos (augmented by graphics displaying scheduling and ordering information) and a schedule of upcoming films and events airing on each pay-per-view channel based on either airtime or genre. The channel was also driven by Amiga 2000 hardware, and its software was as crash-prone as the Prevue Guide software itself. TV Guide Network ceased operations of Sneak Prevue in 2002.

=== TV Guide Network (Latin America) ===
TV Guide Network (Latin America) launched in 1995 as Prevue (Latin America), providing schedules for Spanish-language channels in the United States. On February 1, 1999, the channel was rebranded as TV Guide El Canal. In 2004, TV Guide El Canal rebranded to TV Guide Channel (Latino). In 2009, TV Guide Channel became TV Guide Network, which retained the name even after the sister channel's rebrand to Pop in 2014.
