= GuideWorks =

GuideWorks, LLC is the joint venture of Comcast and Gemstar-TV Guide International that was formed in April 2004 for the purpose of creating navigation software (also known as Interactive Program Guides) for digital cable television. Comcast owns a majority stake in the venture.

The software developed by GuideWorks is widely deployed in Comcast digital cable systems throughout the USA, and delivers both Video On Demand and Digital Video Recorder features to consumers. Gemstar TV Guide markets the GuideWorks software to other cable companies.

Prior to the formation of the joint venture, Gemstar-TV Guide International, Inc developed and marketed the navigation software to Comcast and other cable operators. During this period, the name i-Guide became associated with the products, which gained a reputation for strong promotion of advertising similar to the ads that appear on web pages today. This advertising aspect underwent significant deemphasis after the formation of the GuideWorks joint venture in 2004.

In 2010, Rovi, the corporate descendant of Gemstar-TV Guide, pulled out of the venture. GuideWorks is now wholly owned by Comcast.
