= SGNL =

- Also known as: SGNL by Sony
- Genre: documentary
- Presented by: Anthony Carboni; Olivia Speranza; Shannon Morse; Patrick Norton; Trace Dominguez; Jon Rettinger; Annie Gaus; Melody Akhtari; Amy Koppmann; Tara Long; Samia Khan
- Country of origin: United States
- Original language: English
- No. of seasons: 7
- No. of episodes: 170+

Production
- Running time: 2-10 minutes
- Production company: Revision3

Original release
- Network: Revision3, YouTube, iTunes

SGNL is a tech and gadget-centric web television show produced by Revision3 and sponsored by Sony Electronics. The show is in its third season, and is hosted by Anthony Carboni and Samia Khan. In addition to featuring the latest Sony gadgets, SGNL also highlights other Sony related content including music, movies, gaming, and entertainment. The show is available to watch online at Revision3's website, Sony.com/SGNL, and YouTube.com/SGNL. The SGNL app is built into many Sony products, including Blu-ray players and smart TVs, and an app is also available for download on both iPhone and Android devices.
