= Henry C. Yuen =

American businessman (born 1948)

Henry Che-Chuen Yuen (Chinese: 袁子春; born 7 April 1948, in Shanghai, China) is a founder and former CEO of Gemstar-TV Guide International. He has a PhD in applied mathematics from Caltech. He worked briefly at Caltech and New York University, then obtained a law degree from Loyola Law School.

He founded Gemstar in 1986. Called a "patent terrorist" for his aggressive litigation regarding the company's patent portfolio, he was also lauded as "the Bill Gates of TV", even negotiating a generous settlement with Microsoft for per-unit royalties and advertising revenue from Microsoft's WebTV and Ultimate TV set-top boxes. Commenting in 2001 on his approach to business, he remarked: "In business, where I am right now, the only rules that exist are the ones you make." After he merged Gemstar with TV Guide - he became notorious for constructing irrational and obscure business plans that had no relevance and relationship with the realities of the media business. He was fired from Gemstar in 2003, after the company revealed criminal manipulation of revenue recognition initiated by Yuen and other accounting problems. He was convicted of securities fraud in 2006, and ordered to pay $22 million in penalties. As of April 25, 2007, his whereabouts are unknown.
