= TrueCookPlus =

Microwave oven operating system

TrueCookPlus was a microwave oven operating system developed and patented by Microwave Science JV LLC. TrueCookPlus was endorsed by the National Frozen & Refrigerated Foods Association on behalf of over 1300 US frozen food industry member companies.

As of 2019, the website with all the TrueCookPlus codes, TrueCookPlus.com, is offline.

== Operation ==
TrueCookPlus utilizes short numeric codes to control cooking. After the user enters the code, the TrueCookPlus adjusts the cooking to conform to USDA Food Safety and Inspection Service standards for food type, weight, packaging size/shape and starting state; taking into account static microwave oven variables such as wattage, cavity size, wall voltage, hot or cold oven state, elevation above sea level and standing time. TrueCookPlus operated by utilizing short numeric cooking codes that were assigned to specific frozen food products.

== History ==
In 2008, the first TrueCookPlus licensed microwave ovens were launched in a limited national test market beginning at Best Buy in August, then Sears in September. During this test market phase, Consumer Reports selected the TrueCookPlus equipped Kenmore model #6633 as its #1 Top Rated mid-sized countertop microwave oven.

== See also ==
- Video recorder scheduling code
