= Barker channel =

Form of digital signage

A barker channel is a form of digital signage, operating in the form of a television channel that is entirely composed of sales promotion and advertising, usually marketing various features of the service carrying the channel. The name is derived from the circus barker, who stood outside a circus and shouted to passers-by to encourage them to enter to view the entertainment being provided by the attraction.

The systems are similar to character generators (CG), incorporating features such as motion graphics, and have the ability to play video clips controlled by broadcast automation systems.

== Overview ==
Several barker channels exist on digital cable systems, and especially on direct broadcast satellite systems such as DirecTV. On interactive television systems, these also allow for ordering of pay-per-view program selections or other pay television services. Prior to its 2008 purchase by Lions Gate Entertainment and subsequent conversion into a general entertainment channel (eventually leading to its rebranding as Pop in January 2015), the TV Guide Network – along with featuring listings for upcoming programs – functioned essentially as a barker channel with film and program descriptions. During its years as Prevue Guide/Channel, it served as a barker channel outright, incorporating video program promotions and short-form film trailers at the top half of the screen.

In its Prevue incarnation, the channel operated a sister barker service, Sneak Prevue, which provided information on pay-per-view programming along with ordering information, which utilized a commercial form of the consumer LaserDisc format for each provider to run video and purchase content airing over the channel; the service operated until 2002 (three years after its parent network evolved into the TV Guide Channel), as a result of the rise in in-house barker channels operated by pay-per-view services to promote their content.

Barker channels are normally free-to-view or occasionally free-to-air, even without a subscription; this also indicates success in the installation of satellite systems, and particularly in aiming small satellite dishes.

An example of a barker channel is the NBA League Pass Preview Channel, which is used to advertise and promote the NBA League Pass out-of-market sports package available to digital cable and satellite systems. In a technical form, specialty channels focused on a single sport such as NBA TV, NFL Network, NHL Network and MLB Network could be considered barkers, which may push devoted viewers into ordering those leagues' respective pay-per-view packages to watch complete game broadcasts.

In some occasions, the barker method is used on radio stations, looping 30 to 60 second messages leading to a pending format change, a process called "stunting". SiriusXM also contains an always-open barker channel encouraging a new vehicle buyer to activate a satellite radio subscription, and off-hours, its sports play-by-play channels carry a looping track promoting the channel locations of that day's games.

== See also ==
- Community bulletin board
- Local insertion
