= Hollywood 411 =

- Genre: Entertainment news and gossip
- Presented by: Chris Harrison

Original release
- Network: TV Guide Network
- Release: August 12, 2005

Hollywood 411 is an entertainment news and gossip television show that originally premiered on August 12, 2005, but later started on January 14, 2008, on the TV Guide Network and is hosted by Chris Harrison. The show was previously hosted by Madison Michele with guest hosts Marc Istook, Tanika Ray, and Rosanna Tavarez. The show includes celebrity interviews and previews of TV shows and movies.
