= Pop (American TV channel) =

American entertainment television channel

- Network logo since 2015
- Country: United States
- Broadcast area: Nationwide (available in most areas)
- Headquarters: New York City

Programming
- Language: English
- Picture format: 1080i (HDTV); 480i (SDTV)

Ownership
- Owner: Skydance Global Cable Media (MTV Entertainment Group)
- Parent: Skydance

History
- Launched: 1981; 45 years ago
- Former names: Electronic Program Guide (1981–88); Prevue Guide (1988–93); Prevue Channel (1993–99); TV Guide Channel (1999–2007); TV Guide Network (2007–13); TVGN (2013–15)

Links
- Website: www.poptv.com

Pop, commonly referred to as Pop TV (formerly known as Electronic Program Guide, Prevue Guide, Prevue Channel, TV Guide Channel, and TV Guide Network), is an American pay television channel owned by the MTV Entertainment Group unit of Skydance Global Cable Media, in turn a subsidiary of Skydance. It is a general entertainment channel, focusing primarily on programs pertaining to popular culture.

As of November 2023, Pop is available to approximately 60 million pay television households in the United States (down from its 2007 peak of 84 million households).

The American channel Pop TV is unrelated to any of the international channels having similar names (including the British television channels Pop and Tiny Pop (owned by Sony from 2014–21, then owned by Narrative Entertainment UK Limited since 2021), the Slovenian TV channel of the same name, or the Filipino channel of the same name).

== History ==
The network was originally launched in 1981 as a barker channel service providing a display of localized channel and program listings for cable television providers. Later on, the service, branded Prevue Channel or Prevue Guide and later as Prevue, began to broadcast interstitial segments alongside the on-screen guide, which included entertainment, news, and promotions for upcoming programs. After Prevue's parent company, United Video Satellite Group, acquired the entertainment magazine TV Guide in 1998 (UVSG itself would be acquired by Gemstar the following year), the service was then relaunched as TV Guide Channel (later TV Guide Network), featuring full-length programs dealing with the entertainment industry, including news magazines and reality shows, along with red carpet coverage from major award shows. TV Guide Network was acquired by Lionsgate in 2009, and programming began to shift towards a general entertainment format with reruns of dramas and sitcoms.

In 2013, CBS Corporation acquired a 50% stake in the network, and the network was renamed TVGN. At the same time, as its original purpose grew obsolete because of the integrated program guides offered by digital television platforms, the network began to downplay and phase out its program listings service; as of June 2014, none of the network's carriage contracts require the display of the listings, and they were excluded entirely from its high-definition simulcast.

On September 18, 2014, CBS and Lionsgate announced that TVGN (previously TV Guide Network) would be relaunched as Pop in early 2015, with the rebranding later announced to occur on January 14, 2015. The newly branded channel would shift toward programming about pop culture fandom and would carry 400 hours of original programming following the rebrand, including a reality show starring New Kids on the Block and the Canadian sitcom Schitt's Creek, the first program from Pop TV to receive Primetime Emmy Award nominations, including Outstanding Comedy Series.

Pop was made available on AT&T U-verse on March 1, 2016.

On March 12, 2019, CBS acquired Lionsgate's 50% stake in Pop, making Pop a part of CBS Cable Networks. It then became part of ViacomCBS Domestic Media Networks on December 4, 2019, when CBS merged with Viacom. Now under the latter's management, it was merged into Viacom's existing cable unit with corresponding job losses due to redundancies. As Viacom traditionally has their programming produced internally for their cable networks rather than from outside producers, second-season renewals for Flack and Florida Girls, along with a series order for Best Intentions were revoked, with Viacom freeing all three series to be shopped to other venues without penalty.

== Programming ==
Current programming seen on Pop includes a mix of procedural dramas, including ER, Scorpion, and series from the NCIS and Law & Order franchises, along with films. Original programming for the Pop TV channel was mostly discontinued after 2020, when the newly merged ViacomCBS (then Paramount Global) decided to focus more on their higher-profile brands. Previously, the network also aired professional wrestling from Total Nonstop Action/Impact Wrestling and the now-defunct Las Vegas-based Paragon Pro Wrestling promotion.
