= Private cable operator =

A private cable operator (PCO) is a private small independent cable company competing directly with Multi system operators (MSO). PCOs typically offer services to multi-family dwellings, gated communities, hotels and other small businesses. In some small municipalities in the city may be a PCO.

In some cases PCOs offer voice, wireless and data services as well. The U.S. Federal Communications Commission (FCC) currently has rules regarding the exclusive contracts that used to be granted to cable providers.
