= Video recorder scheduling code =

Code for easy scheduling of VCR recordings

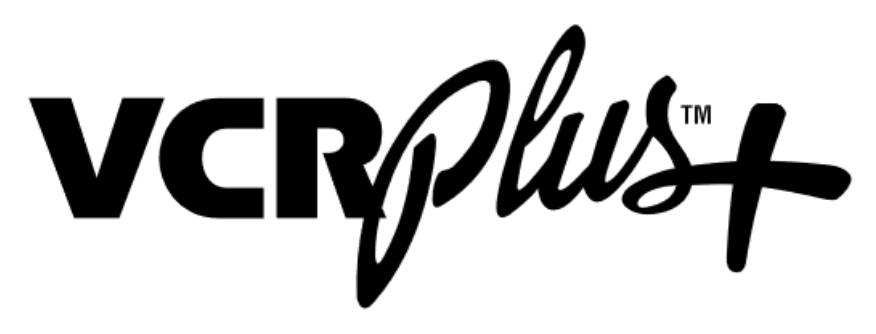
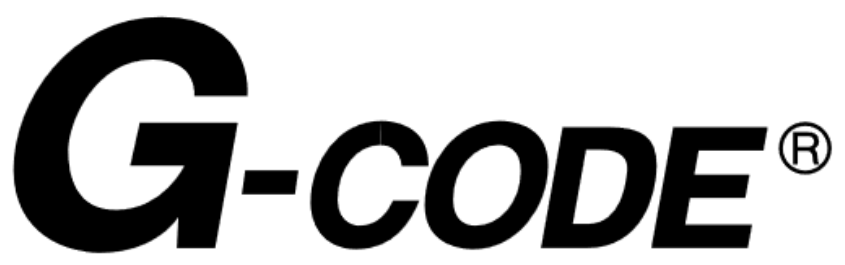
Brands used for the system

VCR Plus+, G-Code, VideoPlus+ and ShowView are different names for the same scheduling system for programming VCRs and digital video recorders. These names are all registered trademarks of Macrovision, whose corporate predecessor, Gemstar, developed these algorithms for use in integrated endecs.

This system was actively used for two decades, introduced in the late 1980s, with the last publication of а PlusCode in 2010.

== History ==
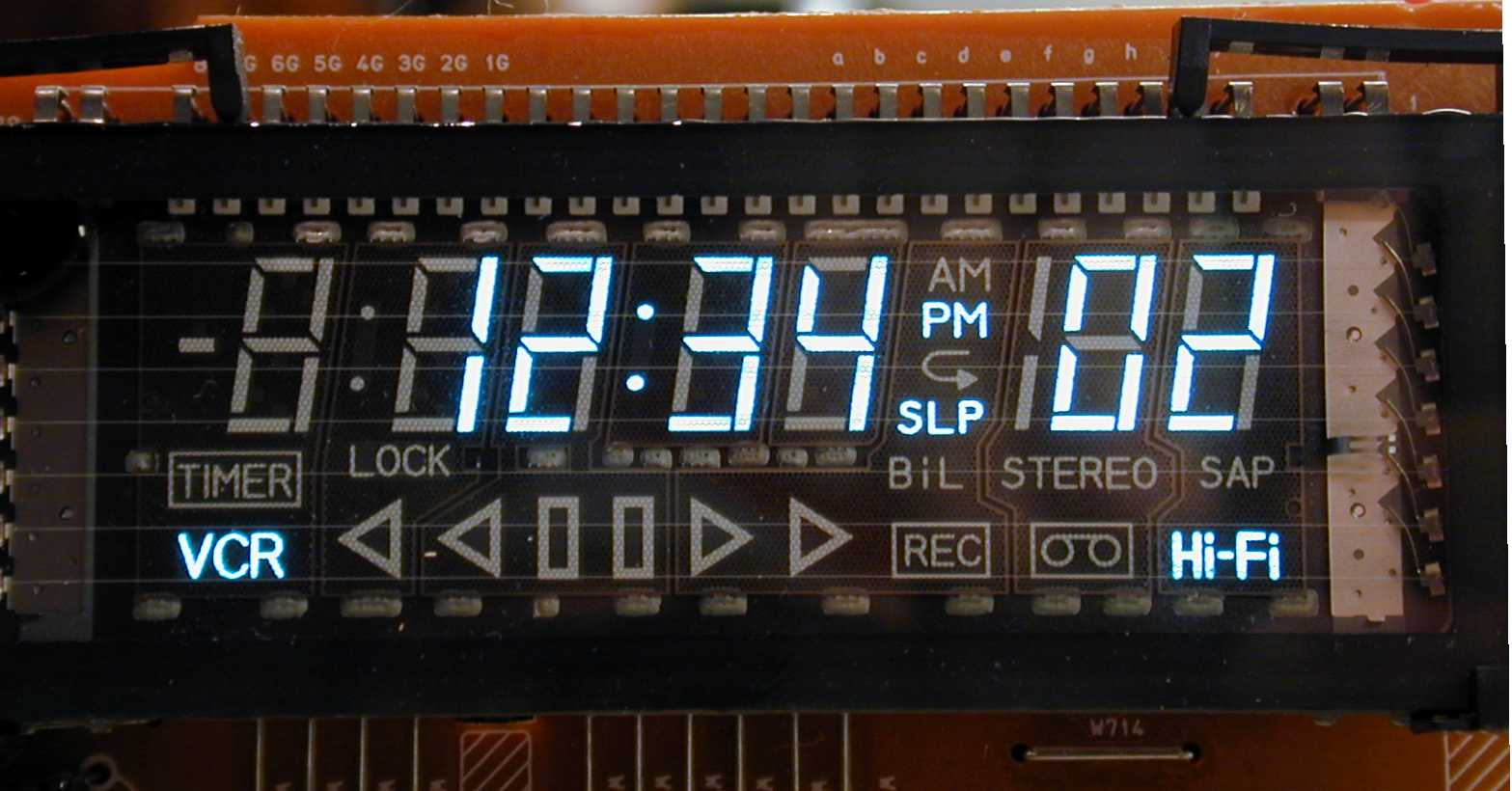
A full view of a typical vacuum fluorescent display (VFD) used in a videocassette recorder

Before the advent of on-screen displays, the only interface available for programming a home video recorder was a small VFD, LED or LCD panel and a small number of buttons. Correctly setting up a recording for a specific program was therefore a somewhat complex operation for many people. G-Code, VideoPlus+ and ShowView were intended to help remove this difficulty.

== Concept ==
The central concept of the system is a unique number, a PlusCode, assigned to each programme, and published in television listings in newspapers and magazines (such as TV Guide). To record a programme, the code number is taken from the newspaper and input into the video recorder, which would then record on the correct channel at the correct time. The code could also be entered into a dedicated remote control device that would then control the VCR. The number is generated by an algorithm from the date, time and channel of the programme; as a result, it does not rely on an over-the-air channel to serve as a conduit to ensure the recording is properly timed. This means it will not compensate for a disrupted schedule due to live sporting events or bulletins for breaking news events, however many video recorders with these systems also incorporate Programme Delivery Control (PDC) and use that to alter times if possible.

== Branding ==
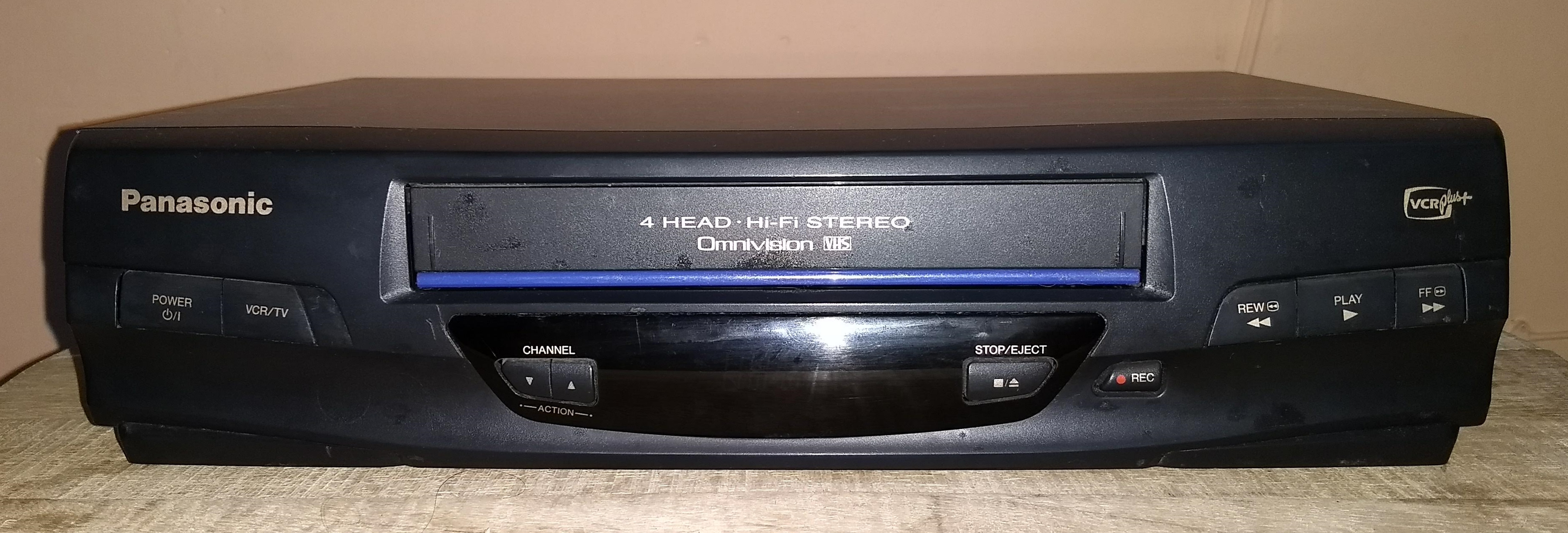
A Panasonic late-model VCR Omnivision Stereo 4-Head which supports VCRPlus+

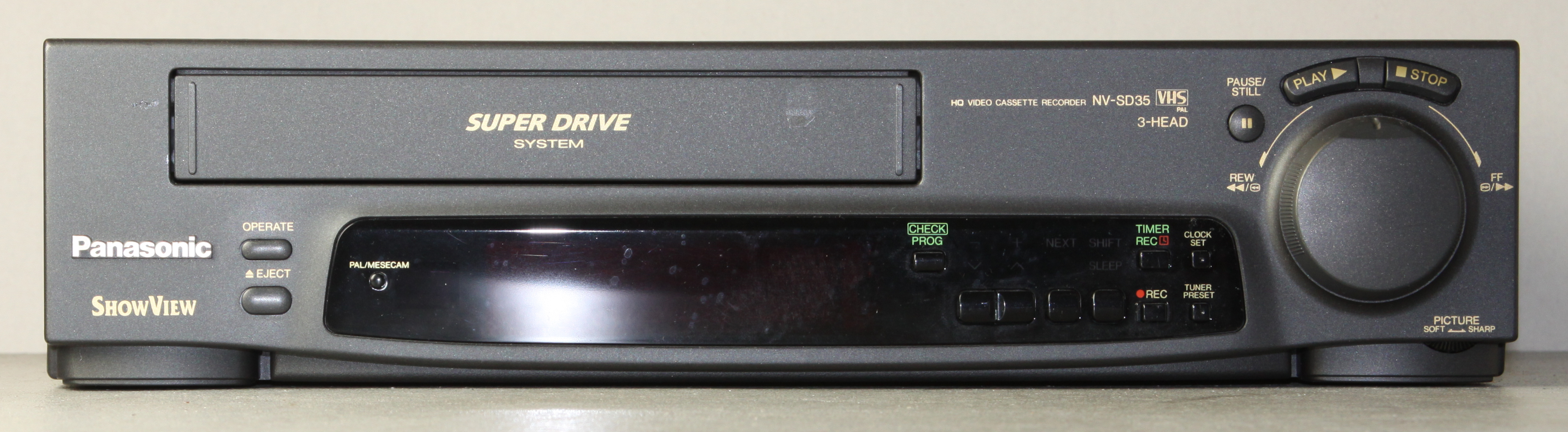
A 1994 Panasonic PAL/MESECAM VCR with ShowView branding (lower left corner)

The system has been licensed to television and VCR manufacturers in about 40 countries, but is branded under different names depending on the country. It is known as VCR Plus+, VCR Plus+ Silver and VCR Plus+ Gold in the United States and Canada; G-Code in Japan, China, New Zealand and Australia; VideoPlus+ in Ireland, the United Kingdom, and Japan; and ShowView in the rest of Europe as well as in South Africa. The system is branded as VideoPlus+/ShowView in Europe due to an existing trademark registration for "VCR" by Philips on that continent, and as G-Code (the "G" standing for the system's developer, Gemstar) in Japan because VCR is not a common abbreviation there ("VTR," for videotape recorder, is used instead). Japan initially used the name VideoPlus+ and later changed to G-Code, an example of this is the Victor (JVC) HR-880. Because television programming schedules are different, the coding has to be adjusted in each of the regions and recording equipment is not interchangeable.

== Algorithms ==
The algorithms used to encode and decode the television guide values from and to their time representations were published in 1992, but only for codes with six or fewer digits.

Source code for seven and eight digit codes was written in C and Perl and posted anonymously in 2003.

== See also ==
- TrueCookPlus, a similar system for microwave oven cooking
