= Gemstar–TV Guide International =

Defunct American media company

Gemstar–TV Guide International, Inc.
- Formerly: United Video Satellite Group, Inc., Trakker, Inc., Prevue Networks, Inc.
- Type: Public
- Traded as: Nasdaq: GMST
- Industry: Electronic and print media
- Founded: 1978; 48 years ago
- Defunct: 2008; 18 years ago
- Fate: Merged with Macrovision Solutions Corporation
- Headquarters: Tulsa, Oklahoma, United States
- Area served: United States
- Products: Interactive program guide Video recorder scheduling codes Magazines; Cable television

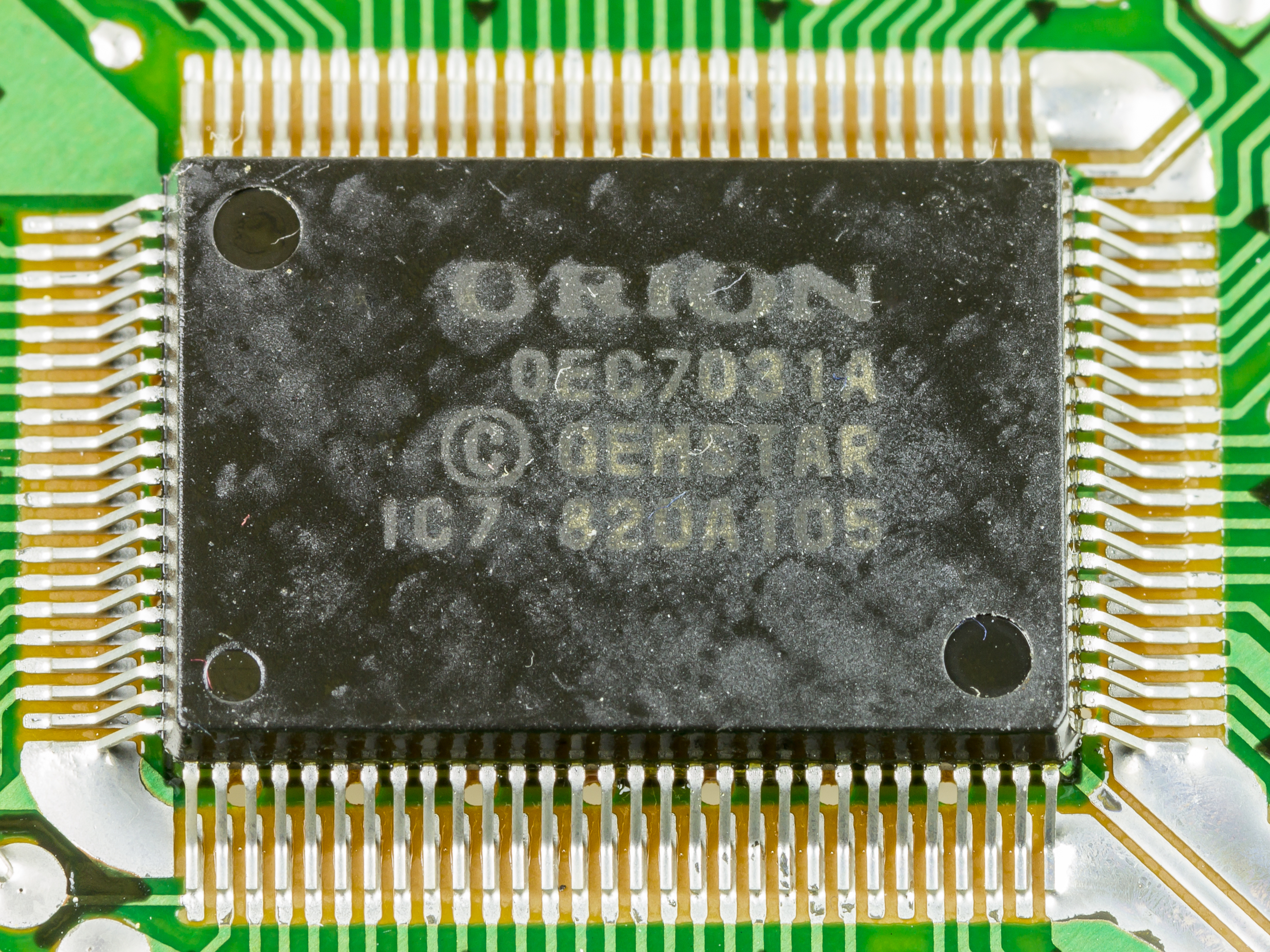
An integrated circuit with Gemstar technology

Gemstar–TV Guide International, Inc. was a media company that licensed interactive program guide technology to multichannel video programming distributors such as cable and satellite television providers, and consumer electronics manufacturers; video recorder scheduling codes under brands such as VCR Plus; as well as serving as publishers of TV Guide magazine, operators of tvguide.com, owners of TV Guide Network and TVG Network, and providing various related services. On May 2, 2008, Gemstar–TV Guide International, Inc. became a wholly owned subsidiary of Macrovision Solutions Corporation, which later changed its name to Rovi Corporation on July 16, 2009.

== History ==
=== As United Video ===
In 1978, United Video Satellite Group, Inc. was founded in Tulsa, Oklahoma. United Video itself dated back to 1965, founded by Gene Schneider, and was originally a cable company in the Tulsa area, originally under the names of GenCo and then LVO Cable (during a period when they were owned by LVO Corporation, an oil company). The name United Video came from an acquisition in 1970: a small, microwave-based TV relay operation serving the Illinois towns of Ottawa, Streator and Pontiac with TV signals from Chicago. The microwave business expanded to serve other cable companies and regions, including Iowa, Louisiana, and Oklahoma itself, carrying distant stations to rural communities.

Thanks to their experience in distributing Chicago's WGN-TV via microwave, they were chosen to distribute WGN's signal nationwide via satellite uplink (after a period where UV competed with several other firms, including another Tulsa-based uplink firm, Southern Satellite Systems). They began uplinking the signal from a facility in Monee, Illinois, to the Satcom-3 satellite on November 9, 1978. Soon, several other stations began to be uplinked for national distribution by UVSG, including WGN's then-sister station WPIX in New York, KTVT in Dallas, and KPLR in St. Louis. (With the rise of satellite, this meant that microwave transmission of distant stations was now outmoded, with UVSG selling their microwave systems by 1980.)

A side venture was the Satellite Music Network, formed in 1981; the concept came about when UV employee Al Stem pointed out that the satellite bandwidth used for their superstation uplinks still left considerable amounts of bandwidth open for other usage. In less than three years, the service had more than 300 affiliates. SMN was sold to Capital Cities/ABC Inc. for a stock deal worth approximately $55 million on January 10, 1989; Capital Cities/ABC had purchased a minority stake in the company in the days prior. By the time of the purchase, SMN boasted over 1,050 affiliates for nine distinct formats throughout the United States. The deal closed at the end of July, with SMN's operations folded into the original ABC Radio Networks, and through subsequent mergers and divestitures is now a part of the current Westwood One under Cumulus Media. The sale of SMN also ultimately led to the development of SpaceCom, a separate company which handled satellite data transmission, including data for pagers.

Another side venture formed from the idea of carrying something over their main signal was the Electronic Program Guide, also created in 1981. A simplistic setup, UVSG sent raw program listings data for national cable networks, as well as for regional and local broadcast stations, disseminated from a central computer in Tulsa and transmitted to each EPG installation (a computer supplied by United Video based in a local cable headend; the computer itself would typically be an Atari model, like the 130XE or 600XL, running from a 16KB EPROM chip) via a 2400 baud data stream on an audio subcarrier of WGN by United Video. At the time, local cable television was still massively spreading across the nation from 3,070 systems in 1981 to 4,300 systems in 1991. Each day's programming lineup was transmitted from phone lines to its Chicago Teleport base (with an estimate 2,400 characters per second and an estimate 10 hours to relay) before the EPG's lineup was beamed to a satellite and distributed to cable companies and systems throughout the nation. The cable viewer at home would see a computer-generated, scrolling listings screen, featuring audio simulcasts of either a local radio station or a satellite-delivered music channel (used in later years on some systems). By viewership, cable subscribers with EPG grew from 5,300,000 viewers in 1986 to 7,000,000 viewers in 1987. The Electronic Program Guide, or simply EPG, had several updates ensued over the next few years, which would later culminate in a rebrand as the Prevue Guide in April 1988 (and a further one to the Prevue Channel in 1993); by this time, the Atari-based guide had been replaced with an Amiga-based system, while some systems retained the Atari-based guide into as late as 1996. Prevue ultimately proved to be more of a money-maker than WGN and the other superstations were, leading to UVSG going public in 1993. Two years later, TCI bought a stake in the company, which at this point had 1,400 employees and made $400 million in revenue a year.

=== As Gemstar–TV Guide International ===
On October 5, 1999, Gemstar International Group Ltd. (which was founded by Henry Yuen, Daniel Kwoh, Louise Wannier and Wilson Cho) purchased TV Guide, Inc. (formerly United Video Satellite Group until after the close of the company's 1998 purchase of TV Guide magazine); the two companies had previously been involved in a legal battle over the intellectual property rights for their respective interactive program guide systems, VCR Plus+ and TV Guide On Screen, a joint venture of TV Guide and Liberty Media formed by video game veteran Bruce Davis in 1992. The deal was completed in July 2000.

In 2000, SoftBook was acquired by Gemstar, who also acquired Softbook's competitor, the Rocket eBook), and merged them into the Gemstar eBook Group and released an e-reader called the RCA eBook Reader.

Gemstar had inherited much of its patent portfolio through its 1997 acquisition of StarSight Telecast, which had previously litigated against companies such as General Instrument and Scientific Atlanta. StarSight Telecast had reportedly settled its ongoing disputes with Scientific Atlanta in 1997, entering into a licensing arrangement and marketing relationship, accepting an initial licensing payment. The company eventually prevailed in its licensing dispute with General Instrument in 1999, although an injunction was denied on the basis that General Instrument had not infringed the relevant patents in any commercial products.

Gemstar's initial agreement with Scientific Atlanta expired in 1999, leading to various legal proceedings. Already in December 1998, Scientific Atlanta had filed a legal action alleging that Gemstar had violated federal antitrust laws and had misused its patents, seeking damages and judgements of non-infringement related to a number of Gemstar's patents. A declaration of invalidity was sought for eight patents in particular. Following up in 1999, Scientific Atlanta sued Gemstar's StarSight Telecast subsidiary for patent infringement. Such disputes also involved the International Trade Commission, with Scientific Atlanta seeking a declaration of invalidity and non-infringement of two StarSight patents. Gemstar responded in 1999 with a filing claiming patent infringement on imported set-top box products by Scientific Atlanta, Pioneer Corporation, Echostar Communications Corporation and SCI Systems, along with a patent infringement lawsuit against the former three companies. Pioneer and EchoStar settled with Gemstar during the course of the ITC proceedings, which ultimately led to a settlement between Gemstar and Scientific Atlanta in 2005.

In 2002, Gemstar disclosed that it had not collected $108 million in booked revenue. The genesis of the uncollected revenue stemmed from expired licensing agreements, mainly with cable set-top box manufacturer Scientific Atlanta. Yuen and Gemstar chief financial officer Elsie Leung had been booking the revenue for over a year, as they believed Generally Accepted Accounting Practices allowed them to do this as Scientific Atlanta was continuing to add the company's interactive program guide software to its set-top boxes; the companies were also simultaneously in ongoing litigation and negotiations to resolve their disputes. As Scientific Atlanta had always compensated the company in the past, Gemstar, Yuen and Leung had reasonable evidence that the uncollected revenue would eventually be collected. When the amount accrued to a much larger sum of over $100 million, the company disclosed the information in a quarterly conference call with media and investors.

During this time period, News Corporation purchased shares in Gemstar that were owned by Liberty Media (a multimedia company owned by John Malone), giving News Corporation owner Rupert Murdoch control of the company. Yuen was replaced as chief executive officer in October 2002 by Jeff Shell, an employee of Murdoch's who had been running the Fox Cable Networks Group. Following continuing losses in the hundred million dollar range, including charges related to shareholder litigation, Gemstar's market capitalization fell. From a high of $20 billion in 2000, during a period of high valuations of high-tech stocks, it had fallen to a low of little more than $1 billion in 2005, later recovering somewhat. In early 2007, Gemstar acquired Aptiv Digital, the developer of the Passport interactive program guide software used on Scientific Atlanta and Motorola set-top boxes.

On July 9, 2007, Gemstar chairman Anthea Disney announced that its board of directors has "authorized the Company and its advisors to explore strategic alternatives intended to maximize shareholder value, which may include a sale of the Company." This move was seen by many analysts as an attempt on the part of Murdoch, who was a 41% shareholder in Gemstar, to raise cash for its attempt to buy Wall Street Journal parent company Dow Jones.

On December 7, 2007, Gemstar signed a definitive agreement to be acquired by Macrovision (later Rovi Corporation, now Xperi Inc.) in a cash and stock deal, which based on the closing price for the Macrovision stock on December 6, 2007, was valued at approximately $2.8 billion. The deal closed on May 2, 2008.

On November 27, 2009, Virgin Media succeeded in a patent dispute brought against it by Gemstar–TV Guide. The London High Court found that Virgin Media had infringed on patents EP 0969662, EP 1377049 and EP 1613066, but also found them to be invalid and moved to revoke them. The ruling called into question the ability for Rovi to enforce its patents both in the United Kingdom and with operators around the world. Rovi Corporation appealed against the decision for two of the three patents and continued to pursue Virgin Media for infringement of intellectual property. However, on March 29, 2011, the Court of Appeal of England and Wales upheld the original decision.

Virgin Media has successfully defended claims by Rovi and Patent 11 has been revoked. Rovi has been ordered by the Court of Appeal to reimburse Virgin Media's legal costs.

Rovi Corporation continues to execute and license its patents including patents from Gemstar–TV Guide to companies worldwide (including those based in the United Kingdom); in particular, in 2010 deal, the company signed a deal with Sky to license the company's IPG patents.
