= Tamora Pierce bibliography =

This is a list of works by American fantasy author Tamora Pierce.

== Works ==
=== Tortall universe ===
The Tortall universe is a fictional setting shared by six book series: [The] Song of the Lioness; [The] Immortals, or Wild Magic; Protector of the Small; Daughter of the Lioness, or Tricksters; and Beka Cooper (Provost's Dog); the Numair Chronicles, as well as multiple short stories.

Setting

The Tortall series is named for the country in which the majority of the works are set, Tortall. The capital of Tortall is Corus, located near the western coast on the Emerald Ocean. To the north is Scanra, a wild and somewhat barbaric country. Tortall and Scanra are at war in the last two Protector books and the first Trickster book, Trickster's Choice. To the east are Galla, Tusaine, and Tyra, and past them are Maren and Sarain. Carthak (setting for Emperor Mage) is south of Tortall across the Inland Sea, while to the west lie the Yamani Islands and the Copper Isles. To the east of Maren and Sarain is The Roof of the World, a large mountain range. The Trickster books mostly take place in the Copper Isles, further south than the Yamani islands.

The Hunt Records take place hundreds of years before the other books, and Barzun, a nation between Tortall and the Inland Sea later is occasional mentioned. Barzun was later conquered by Tortall.

Tortall is a place somewhat reminiscent of the European Middle Ages, with its monarchy, court, nobility, and knights, but is otherwise a completely different world. Magic is very real and practical to Tortallans, from the common hedgewitch to the King's court mages. Deities are revered and often play a part in human lives, sometimes choosing humans as champions, sometimes using them to further their own purposes. Though these deities are shown as powerful beyond belief, they rely on their human instruments to shape the world.

==== The Song of the Lioness ====
The Song of The Lioness was originally written as one single book for adults, but Pierce's literary agent suggested that she rewrite it into four books aimed at a young adult audience.

- Alanna: The First Adventure (1983)
- In the Hand of the Goddess (1984)
- The Woman Who Rides Like a Man (1986)
- Lioness Rampant (1988)
- The omnibus edition of this quartet is Song of the Lioness, published in 2002 by Science Fiction Book Club (SFBC).

==== The Immortals ====
- Wild Magic (1992)
- Wolf-Speaker (1994)
- Emperor Mage (1994)
- The Realms of the Gods (1996)
- The omnibus edition is The Immortals (SFBC, 2003).

==== Protector of the Small ====
- First Test (1999)
- Page (2000)
- Squire (2001)
- Lady Knight (2002)
- The omnibus edition is Protector of the Small (SFBC, 2004). A 2014 reissue includes "Bone's Day Out" (2014), a Tortall short story unique to this edition.

==== Tricksters ====
Also called Daughter of the Lioness from the Song of the Lioness four-book series. This duology is the same length as the earlier quartets, because the books are about twice the length of the earlier works. Pierce explains that the success of the Harry Potter books finally showed publishers that young readers will read long books.

- Trickster's Choice (2003)
- Trickster's Queen (2004)
- The omnibus edition is Tricksters (2005)

==== Beka Cooper: The Hunt Records ====
This trilogy is also called Provost's Dog. It is set 200 years before Alanna: The First Adventure. It was a finalist for the 2012 Mythopoeic Fantasy Award for Children's Literature.

- Terrier (2006)
- Bloodhound (2009)
- Mastiff (2011)
- The omnibus edition is Beka Cooper: The Hunt Records (2012)

==== The Numair Chronicles ====
The Numair Chronicles will be a two-book series about the childhood of Arram Draper, who will grow up to be the Great Mage, Numair Salmalín.

- Tempests And Slaughter (2018)

==== Tortall and Other Lands: A Collection of Tales ====
- Tortall and Other Lands: A Collection of Tales (2010) contains multiple short stories set in the Tortall Universe. It is a collection of all Tamora Pierce's short stories and contains all of those written as of its publication in 2010, with the exception of Slippery in the Stairwell, 1965 (2009) For a complete listing see the Short Stories section.

==== A Spy's Guide to Tortall: From the Desk of George Cooper ====
- A Spy's Guide to Tortall: From the Desk of George Cooper (2017). By Julie Holderman, Tamora Pierce, Megan Messinger, Timothy Liebe, and Cara Coville: A collection of documents from within the realms of Tortall. There will be an array of new information about the country and characters, immortals never seen in the books, and everything from a breakdown of the Tortallan military to personal correspondence. Features everything from Queen's Riders recruitment material, to a detailed account of the sealing of the Divine Realms, to correspondence about the minor adventures of major characters. It will also include the story of Aly's first mission – and the reason her parents refused to let her go on any others – along with illustrations of characters and "personnel files" kept by the Whisper Man himself

==== Chronological order of all Tortall books and short stories ====
As some series and short stories are prequels, the chronologic order differs from publication order. Books that were published later frequently mention characters from books that were published earlier. However, each quartet or series can be read independently of the others.

1. Terrier (2006) – Beka Cooper: The Hunt Records #1, Tortall #15
2. Bloodhound (2009) – Beka Cooper: The Hunt Records #2, Tortall #16
3. Mastiff (2011) – Beka Cooper: The Hunt Records #3, Tortall #17
4. "Student of Ostriches" (2005) – novelette (2005 in Young Warriors: Stories of Strength; 2010 in Tortall and Other Lands)
5. Tempests and Slaughter (2018) - The Numair Chronicles #1, Tortall #19
6. The Exile's Gift (Forthcoming) – Exile±
7. Exile 3 (Forthcoming) – Exile±
8. Alanna: The First Adventure (1983) – Song of the Lioness #1, Tortall #1
9. In the Hand of the Goddess (1984) – Song of the Lioness #2, Tortall #2
10. The Woman Who Rides Like a Man (1986) – Song of the Lioness #3, Tortall #3
11. Lioness Rampant (1988) – Song of the Lioness #4, Tortall #4
12. Wild Magic (1992) – The Immortals #1, Tortall #5
13. Wolf-Speaker (1994) – The Immortals #2, Tortall #6
14. Elder Brother (2001) – novelette (2001 in Half Human; 2001 in Books One and Two: Water and Fire; 2010 in Tortall and Other Lands)
15. "Hidden Girl" (2006) – novelette (2006 in Dreams and Visions; 2010 in Tortall and Other Lands)
16. Emperor Mage (1995) – The Immortals #3, Tortall #7
17. The Realms of the Gods (1996) – The Immortals #4, Tortall #8
18. First Test (1999) – Protector of the Small #1, Tortall #9
19. Page (2000) – Protector of the Small #2, Tortall #10
20. Squire (2001) – Protector of the Small #3, Tortall #11
21. Lady Knight (2002) – Protector of the Small #4, Tortall #12
22. "Bone's Day Out" (2014) -short story (2014 in Protector of the Small omnibus)±
23. A Spy's Guide to Tortall: From the Desk of George Cooper (2017) Tortall #18 ±
24. Trickster's Choice (2003) – Tricksters: Daughter of the Lioness #1, Tortall #13
25. Trickster's Queen (2004) – Tricksters: Daughter of the Lioness #2, Tortall #14
26. "Nawat" (2010) – novella (2010 in Tortall and Other Lands)
27. "Lost" (2010) – novelette (2010 in Tortall and Other Lands)±
28. The Dragon's Tale (2009) – Tortallan Novelette (2009 in The Dragon Book; 2010 in Tortall and Other Lands)

± Location in timeline uncertain

=== Circle universe ===
Setting The Circle of Magic quartet is set in the land of Emelan; the Circle Opens quartet and the Circle Reforged quartet are set in Emelan and various neighbouring countries. Neighboring countries include Sotat (east of Emelan; birthplace of Briar Moss), Qalai (north-east of Emelan), Lairan (north of Emelan), Gansar (north-west of Emelan), and Anderann (west of Emelan, birthplace of Dedicate Rosethorn). Other countries in the Circle universe include Chammur (setting of Street Magic), Thairos (setting of Shatterglass), Namorn (far north, setting of Cold Fire and The Will of the Empress), Gyongxe (setting of Battle Magic), Yanjing (birthplace of Evumeimei Dingzai) Capchen (birthplace of Trisana Chandler), the Battle Islands (setting of Melting Stones), Hatar Island in the Pebbled Sea, Olart (north of the Pebbled Sea), and Mbau (south of the Pebbled Sea).

In the Circle universe, magic is common and regularly used, but individuals need to be born with the ability to use it. There are two forms of magic. Academic magic is directly linked to the energy within the user and may require incantations or physical catalysts. Ambient magic is less common, is associated with a certain craft (such as carpentry) or item of nature (such as lightning), and involves power from the surroundings flowing through the user. Most cultures in the Circle universe are polytheistic, but unlike the Tortall universe, gods less frequently try to affect mortal events.

==== Circle of Magic ====
Plot The series tells the stories of four 10-year-old children: Sandrilene fa Toren, Trisana Chandler, Daja Kisubo and Briar Moss, known as Sandry, Tris, Daja, and Briar, respectively. They are discovered in various troubled circumstances and brought together by Niklaren Goldeye (referred to as Niko), a powerful mage, who tells them that they are "ambient mages," which means that they use magic derived from the environment. The four youths do not fit in with the other children of the monastic Winding Circle community to which Niko brings them and are put together in a separate cottage, called Discipline. Here they each learn of their hidden talents: Sandry with thread, Tris with weather, Daja with fire and metal, and Briar with plants. Lark, a gentle woman especially attentive to Sandry since she also has thread magic, and Rosethorn, a sharp woman who shares Briar's ability with plants, live with and instruct the children in their magical and personal growth. Also teaching and guiding them is Niko, technically Tris's teacher, but available to all four. Daja is taught by Dedicate Initiate Frostpine, a smith mage. At first it seems that a merchant, a street rat, a noblewoman, and a Trader (a trading race that is often hated by others) will never get along, but an extraordinary circumstance brings them together. Through an earthquake, they realize their full potential and are bound closely together forever. As children skilled in uncommon magics, they struggle to earn the respect of the adults they encounter and to fully understand and control their magical powers. Nominated for the 2000 Mythopoeic Fantasy Award for Children's Literature

- Sandry's Book, UK title The Magic in the Weaving (1997)
- Tris's Book, UK title The Power in the Storm (1998)
- Daja's Book, UK title The Fire in the Forging (1998)
- Briar's Book, UK title The Healing in the Vine (1999)

Compilations

- Water & Fire (2001): Circle of Magic # 1-2, and short story Elder Brother (Tortall)
- Air & Earth (2003): Circle of Magic # 3-4
- The Omnibus edition is Circle of Magic Quartet
- Chapters from Sandry's Book are also found in Tamora Pierce: Enter the Circle, a Scholastic books promotional sampler.

==== The Circle Opens ====
The young mages, now 14 years old, are officially certified by Winding Circle and become teachers. In this quartet, each of the four protagonists travels with their mentor, taking on a new student and combating problems abroad.

- Magic Steps (2000)
- Street Magic (2001)
- Cold Fire (2002)
- Shatterglass (2003)
- The omnibus edition is The Circle Opens
- Chapters from Magic Steps are also found in Tamora Pierce: Enter the Circle, a Scholastic books promotional sampler.

==== The Circle Reforged ====
- The Will of the Empress (2005)
- Melting Stones (2008) (first released as an audiobook in 2007)
- Battle Magic (2013)
- Unlikely forthcoming book featuring Tris due to Scholastic's lack of interest

==== Chronological order of all Circle Universe books ====
1. Sandry's Book (1997) – Circle of Magic #1, Emelan #1
2. Tris's Book (1998) – Circle of Magic #2, Emelan #2
3. Daja's Book (1998) – Circle of Magic #3, Emelan #3
4. Briar's Book (1999) – Circle of Magic #4, Emelan #4
5. Magic Steps (2000) – The Circle Opens #1, Emelan #5
6. Street Magic (2001) – The Circle Opens #2, Emelan #6
7. Cold Fire (2002) – The Circle Opens #3, Emelan #7
8. Shatterglass (2003) – The Circle Opens #4, Emelan #8
9. Battle Magic (2013) – The Circle Reforged #3, Emelan #11
10. The Will of the Empress (2005) – The Circle Reforged #1, Emelan #9
11. Melting Stones (2008) – The Circle Reforged #2, Emelan #10
12. Untitled Tris Book (Forthcoming) – The Circle Reforged #4, Emelan #12

=== Short stories ===
==== Complete list ====
- Plain Magic (1986) – A fantasy short story. (1986 in Planetfall; 1999 in Flights of Fantasy; 2010 in Tortall and Other Lands)
- Testing (2000) – A contemporary novelette based on events that happened to the author while she was the housemother in a group home for teenage girls. (2000 in Lost and Found: Award-Winning Authors Sharing Real-Life Experiences Through Fiction; 2010 in Tortall and Other Lands)
- Elder Brother (2001) – A Tortall novelette (2001 in Half Human; 2001 in a two-in-one Circle of Magic book titled Books One and Two: Water and Fire; 2010 in Tortall and Other Lands)
- Student of Ostriches (2005) – A Tortall novelette about Kylaia al Jmaa (the future Shang Unicorn) from Lioness Rampant. (2005 in Young Warriors: Stories of Strength; in 2010 in Tortall and Other Lands)
- Huntress (2006) – A contemporary fantasy novelette (2006 in Firebirds Rising: An Anthology of Original Science Fiction and Fantasy; 2010 in Tortall and Other Lands)
- Hidden Girl (2006) – A Tortall novelette set in the same country as "Elder Brother". (2006 in Dreams and Visions: Fourteen Flights of Fantasy; 2010 in Tortall and Other Lands)
- Time of Proving (2006) – A medieval fantasy short story, about the coming of age of a young girl. (2006 in Cricket; 2010 in Tortall and Other Lands; 2011 The Realm of Imagination: Favorite Stories from Cricket Magazine)
- The Dragon's Tale (2009) – A Tortall short story about Kitten (Skysong), Daine's dragon (2009 in The Dragon Book: Magic Tales from the Master of Modern Fantasy; 2010 in Tortall and Other Lands)
- Slippery in the Stairwell, 1965 (2009) – A contemporary, real-life short story in an anthology of first period stories. (2009 in My Little Red Book)
- Lost (2010) – A Tortall novelette about a girl from Tusaine and a darking. (2010 in Tortall and Other Lands)
- Mimic (2010) – A fantasy novelette about a girl named Ri and the animals she saves. (2010 in Tortall and Other Lands)
- Nawat (2010) – A Tortall novella which takes place after the Trickster series. (2010 in Tortall and Other Lands)
- Bone's Day Out (2014) – a Tortall short story which is part of the Protector of the Small quartet (2014 in Protector of the Small omnibus)

==== Not collected in Tortall and Other Lands ====
- Slippery in the Stairwell, 1965 (2009) – A contemporary, real-life short story in an anthology of first period stories. (2009 in My Little Red Book)
- Bone's Day Out (2014) – a Tortall short story which is part of the Protector of the Small quartet (2014 in Protector of the Small omnibus)

==== Collections ====
Tortall and Other Lands: A Collection of Tales (2010)

Contents:

- Student of Ostriches
- Elder Brother
- The Hidden Girl
- Nawat
- The Dragon's Tale
- Lost
- Time of Proving
- Plain Magic
- Mimic
- Huntress
- Comments on the Short Story "Testing"
- Testing
- ± Mastiff (promotional extract)
- ± Acknowledgements (Tortall and Other Lands)

==== Anthologies ====
- Young Warriors, Stories of Strength (2006) was compiled and edited by Tamora Pierce and Josepha Sherman

Contents:

- Introduction by Tamora Pierce
- The Gift of Rain Mountain by Bruce Holland Rogers
- The Magestone by S. M. and Jan Stirling
- Eli and the Dybbuk by Janis Ian
- Heartless by Holly Black
- Lioness by Pamela F. Service
- Thunderbolt by Esther Friesner
- Devil Wind by India Edghilll
- The Boy Who Cried "Dragon!" by Mike Resnick
- Student of Ostriches by Tamora Pierce
- Serpent's Rock by Laura Anne Gilman
- Hidden Warriors by Margaret Mahy
- Emerging Legacy by Doran Durgin
- An Axe for Men by Rosemary Edghilll
- Acts of Faith by Lesley McBain
- Swords that Talk by Brent Hartinger
- Afterword by Josepha Sherman

=== Comics ===
- White Tiger: A Hero's Compulsion (2006, six issues) by Tamora Pierce and Timothy Liebe, Illustrated by Philip Briones, Alvaro Rio and Ronald Adriano Silva

At the 2006 New York Comicon, Marvel Comics announced that Pierce and her husband Tim Liebe would write a new series, starring former FBI agent Angela Del Toro as the new White Tiger. White Tiger launched as a six-issue series drawn by French artist Phil Briones in November 2006.

- Double-Edged by Tamora Pierce, art by Cassandra James (2014) in Legend of Red Sonja: Issue Two, edited by Gail Simone

=== Essays ===
- The Best White Bread in 12 Systems or What To Do Till the Next Scene Develops (1996), in Serve It Forth – Cooking With Anne McCaffrey, editors Anne McCaffrey and John Gregory Betancourt (1996)
- Comments on the Short Story "Testing" (2000), in Tortall and Other Lands: A Collection of Tales (2000)
- Introduction (Young Warriors: Stories of Strength) (2005), in Young Warriors: Stories of Strength (2005)
- Introduction (The One Right Thing) (2008). in The One Right Thing by Bruce Coville (2008), edited by Deb Geisler, illustrated by Katherine Coville
- Introduction (The Art of Amy Brown II) (2010), in The Art of Amy Brown II by Amy Brown (2005)
- Acknowledgements (Tortall and Other Lands (2011), in Tortall and Other Lands: A Collection of Tales (2011)
- Foreword (Under the Moons of Mars) (2012), in Under the Moons of Mars: New Adventures on Barsoom (2012), editor John Joseph Adams
- Glossary (Battle Magic) (2013), in Battle Magic (2013)
- The Calendar of Months for the Circle Universe (2013), in Battle Magic (2013)
- Afterword (Alanna: The First Adventure) (2014)
- Afterword (In the Hand of the Goddess) (2014)
- Afterword (Lioness Rampant) (2014)
- Afterword (The Woman Who Rides Like a Man) (2014)
- Introduction (Dragonsong) (2015), in Dragonsong (2015) by Anne McCaffrey

=== Interviews ===
- Tamora Pierce: Girls Who Kick Butt (2002), in Locus, # 496 May 2002 by editor Charles N. Brown
- Tamora Pierce (2006), in The Wand in the Word: Conversations with Writers of Fantasy by Leonard S. Marcus
- Tamora Pierce: Lit By Fire (2012) in Locus, #618 July 2012 by editor Liza Groen Trombi

=== Others' compilations she has contributed to ===
- Planetfall (1986, anthology edited by Douglas Hill), with Plain Magic
- Serve It Forth – Cooking With Anne McCaffrey (1996, editors Anne McCaffrey and John Gregory Betancourt), with The Best White Bread in 12 Systems or What To Do Till the Next Scene Develops
- Flights of Fantasy (1999, editors Mercedes Lackey and Martin Harry Greenberg), with Plain Magic
- Lost and Found: Award-Winning Authors Sharing Real-Life Experiences Through Fiction (2000, an anthology edited by M. Jerry Weiss and Helen S. Weiss), with Testing
- Half Human, (2001, an anthology edited by Bruce Coville), with Elder Brother
- Locus, # 496 May 2002 (2002, by editor Charles N. Brown), with Tamora Pierce: Girls Who Kick Butt
- Firebirds Rising: An Anthology of Original Science Fiction and Fantasy (2006 an anthology edited by Sharyn November), with Huntress
- Dreams and Visions: Fourteen Flights of Fantasy (2006, an anthology edited by M. Jerry Weiss), with Hidden Girl
- Cricket (2006), with Time of Proving
- The Wand in the Word: Conversations with Writers of Fantasy (2006, by Leonard S. Marcus), with Tamora Pierce
- The One Right Thing (2008, by Bruce Coville, edited by Deb Geisler, illustrated by Katherine Coville), with Introduction (The One Right Thing)
- The Dragon Book: Magic Tales from the Master of Modern Fantasy (2009, an anthology edited by Jack Dann), with The Dragon's Tale
- My Little Red Book (2009, edited by Rachel Lauder Nalebuff), with Slippery in the Stairwell, 1965
- The Art of Amy Brown II (2005, by Amy Brown), with Introduction (The Art of Amy Brown II) (2010)
- The Realm of Imagination: Favorite Stories from Cricket Magazine (2011), with Time of Proving
- Under the Moons of Mars: New Adventures on Barsoom (2012, editor John Joseph Adams), with Foreword (Under the Moons of Mars)
- Locus, #618 July 2012 (2012 by editor Liza Groen Trombi), with Tamora Pierce: Lit By Fire
- Legend of Red Sonja: Issue Two (2014, edited by Gail Simone), with Double-Edged by Tamora Pierce, art by Cassandra James
- Dragonsong (2015, by Anne McCaffrey), with Introduction (Dragonsong)

=== Early works ===
Tamora Pierce was the "head writer for a company that did original radio comedy and drama in the 1980s, a part-time editor for two magazines, and the writer of various fiction and nonfiction for magazines". The first short story Tamora sold was to a women's romance magazine, titled "What We Did Was Sin".

=== Complete bibliography in publication order ===
- Alanna: The First Adventure (1983)
- In the Hand of the Goddess (1984)
- The Woman Who Rides Like a Man (1986)
- Planetfall (1986, anthology edited by Douglas Hill) – contributor (Plain Magic)
- Lioness Rampant (1988)
- Wild Magic (1992)
- Wolf-Speaker (1994)
- Emperor Mage (1995)
- The Realms of the Gods (1996)
- Serve It Forth – Cooking With Anne McCaffrey (1996, editors Anne McCaffrey and John Gregory Betancourt) – contributor (The Best White Bread in 12 Systems or What To Do Till the Next Scene Develops)
- Sandry's Book (1997)
- Tris's Book (1998)
- Daja's Book (1998)
- Briar's Book (1999)
- First Test (1999)
- Page (2000)
- Magic Steps (2000)
- Lost and Found: Award-Winning Authors Sharing Real-Life Experiences Through Fiction (2000, an anthology edited by M. Jerry Weiss and Helen S. Weiss) – contributor (Testing)
- Water and Fire (2001) – compilation
- Half Human, (2001, an anthology edited by Bruce Coville) – contributor (Elder Brother)
- Street Magic (2001)
- Squire (2001)
- Song of the Lioness (2002) – omnibus
- Locus, # 496 May 2002 (2002, by editor Charles N. Brown) – interviewed (Tamora Pierce: Girls Who Kick Butt)
- Cold Fire (2002)
- The Immortals (2002) – omnibus
- Lady Knight (2002)
- Air & Earth (2003) – compilation
- Shatterglass (2003)
- Trickster's Choice (2003)
- Trickster's Queen (2004)
- Protector of the Small (2004) – omnibus
- Tricksters (2005) – omnibus
- The Will of the Empress (2005)
- Firebirds Rising: An Anthology of Original Science Fiction and Fantasy (2006 an anthology edited by Sharyn November) – contributor (Huntress)
- Dreams and Visions: Fourteen Flights of Fantasy (2006, an anthology edited by M. Jerry Weiss) – contributor (Hidden Girl)
- Cricket (2006) – contributor (Time of Proving)
- The Wand in the Word: Conversations with Writers of Fantasy (2006, by Leonard S. Marcus) – interviewed
- Young Warriors, Stories of Strength (2006), compiled and edited by Tamora Pierce and Josepha Sherman – Anthology editor, contributor (Student of Ostriches)
- Terrier (2006)
- White Tiger: A Hero's Compulsion (2006, six issues) by Tamora Pierce and Timothy Liebe, Illustrated by Philip Briones, Alvaro Rio and Ronald Adriano Silva
- The One Right Thing (2008, by Bruce Coville, edited by Deb Geisler, illustrated by Katherine Coville) – introduction
- Melting Stones (2008)
- The Dragon Book: Magic Tales from the Master of Modern Fantasy (2009, an anthology edited by Jack Dann) – contributor (The Dragon's Tale)
- My Little Red Book (2009, edited by Rachel Lauder Nalebuff) – contributor (Slippery in the Stairwell)
- Bloodhound (2009)
- The Art of Amy Brown II (2005, by Amy Brown) – introduction (2010)
- Tortall and Other Lands: A Collection of Tales (2010)
- Mastiff (2011)
- Beka Cooper: The Hunt Records (2012) – omnibus
- Under the Moons of Mars: New Adventures on Barsoom (2012, editor John Joseph Adams) – contributor (foreword)
- Locus, #618 July 2012 (2012 by editor Liza Groen Trombi) – interviewed (Tamora Pierce: Lit By Fire)
- Battle Magic (2013)
- Legend of Red Sonja: Issue Two (2014, edited by Gail Simone), with Double-Edged by Tamora Pierce, art by Cassandra James
- Bone's Day Out (2014) – a Tortall short story which is part of the Protector of the Small quartet (2014 in Protector of the Small omnibus)
- Dragonsong (2015, by Anne McCaffrey) – introduction
- A Spy's Guide to Tortall: From the Desk of George Cooper (2017)
- Tempests and Slaughter (2018)

== Selected works about Tamora Pierce ==
- The Queen's Readers: A Collection of Essays on the Words and Worlds of Tamora Pierce (2014). Edited by Amanda Diehl and Holly Vaughn
