= The Circle Opens =

Four novels by Tamora Pierce, 2000–2003

The Circle Opens is a quartet of novels written by Tamora Pierce and set in a pseudo-medieval/renaissance era. It mainly revolves around four teenage mages, each specializing in a different kind of magic, as they find that they are forced to deal with mages whose powers are similarly unusual to their own. The series consists of the books Magic Steps (2000), Street Magic (2001), Cold Fire (2002), and Shatterglass (2003). The Circle Opens Quartet is the sequel quartet to The Circle Of Magic Quartet, and is followed by "Battle Magic" and The Will of the Empress.

== Plot and characters ==
The students are now 14 years old and fully qualified mages. Briar, Tris and Daja have gone travelling with their teachers, and Sandry has moved in with her great-uncle, Duke Vedris, in the Duke's Citadel. They believe they're still too young to teach but the decision is not up to them. Each of the four finds someone, or some ones, with magic, and according to the rules they must become the teacher until a more suitable one can be found. Each of the four also encounters a series of crimes they feel obligated to stop, and they must balance their teaching responsibilities with aiding the law.

=== Magic Steps ===
In Emelan, Sandry finds a rare dance mage who is unwilling to accept his power due to his family heritage and must convince him to train his magic, at the same time helping her great-uncle to solve the puzzling mystery of a series of clan murders.

- Sandrilene fa Toren, – also known as Sandry. A teenager of royal descent with thread magic and the power to weave magic itself.
- Dedicate Lark – Lark, who has thread magic, is Sandry's teacher at Winding Circle. She also helps the other students, but she prefers to teach Sandry.
- Pasco Acalon – A young boy who possesses dancing magic; Sandry's student.

=== Street Magic ===
In Chammur, Briar finds a street girl with stone magic. But in a land of gangs, no mage is safe. Evvy is tracked down by a dangerous gang called the Vipers, who are dominated by a takameri, Lady Zenadia, and Briar must balance his new respectable life with his old street life while stopping the gangs and Lady Zenadia.

- Briar Moss – Formerly a street rat by the name of Roach. His power is with plants.
- Dedicate Rosethorn – Rosethorn is Briar's teacher at Winding Circle, with power over plants as well.
- Evumeimei Dingzai – also known as Evvy, another former street rat with stone magic; Briar's student. Evvy's story is told in Melting Stones released in October 2008.

=== Cold Fire ===
In Namorn, Daja finds twin mages, each specialising in a different housework power. Daja does not have to teach them their powers, just how to sit straight long enough to concentrate on meditation. But when you put a hyperactive girl and a shy one together, nothing works. On top of all this, Daja must stop an insane arsonist from wiping out the city, whom she discovers she has helped to do so.

- Daja Kisubo – also known as Daj', A former sea trader whose ambient magic is with smithing. Can also control fire and heat.
- Dedicate Frostpine – A fiery blacksmith mage who teaches Daja.
- Niamara and Jorality Bacanor – also known as Nia and Jory. Twins in the freezing north, Namorn, who are ambient mages. Nia has woodworking magic, while Jory has magic with cooking.

=== Shatterglass ===
In Tharios, Tris meets a glass mage with a dangerous power: lightning. A twenty-year-old man just as stubborn as Tris, Kethlun won't accept Tris or any of her teachings. But when Kethlun's closest friends and a whole occupation is suddenly attacked, Keth and Tris must work together in a land where no tracking is possible due to religious beliefs.

- Trisana Chandler – also known as Tris. A teenager from a merchant family who has powerful control over the weather.
- Niklaren Goldeye – Also known as Niko. A powerful seer mage, he is Tris's teacher.
- Kethlun Warder – also known as Keth. A young man with ambient glass and lightning powers; Tris's student.
- Glaki – Tris's student with academic magic.
- Little Bear – A dog belonging to the four students. He is rescued by the children after Sandry finds him being beaten by some boys in an alley at the market in Summersea, and the four rush in to his rescue as part of the events in Sandry's Book. He and Tris form Glaki's foster-family after Glaki's mother and aunt are murdered.

== Publication and reception ==
The Circle Opens books began being published the year after the Circle of Magic quartet concluded in 1999, with the four books appearing one a year in 2000, 2001, 2002, and 2003.

The series' publisher, Scholastic Books, published a lesson plan for teachers to use the quartet in the classroom. The lesson plan suggests exploring the series' "refreshingly multiracial world," its representation of the student experience, and literary techniques of sensory writing, simile, and plot suspense.
