= Terrier (novel) =

2006 novel by Tamora Pierce

- Author: Tamora Pierce
- Language: English
- Series: Beka Cooper
- Genre: Fantasy novel
- Publisher: Random House Books for Young Readers
- Publication date: October 2006
- Publication place: United States
- Media type: Print (Hardback & Paperback)
- Pages: 592pp
- ISBN: 0-375-81468-X
- OCLC: 70106277
- LC Class: PZ7.P61464 Ter 2006
- Followed by: Bloodhound

Terrier is a young adult fantasy novel by Tamora Pierce, the first book in the Provost's Dog trilogy and the fifteenth book set in the Tortall Universe. It tells the story of Rebakah "Beka" Cooper, the ancestor of George Cooper from Song of the Lioness and Alianne from Trickster's Choice and Trickster's Queen. It is set 200 years prior to the bulk of the Tortall novels.

== Plot summary ==
The story is told in the form of a series of journal entries made by Beka Cooper as she trains to become a Provosts Dog, a nickname for the police men and women in the employ of the Lord Provost of Tortall, with a prelude taken from Eleni Cooper's diary in which she relates Beka's story to her son George. Beka is also the surrogate daughter of the Provost, having helped him capture a band of dangerous criminals when she was only 8 years old. Lord Gershom adopts her, her mother, and her brothers and sisters from the "scummer" life of Mutt Piddle Lane, where the very poor live.

Beka begins her training assigned as a Puppy, or a Dog in his or her first year of training, to two revered senior Dogs in the Lower City: Clary Goodwin and Mattes Tunstall. Though the Dogs are initially unsure of their new charge, Beka proves to be a valuable resource, although she is extremely shy and has a hard time speaking in front of people.

Through Beka's unusual magical abilities, she is able to hear the voices of ghosts who ride the backs of pigeons until they are ready to enter the Peaceful Realms of the Black God (the god of death). She can also hear snippets of conversations that may contain valuable information caught by "dust spinners," beings made of breeze and dirt mixed from the city streets. From these sources she learns of two grave threats to the Lower City. One is the Shadow Snake.

Old bedtime tales featured the Shadow Snake as something to instill good behaviors into small children. However, a ruthless killer who abducts these children has taken on the name, and uses the threat of harming the children to force their parents to give up their most prized valuable possessions, killing the kidnapped children if the price is not paid.

The other threat is an unknown party who keeps hiring digging crews to search for fire opals (rare and extremely expensive stones that not only have irresistible beauty, but supply mages with a certain power). Then they swear the workers to secrecy, and kill them when the job is done.

Beka's determination to see both parties brought to justice will place her in the middle of a power struggle in Tortall's underworld.

Beka's cat, Pounce, helps Beka throughout the book. Pounce has purple eyes and it has been observed that he may be god-marked. Tamora Pierce has noted in her blog that Pounce is the same character known as Faithful, Alanna's cat in the Song of the Lioness quartet. It is worth noting that the first name that is suggested for Faithful was "Pounce".

In the second novel in this series it is revealed that Pounce is actually a constellation, not a god. However, he has the ability to speak, hear Beka's thoughts at close range when she wishes, and perform tasks most cats cannot.

Crookshank is a landlord who owns most property in the Lower City and is hated by everyone for his unfairly high rates and his cruel retaliation when rent cannot be paid. His grandson, Rolond, is killed by the alleged Shadow Snake. Beka is best friends with Tansy, Crookshank's granddaughter-in-law, which helps Beka gain extra information about what is going on in the household.

Through her training as a Dog, her time spent with pigeons and Dust Spinners, and with the help of her friends Koramin Ingensra, Rosto the Piper, and Aniki Forfrysning (a mage, rusher, and a sword fighter who work for the Rogue, the king of crime in the city) Beka gains information about the opals and the Shadow Snake.

She soon discovers that it is Crookshank who has been hiring the diggers to be murdered, and the Shadow Snake is demanding a large number of fire opals.

After Crookshank's son has also been taken by the Snake, and he still refuses to pay up, Beka and her Dogs discover the culprit- or at least who they think is the culprit: the son of Mistress Noll, a local baker, named Yates, who commits suicide instead of allowing himself to be captured. When Beka goes to tell Mistress Noll the news, she discovers it was not her son, but the mother who was the Snake.

Noll sends a curse flying at Beka, but Pounce gets in the way and eats the curse, giving Beka time to arrest Mistress Noll, who is later brought to justice for her crimes.

Crookshank later dies in a riot, and Rosto, Beka's rusher friend, becomes Rogue, making Kora and Aniki District Chiefs (acting Rogues for each district.)

== Main character(s) ==
- Rebakah (Beka) Cooper: Beka is a 16-year-old girl with a very strong sense of justice; her love for the people of the Lower City she grew up in leads her to request a placement there, a district most Dogs would rather avoid. Beka has the ability to hear the voices of the restless spirits that ride the backs of pigeons, and to hear the voices that drift into the city's dust spinners. Because of her special abilities and her relationship and training with the Lord Provost, Beka begins the story with a rather arrogant attitude, assuming she will be promoted to full Dog faster than any Puppy in history. Beka also is very shy around strangers and has trouble with speaking to them especially in front of an audience. She sees this as her greatest flaw. She writes in her journal that she has feelings for Rosto, feelings she won't let him know. To quote, "He makes me tingle."
- Rosto the Piper: Rosto is a young man of Scanran ancestry and questionable loyalties. He has very pale skin, white blond hair and black eyes. He also has a large number of scars and blade wounds on his arms and face. He is vain and extremely sensitive about his age, getting angry when Beka calls him old and says he has white hair to distract him from flirting with her. He scorns the current Rogue of Corus as having lost his grip, and later usurps the 'throne' (gaining him yet another scar) and becomes King of the Rogue. Rosto has two female friends who came with him from Scanra: Aniki, a swordswoman, and Kora, a mage. Beka first meets the three in a bar, when Rosto stops the barman from harassing Beka. Later, they meet in the Court of the Rogue, where, presumably, the threesome were scouting out the competition. Rosto, Aniki, and Kora become very good friends with Beka throughout and into the story, even moving into her boarding house and sharing breakfast with her. Rosto often flirts with Beka, who doesn't really appreciate it. This flirtation comes to a head when Rosto defeats the Rogue and when telling his friends of his victory, kisses Beka in celebration.
- Tunstall and Goodwin: The Dog partners Beka is assigned to, said to be the best pair in the whole city. They go to the Court of the Rogue to collect the Happy Bag (slang for a sizeable bribe, which the underpaid Dogs live on). Matthias Tunstall, called Mattes by friends, is a tall man (6’3”) who comes from the Eastern Hills. Goodwin sometimes refers to him as a “Hill barbarian.” He is almost always friendly-sounding, even when issuing dire threats.
- Clara Goodwin: called Clary by friends, is a brunette woman renowned for her tough personality, and holds the city record for the most successfully delivered "nap taps" (a baton strike to the jaw that causes unconsciousness if done right, and a broken jaw if not). The pair are known to nearly everyone in the slums, and, at first, are somewhat put out at getting a Puppy, feeling that any Puppy would be a liability in their hazardous job. When they realize the extent of Beka's talents, magical and otherwise, they soften up and accept her.
- Kebibi Ahuda: Evening Watch's Watch Sergeant. She is a spunky, incorruptible Black woman who trains new Puppies and Dogs up to four years how to fight and protect themselves. Teaches everything from raid formations to basic baton use. Develops a strong liking for Beka, and even defends her to the other Trainees (Puppies) when they start calling her “Fishpuppy”.
- Lord Gershom of Haryse: Beka's adoptive father, who took in her whole family (six people) when she was just eight years old after she brought him the Bold Brass Gang. A kind, understanding, patient man who loves Beka as his own daughter, and makes sure she gets the best in the Provost's Guard.
- Lady Sabine of Macayhill (MACK-ee-hill): A lady knight who meets Beka in a riot in a tavern on Rovers Street called the Barrel's Bottom. A saucy, strong-willed woman who takes no nonsense when it comes from someone she doesn't respect. Snarky and has attitude with those of noble blood, but is kind and generous to those beneath her in station. Ends up being Tunstall's lover.
- Sir Tullus of Kings Reach: Male Knight, Magistrate of the Lower City. Rules his court with an iron fist, but develops a liking for the shy, stammering Beka Cooper. Has a no nonsense attitude with the Rats (criminals) who enter his court whining about family or debt, or the Dog who caught them. He even defends Beka more than once, and encourages her, in his own way, to do her best with comments like, “While we live, Cooper.” Quote from Bloodhound: “If there is a betting pool, I will place a gold noble on Cooper,” Lord Gershom replied. I heard a snort. I couldn't be sure who did it, of course, but I suspect Sir Tullus. I have been amusing that cove for a year and a half, somehow.’ End quote. Sir Tullus has red hair, and a unibrow, plus a fair number of scars.
