= Street Magic =

2001 book by Tamora Pierce

- Cover featuring Briar and Evvy in Chammur's Grand Bazaar .
- Author: Tamora Pierce
- Language: English
- Series: The Circle Opens
- Genre: Fantasy novel
- Publisher: Scholastic Press
- Publication date: April 2001
- Publication place: United States
- Media type: Print (Hardback & Paperback)
- Pages: 300 pp
- ISBN: 0-590-39628-5 (hardback edition) & ISBN 0-590-39643-9 (paperback edition)
- OCLC: 44927014
- LC Class: PZ7.P61464 St 2001
- Preceded by: Magic Steps
- Followed by: Cold Fire

Street Magic is the second book in the quartet The Circle Opens by fantasy author Tamora Pierce. It describes the further adventures of child-mage Briar Moss in his travels with his teacher, Dedicate Rosethorn.

== Plot summary ==
The plant mage Briar Moss, now fourteen years old, and his teacher Dedicate Rosethorn are sojourning in the city of Chammur on their way to the empire of Yanjing. One day in the Golden House souk, Briar sees a flicker of magic at a stall where a ten-year-old girl named Evumeimei, or Evvy, is polishing stones. Briar suspects that the girl, like him, has ambient magic powers, with hers being related to minerals rather than plants.

Chammur is home to a number of street gangs, whose conflict Briar is drawn into. One of these, called the Vipers, have a patron, a wealthy widow named Lady Zenadia. The noblewoman took on the gang as a project out of boredom; she provides them with money and gifts and urges them to fight their rivals for supremacy. However, unbeknownst to them, she has their members killed if they displease her. Zenadia also becomes aware of Evvy and instructs the Vipers to bring the girl into their fold.

Rosethorn informs Briar that as the first one to notice Evvy’s magic, he is responsible for finding her a teacher or, if he cannot, teaching her himself. Briar tries repeatedly to speak to the girl, but she refuses to listen, until one day, frightened by a group of Vipers trying to capture her, she throws a handful of white-hot gravel at the gang. Briar plans to bring her to Jebilu Stoneslicer, the only other stone mage in the city.

Briar goes to the palace and visits Stoneslicer, a haughty and unpleasant man who refuses to teach Evvy. Briar, outraged, informs Rosethorn, who as a member of the international mages’ council has the authority to sanction Stoneslicer.

Briar rents a stall at Golden House, where he plans to sell his shakkans or miniature trees. Zenadia visits and pretends interest in Briar’s wares. The lady offers to bring Evvy into her household as a companion and errand-runner; Briar, discomfited but unsure why, demurs. Stoneslicer, having been persuaded by Rosethorn, also comes to the souk. He tests Evvy’s magic and finds she is extremely powerful. He demands she come to the palace immediately, but she refuses, put off by his imperious manner. Briar, seeing that the snobbish mage would be a terrible teacher for Evvy, realizes he must continue teaching her himself, and forms a magical connection with her in the process.

On his way home from delivering a shakkan to Lady Zenadia's mansion, Briar is stopped by the City Watch, who take him to see the mutabir, or magistrate. The mutabir asks Briar what he knows about the widow and informs him that many rumours regarding deaths and disappearances circulate around the noblewoman; four Watch spies placed in her household disappeared and were never seen again.

While Rosethorn is away for a few days, a Viper girl lures Briar away from the house. In his absence, an intruder breaks into the house and kidnaps Evvy. Briar follows his connection to his pupil, which leads him first to the Vipers’ hideout and then to Lady Zenadia’s mansion, leaving magically induced botanical destruction in his wake.

While walking through the gardens at the mansion, Briar smells rotting meat. The magically encouraged plants have disrupted the soil, churning up the corpses of the many people that Zenadia has had assassinated. Evvy joins Briar, having used her magic to destroy the stone walls of the chamber that held her. The Watch arrives as Lady Zenadia’s servants try to flee. Briar and Evvy find the noblewoman in her personal chambers, and Briar informs her that the Watch have been looking for their dead spies. Realizing there is no escape for her, Zenadia kills herself.

When Rosethorn returns, she finds Briar and Evvy in a caravansery outside the city, since the amir has politely but firmly requested that they leave Chammur. The authorities are unable to clean up the plant growth at the Viper hideout and the mansion. Rosethorn has also written to the council informing them of Stoneslicer’s treatment of his fellow mages, and representatives are en route to discuss the matter with him. Two days later, Briar, Evvy and Rosethorn depart with a caravan to Yanjing, hopeful for the future.

== See also ==
- Battle Magic
- Melting Stones
- The Will of the Empress
