= Battle Magic (novel) =

2013 novel by Tamora Pierce

- Author: Tamora Pierce
- Original title: Battle Magic
- Cover artist: Christopher Stengel
- Language: English
- Genre: Fantasy
- Publisher: Scholastic
- Publication date: September 24, 2013
- Publication place: USA
- Media type: Print
- Pages: 464
- ISBN: 978-0439842976
- Preceded by: Street Magic
- Followed by: Melting Stones, The Will of the Empress

Battle Magic, a fantasy novel by young adult author Tamora Pierce, was released by Scholastic on September 24, 2013.

The book follows Pierce's characters Briar Moss, Evumeimei Dingzai (nicknamed Evvy), and Rosethorn after the events of her 2001 novel Street Magic. The action is set in the fictional countries of Gyongxe and Yanjing as they become embroiled in war. All events take place two years before Pierce's previously published Emelan universe novels The Will of the Empress and Melting Stones.

== Plot ==
Gyongxe is a tiny mountain kingdom which is home to temples of many faiths, including the First Temple of the Living Circle. Briar, Evvy, and Rosethorn spend a winter as a guest of its ruler, the twelve-year-old God-King.

The three mages depart in the spring to visit the palace and gardens of the emperor of Yanjing, where they learn Emperor Weishu is a brutal despot who demands perfect submission from all around him. At the emperor’s court, they befriend Parahan, a prince of the Realms of the Sun kept as Weishu’s hostage and slave. The night before the three mages are due to leave Yanjing, Evvy and Briar free Parahan, who informs them that Weishu has conquered two neighbouring countries and is turning his attentions to Gyongxe. The mages and Parahan decide to go back to Gyongxe to warn its residents and are caught up in the ensuing violence, at times having to fight their way through the mountains.

The three mages split up after crossing the border. Rosethorn is sent on a mission to hide the Four Treasures of the First Temple, while Briar and Parahan join the fight against Weishu’s army. Both Rosethorn and Briar, as a consequence of touching the treasures, are able to see the gods of Gyongxe inhabiting the paintings that decorate local temples, and on her mission, Rosethorn encounters many of the “spirit people” - various kinds of supernatural creatures that inhabit the country’s wilderness.

Evvy remains behind at a fort which is meant to be safe, but it is soon overrun by Yanjingi soldiers. The young girl is caught and tortured, but rather than give up the locations of her friends, she uses her magic to feign death and escapes as the sole survivor of the ensuing massacre. Following a mysterious singing she hears in her bones, she comes to a cave where she is greeted by a creature made of fluorite. The creature tells her that he is the heart of a mountain and that she may call him Luvo; having sensed her magic from afar and become curious, he sang to call her to him. Evvy stays with Luvo for a time, with her injuries being tended by the spirit people.

Rosethorn, Evvy and Luvo are reunited with Briar as they join the Gyongxin army and its allies on the march to the capital city of Garmashing, fighting against the Yanjingi forces en route. With the mages' help, the Gyongxin people defend the city, winning a major battle. Weishu waits until his former guests are within the capital before having his mages cast a sleeping spell over the city, and a traitor within opens the gates. When the citizens awaken after three days, the Yanjingi have taken Garmashing. However, while the emperor gloats over his victory, the spirit people and the gods of Gyongxe rise up and defeat the invaders. The foreign armies break and flee, and Weishu is forced to sue for peace.

Briar, Evvy, and Rosethorn plan to return to Emelan. Luvo, to Evvy’s surprise, decides he will travel with her to continue her education and to learn from her in turn.
