= Bloodhound (novel) =

2009 novel by Tamora Pierce

- Author: Tamora Pierce
- Cover artist: Jonathan Barkat
- Language: English
- Series: Provost's Dog
- Genre: Fantasy novel
- Publisher: Random House
- Publication date: April 14, 2009
- Publication place: United States
- Media type: Print (hardcover)
- Pages: 560
- ISBN: 0-375-81469-8
- Preceded by: Terrier
- Followed by: Mastiff

Bloodhound, by Tamora Pierce, is the second novel in a fictional trilogy, Provost's Dog, about a young Provost guard-woman in a fantasy kingdom called Tortall. The first book was called Terrier, and the third is called Mastiff.

Bloodhound continues the story of how Beka Cooper manages to survive as a Provost Guard, or a Dog, in the Lower City slums of Tortall. In this book, she travels to Port Caynn to investigate a silver coin counterfeiting ring and faces many obstacles as she tries to root out and stop the crime.

== Background ==
Bloodhound came out on April 14, 2009, in the United States as a hardback copy. Like the first novel, the narration of Bloodhound is written in a first-person point of view, from the perspective of the main character, Rebakah (Beka) Cooper.

Beka Cooper's series connects to the other Tortall books in that she is the six-times great-grandmother of George Cooper from Alanna: The First Adventure. Rosto the Piper, the Corus Rogue and Beka's close friend, builds the Dancing Dove as his Court. During his days as Rogue, George uses the inn as his Court, as well.

== Plot summary ==
Beka's story continues when she gets sloppy with her reports to Ahuda, and she decides to practice again by starting a new journal.

Now a first year Dog, Beka works the Evening Watch with her loathsome partner, Silsbee. His attitude of letting Day Watch catch the criminals they see annoys Beka to no end. Silsbee eventually dumps her as a partner, and she is partnered with Clara Goodwin and Matthias Tunstall, her former trainers.

Beka learns of the existence of coles, or counterfeit coins, from her friend Tansy. As she and her partners investigate, they get word of a thin harvest, which bodes ill for the poor of the Lower City. Beka and Pounce—a speaking constellation in the form of a cat—find Achoo, a bloodhound, being hurt by her handler. When Beka steps in to stop the abuse, she takes Achoo as her scent-hound. Meanwhile, due to the thin harvest, bread prices go up and a riot starts in the city. Beka, Goodwin and Tunstall get caught up in the fight, and Tunstall gets both of his legs broken.

After the riot, Lord Gershom, the Lord Provost, sends Beka, Goodwin and Achoo to Port Caynn to further investigate the coles while Tunstall recovers. Pounce, for once, cannot go with her as he is actually a constellation and he must deal with some troublesome stars. They depart and on board the ship are reacquainted with Dale Rowan, a banker who helped them during the Bread Riot.

Together Goodwin and Beka make friends and try to pry information, pretending to be corrupt, or "loose." Beka's romance with Dale blossoms, and Goodwin too flirts playfully, though she never forgets her husband Tomlan back home. When Goodwin returns to Corus to deliver reports to Lord Gershom, Beka comes across several pieces of evidence that point to Pearl Skinner, the Port Caynn Rogue, as the colemonger. She goes to Sir Lionel of Trebond, the Deputy Provost, but Sir Lionel's fear of Pearl (who had previously threatened his family) prevents him from acting. Beka loses her temper with him, and Sir Lionel orders her sent to Rattery Prison. With the help of one of the loyal Dogs, Beka is able to escape and goes to Pearl for shelter.

Through use of a gift, flattery and an amusing tale degrading Sir Lionel, Beka is able to convince Pearl to let her stay for now. However, one of Lionel's men goes to Pearl and tells her that Beka has evidence that Pearl is the one behind the coles, and Beka is forced to flee once more.

This time, Beka goes to Nestor Haryse, Lord Gershom's younger cousin, and his transgender lover, Okha Soyan (Amber Orchid). With Nestor's help, Gershom is able to bring in a large squad of Dogs to arrest Pearl and her conspirators. Pearl and her bodyguards escape, but Beka follows them down into the city's sewers, where, with Achoo and Goodwin's help, she manages to arrest Pearl. They suffer numerous wounds, and when Beka wakes, she must face the sad reality that she and Dale must part; they live too far apart, and their jobs leave no time for each other.

When they return to Corus, Goodwin tells Beka that the Evening Watch Sergeant, Ahuda, was offered a position in Corus's Flash District, and that Goodwin was going to take Ahuda's place, leaving Beka with Tunstall as a partner. She says that she is tired of being a street dog, and that desk sergeant will be the perfect position for her. The novel ends at Beka and Goodwin's welcome home party, as Beka and Tunstall agree to stay partners. She gains a new nickname, Bloodhound, from the public and her friends.

== Characters ==
Rebakah (Beka) Cooper
The main protagonist of the story, Beka narrates the novel from first-person perspective. A determined, strong young woman with ice blue eyes and the ability to hear ghosts, she struggles with shyness but breaks out of her shell as the series continues.

Pounce
Pounce, Beka's cat who has unusual purple eyes, is actually the constellation known as the Cat, which is missing when this story takes place. He can communicate with Beka and certain other people, if he chooses to.

Achoo Curlypaws
Achoo is a scent hound for the Provost's Guard in the Lower City. After Achoo's last handler left the Provost's Guard, she was passed along between handlers until Beka saw her being mistreated and took responsibility for Achoo. She proves to be a loyal scent hound later in the book, when she helps Beka nab the colemonger.

Rosto the Piper
The Rogue of the Lower City, Rosto is a close friend to Beka. Although the first book portrayed romantic hints between Beka and Rosto, the second book keeps them apart as Beka pursues other romantic interests. Rosto, however, continues to make it clear that he wants Beka as his lover.

Clara Goodwin
Partner of Matthias Tunstall, and one of Beka's former trainers in Terrier. Clary is fierce, strong, and an experienced Dog. Her husband is Tomlan Goodwin.

Matthias Tunstall
Mattes is the partner of Clara Goodwin. He is 6 feet, 3 inches tall. Beka describes him as having an owlish look; during the span of the novel, his lover is Sabine of Macayhill, a lady knight.

Silsbee
Silsbee is Beka's fourth partner, who asks for reassignment.

Hempstead
Achoo’s last handler before Beka finds her being abused by him.

Dale Rowan
Dale is the Courier for the Goldsmith's Guild; he first met Beka during the Bread Riot. He met Beka again on the way to Port Caynn and became her love interest. He is described as light haired and thin and muscled like an acrobat. When the story ends, he reveals that he only wanted a casual relationship.

Pearl Skinner
Pearl is the Rogue in Port Caynn; her greedy nature makes her start the colemongering (counterfeiting coins). Is hot-tempered and is more likely to strike first and ask questions later.
