= Cold Fire (Pierce novel) =

2002 novel by Tamora Pierce

- Cover featuring Daja ice-skating in Kugisko.
- Author: Tamora Pierce
- Language: English
- Series: The Circle Opens
- Genre: Fantasy novel
- Publisher: Scholastic Press
- Publication date: April 2002
- Publication place: United States
- Media type: Print (hardback & paperback)
- Pages: 384 pp
- ISBN: 0-590-39655-2 (hardback edition) & ISBN 0-590-39656-0 (paperback edition)
- OCLC: 47208513
- LC Class: PZ7.P61464 Co 2002
- Preceded by: Street Magic
- Followed by: Shatterglass

Cold Fire is the third book in the series The Circle Opens by author Tamora Pierce. It deals with the continuing adventures of child mage Daja Kisubo and her teacher, the dedicate initiate Frostpine.

== Plot summary ==
Daja and her teacher Frostpine are wintering with the Bancanor family in the Namornese city of Kugisko. A friend of the family, Bennat, or Ben, Ladradun is a widower who has returned to the city to live with his mother after his wife and children were killed in a fire. Consequently, he spends much of his time away from his family’s fur-trading business, teaching the locals how to prevent fires and how to fight them when they occur. Daja meets him when he rescues a pair of children from a burning building; impressed by his courage, she befriends him and offers to make him a pair of magical fireproof gauntlets to help him in his quest.

The young smith mage also discovers that Nia and Jory, the Bancanors’ twelve-year-old twin daughters, have ambient magic - the quiet, introverted Nia in woodcraft and the more outgoing and energetic Jory in cooking. Daja teaches the girls meditation and searches out a teacher for each of them. Nia goes to a large workshop nearby, while Jory begins working in the kitchens of a charity hospital.

Secretly, Ben has begun to crave the power he feels when fighting fires and the adulation of being seen as a hero, especially in contrast to the treatment he receives from his miserly, hectoring mother. Telling himself that the local authorities are not taking the threat of fires seriously and must be taught, he begins committing arson. At first, he tries to minimize the harm to human life, but as time goes on, he becomes excited by having power over life and death. As casualties mount, Daja and Heluda Salt, a mage employed by the local magistrate, grow suspicious that the fires are being set deliberately, though they do not initially suspect the fur merchant.

Daja completes the gauntlets and presents them to Ben. Ben tells Daja he will be away from Kugisko for a time on business, in order to allay suspicion. However, he leaves two days later than announced in order to secretly plant an explosive in the furnace of a public bathhouse. After the resulting blast kills and injures dozens, Heluda salvages the furnace’s iron door from the wreckage. Daja is able to trace her own magic through the metal and determines that it was touched by Ben while he was wearing the gauntlets, and the two mages realize that he is the arsonist.

When Ben returns from his trip, Heluda has left him a note asking him to visit the office of the magistrate. He murders his mother, sets fire to their house, and flees. Daja is able to extinguish the fire before it spreads, but Nia, sensing that something is wrong with her twin, insists they go to the charity hospital. Although Jory managed to escape unhurt, the hospital is catastrophically aflame before Nia and Daja arrive.

After helping rescue as many people as she can, Daja pursues and captures Ben. The arsonist is tried and sentenced to death by burning on the site of the bathhouse; in a last gesture for their former friendship, Daja magically stokes the execution fire to a white heat so that he dies quickly.

Five months later, with the assistance of Daja, Frostpine and the Bancanor twins, the hospital has been rebuilt. With spring on the way, the two smith mages bid goodbye to their host family and resume their travels.
