= Sandry's Book =

1997 fantasy novel by Tamora Pierce

- Cover featuring Sandry and Briar.
- Author: Tamora Pierce
- Language: English
- Series: Circle of Magic
- Genre: Fantasy novel
- Publisher: Scholastic Press
- Publication date: 1997
- Publication place: United States
- Media type: Print (Hardcover & Paperback)
- Pages: 252 pp
- ISBN: 0-590-55356-9
- OCLC: 33358633
- LC Class: PZ7.P61464 San 1997
- Followed by: Tris's Book

Sandry's Book, by Tamora Pierce is a fantasy novel set mainly in the fictional nation of Emelan. It is the first in a quartet of books: The Circle of Magic, about four young mages as they discover their magic.

== Plot ==
Following an outbreak of plague which killed her parents, ten-year-old Lady Sandrilene fa Toren, or Sandry, is rescued by the mage Niklaren Goldeyes, known as Niko. Niko takes her first to the city of Summersea, the home of her great-uncle Duke Vedris, the ruler of Emelan. Vedris believes that life in the ducal palace would be too lonely for Sandry, and he suggests that she live instead at the nearby Winding Circle Temple of the Living Circle faith, where many children are educated by the dedicates.

Niko also finds three other similarly aged children and brings them to the temple: a Trader girl named Daja Kisubo, whose entire family was killed in a shipwreck, causing her to be declared an outcast by her people; Briar Moss, a homeless orphan in a street gang, who was about to be sentenced to hard labour for stealing; and Trisana "Tris" Chandler, a daughter of a large merchant house, who has been rejected by her family.

Once they arrive at Winding Circle, Daja and Briar are bullied by other children for their backgrounds, Tris refuses to interact with the dedicates and her dormitory-mates, and Sandry is unhappy living with the other wealthy and noble girls. As a result, all four of them are sent to live at Discipline, a cottage on the temple grounds, where they are looked after by the kind Dedicate Lark and the prickly Dedicate Rosethorn.

At Discipline, the children realize the inclinations that were unacceptable in their previous lives are in fact their strengths. Sandry and Daja were previously punished for their respective interests in textiles and metalwork, but Sandry learns weaving and spinning from Lark, and Daja smithing from another dedicate, Frostpine. Briar becomes close to Rosethorn due to their shared love of plants. Niko teaches Tris about weather and the natural world, and that the strange things that happen around her, such as unexpected lightning and hailstorms and her ability to hear voices on the wind, are not because she is possessed by a demon or insane; rather, these are abilities of hers that she can learn to control.

Niko also teaches all four children meditation. After an incident in the Summersea market, where the children get into a fight to protect a dog from bullies, Niko tells them that they all have a rare form of magic. Unlike most mages, their talents lie in their relationships with objects and forces in the world around them, which is why their abilities went undetected by the adults around them for so long. Niko wanted them to learn discipline of thought as well as about their respective areas of interest before they learned magecraft.

The children adopt the dog and name him Little Bear. Shortly after Midsummer, while on a walk with the children, Little Bear runs off and gets lost in a cave. They follow him, only to be trapped when an earthquake strikes and the cave collapses. Their magic prevents them from being crushed, but they realize that none of them alone has the ability to get them out. Each puts a small amount of their magic into a thread spun by Sandry, enabling her to spin their abilities together and combine them into a greater whole, which makes them collectively powerful enough to escape the cave-in. Once they have recovered from their ordeal, they realize they are now able to communicate without speaking and use each others’ talents as well.

== See also ==
- Magic Steps
- The Will of the Empress
