= Tortall and Other Lands =

Collection of short stories by Tamora Pierce published in 2012

Tortall and Other Lands: A Collection of Tales
- Author: Tamora Pierce
- Cover artist: Jan Gerardi
- Language: English
- Genre: Fantasy
- Publisher: Bluefire
- Publication date: April 10, 2012
- Publication place: United States
- Media type: Print
- Pages: 400
- ISBN: 978-0375866333

Tortall and Other Lands: A Collection of Tales (/tɔːrˈtɔːl/ tor-TAWL) is a collection of short stories by young adult fantasy author Tamora Pierce. The anthology includes stories set in Tortall, a fantasy kingdom appearing in many of Pierce's works, as well as stories set in the real world. In addition, besides gathering together Pierce's seven previously published short stories, Tortall and Other Lands includes three original stories written specifically for this collection.

== Contents ==
Many of the stories in the collection have been published previously in anthologies and magazines. The stories are listed below in the order in which they appear in the book.

Title	Previously published in	Year published
Student of Ostriches	Young Warriors: Stories of Strength, ed. Tamora Pierce and Josepha Sherman	2005
Elder Brother	Half Human, ed. Bruce Coville	2001
The Hidden Girl	Dreams and Visions, ed. Helen and M. Jerry Weiss	2006
Nawat		2012
The Dragon's Tale	The Dragon Book: Magical Tales from the Masters of Modern Fantasy	2009
Lost		2012
Time of Proving	Cricket	2006
Plain Magic	Planetfall, Flights of Fantasy	1986
Mimic		2012
Huntress	Firebirds Rising, ed. Sharyn November	2006
Testing	Lost and Found: Award-Winning Authors Sharing Real-Life Experiences Through Fiction, ed. Helen and M. Jerry Weiss	2000
