= Provost's Dog =

Novel trilogy by Tamora Pierce

- Terrier; Bloodhound; Mastiff
- Author: Tamora Pierce
- Country: United States
- Language: English
- Genre: Young adult, fantasy
- Publisher: Random House
- Published: 2006 – 2011
- Media type: Print (hardcover and paperback)

The Provost's Dog trilogy is a series of young adult fantasy novels by best-selling author Tamora Pierce. The series is a prequel to Pierce's first quartet, The Song of the Lioness, and is set in the fictional kingdom of Tortall two hundred years earlier. It details the adventures of Beka Cooper, a sixteen-year-old recruit of the Lord Provost, originally from a lower city family and now in service to the Provost's Guard.

== Series ==
- Terrier (October 2006)
- Bloodhound (April 2009)
- Mastiff, previous working title Elkhound (October 2011)

== Characters ==
=== Major characters ===
- Rebekah "Beka" Cooper – A young, up-and-coming member of the Provost's Guard and protégée to the Lord Provost. Ancestor of George Cooper. Beka has magic that allows her to hear restless spirits on the backs of pigeons and dust spinners (beings of air that catch sounds and conversations on breezes). She is sometimes referred to as Fishpuppy, a reference to her first night as a "Puppy", when she was tripped while chasing a cutpurse and landed in a pile of fish guts. She is also sometimes referred to as "Terrier", because she "sticks her teeth in and never lets go", a reference to how she never stops until she has brought criminals to justice, shown by her tedious pursuit of a drunk mot through the entire length of the Lower City. Later she is also referred to as "Bloodhound", due to her searching out and bringing down Pearl Skinner, the Rogue of Port Caynn and counterfeiter. She is also the object of Rosto's flirtations; although she discourages him and for a brief period of time even has another lover, Dale Rowan.
- Pounce – A black cat with purple eyes, Beka's foundling pet, who can choose if humans or other creatures can hear him. Pounce is a constellation (called the Cat), companion to the Mother Goddess, that has come to live on Earth alongside the Goddess's favored. This is actually the same cat known as Faithful from the Song of the Lioness Quartet.
- Matthias (Mattes) Tunstall and Clara (Clary) Goodwin – Veteran guards assigned to train Beka during her puppy year or years. They eventually become her partners, and when Goodwin retires to become Sergeant, Tunstall continues to work with Beka, calling her the best new dog he's ever worked with.
- Rosto the Piper – Potential romantic interest to Beka and occasional comic relief, Rosto also moves the plot along first as a Scanran Rusher and later, as "the Rogue" (king of the lower city). As the Rogue, he maintains order among the lower city "Rats," and doles out justice on matters in which the Provost's Dogs can't or won't become involved. Rosto moves into Beka's boarding house with Kora and Aniki, and they become slow friends. As the Shadowsnake case becomes more serious, their relationship grows. With the series's progression, his appearances and importance to the plot increase as well. Rosto is described as a 22-year-old who stands at five feet and ten inches. He is skinny but well muscled, extremely pale, with nearly white hair and black eyes. On his left eyebrow, he has a sideways, forked scar.
- Sabine of Macayhill – A lady knight, and Tunstall's love interest.
- Lord Gershom of Haryse - The Lord Provost and Beka's foster father, Lord Gershom took Beka in after she delivered the Bold Brass Gang to him at age eight. Throughout the series, he remains a paternal, though impartial figure, treating Beka with affection but without giving her any special favors. Beka greatly respects him and wants to make him proud.

=== Minor characters ===
- Acton of Fenrigh – Watch Commander of the Jane Street Kennel, where Beka is posted.
- Kebibi Ahuda – A constantly beleaguered Watch Sergeant that is said to have a soft spot for Beka.
- Ersken Westover and Verene – Trainee guards from Beka's year. Verene is later killed.
- Aniki Forfrysning – Scanran rusher and swordswoman, friend of Kora, Beka and Rosto.
- Koramin (Kora) Ingensra – A rogue and mage. Ersken's lover, as of Terrier, as well as Rosto's "left hand."
- Phelan – A second year Dog, friend of Ersken and Beka, Verene's lover. He later joins the Court of the Rogue after Verene's murder.
- Tansy Lofts – Crookshank's grandson's wife and Beka's childhood friend. Tansy's son, Rolond, was killed by a mysterious "Shadow Snake".
- Annis Lofts – Tansy's mother-in-law and Crookshanks granddaughter.
- Herun Lofts – Tansy's husband and Roland's father. Annis’ son.
- Ammon (Crookshanks) Lofts – Also known as Father Ammon, he is a scale (fence) of stolen goods, selling for much more than he bought. Has houses all along the lower city where families pay rent to live. Shadow Snake victim. Found "Fire Opals" in some of the houses, and had the families evicted to start digging with hired jobless Lowe City residents.
- Rolond Lofts – Tansy's son and victim of the Shadow snake. Was killed over fire opals that Crooshanks refused to turn over to the snake. Was strangled and left for his parents to find.
- Kayfer Deerborn – Original lower city Rogue before Rosto the Piper.
