= First Test =

Book by Tamora Pierce

- First edition
- Author: Tamora Pierce
- Cover artist: Joyce Patti
- Language: English
- Series: Protector of the Small #1
- Genre: Fantasy; young adult fiction
- Publisher: Random House
- Publication date: 1999
- Publication place: United States
- Media type: Print (Hardcover & Paperback)
- Pages: 240 pp
- ISBN: 0-679-88917-5
- OCLC: 39724122
- LC Class: PZ7.P61464 Fi 1999
- Followed by: Page

First Test is a fantasy novel by Tamora Pierce, the first book in the series Protector of the Small. It details the first year of Keladry of Mindelan's training as a page of Tortall.

== Plot introduction ==
Protector of the Small is set in the Tortallan world of Pierce's “Song of the Lioness” and “The Immortals” series/“The Immortals”' quartets. The protagonist is Keladry of Mindelan, a young girl who becomes the first female to train as a knight, ten years after Jonathan of Conté/King Jonathan first declared it legal. The novel tracks the first year of Keladry's training, during which she is only accepted on a probationary basis. Keladry must struggle to prove herself worthy to palace training master Wyldon of Cavall and her fellow page trainees.

== Plot summary ==
In this book, Keladry of Mindelan, known as Kel, faces a tough year ahead to become a page when Lord Wyldon has put her on probation. She finds a way to cope with being in probation and trying to accept her and push herself so Lord Wyldon will approve.

The first Protector of the Small book tells of Kel's fight to become a first year page who is accepted and treated equally. While the laws of Tortall may have been changed to favour gender equality, the reality of entering into a traditionally male domain presents many hurdles to the protagonist. Kel is accepted into the royal page program. However, she is placed on probation for the first year. She is forced to deal with hazing from her all-male peers, including derogatory writing on her walls, the destruction of her belongings, and discrimination from the training master. All the while, Kel is the first female openly attempting to become a knight within the century. Throughout the novel, there is the ever-lurking question of whether the training master will let her continue to train. This is because he, like many, does not believe that women can equal men in combat. While all this is going on, a secret benefactor encourages her with gifts.

When Kel is getting ready for her first day of training, she receives an unexpected gift: a high quality dagger and a whetstone for sharpening. At that time, the dagger and a whetstone was unaffordable except by people of the higher classes. At midwinter feast time, she also receives a powerful bruise balm from a mysterious gift-giver.

Keladry is unashamed of being a woman. Before heading to the first supper after her arrival at court, she changes into a dress, choosing to highlight rather than hide her femininity. She states, "She was a girl; she had nothing to be ashamed of, and they had better learn that first thing." She thumbed her nose at the boys who vandalized her room prior to her arrival and chose to highlight the fact that she was a girl, and she was a warrior.

Keladry hates bullies. After realizing that Joren of Stone Mountain and his friends were bullying first year pages, she defied tradition and started patrolling the halls. She also fights the boys whenever she found them hurting others. Nealan, also known as Neal to his friends (possibly the oldest page in the history of pages) becomes her best friend as well as her sponsor. The other first-year pages gradually accept Kel (as she is known to her friends and family) as she defends them from the bullies.

== Sequels ==
The series is followed by Page (2000), Squire (2001), and Lady Knight (2002).
