= Mastiff (novel) =

2011 novel by Tamora Pierce

- Author: Tamora Pierce
- Cover artist: Jan Gerardi
- Language: English
- Series: Provost's Dog
- Genre: Fantasy novel
- Publisher: Random House
- Publication date: October 25, 2011
- Publication place: United States
- Media type: Print
- Pages: 608
- ISBN: 978-0375838187
- Preceded by: Bloodhound

Mastiff is the third novel in Tamora Pierce's Provost's Dog trilogy, released in 2011 by Penguin Random House. It follows a young Provost guard-woman in a fantasy kingdom called Tortall. The novel, as with all the Beka Cooper books, is written in first person diary form. The actual diary is said to be written in a mixture of Dog code and Beka's personal code.

== Plot Introduction ==
Three years have passed since Beka Cooper almost died in the sewers of Port Caynn, and she is now a respected member of the Provost's Guard. But her life takes an unexpected turn when her fiancé is killed on a slave raid. Beka is faced with a mixture of emotions as, unbeknownst to many, she was about to call the engagement off.

As Beka is facing her feelings, Lord Gershom appears at her door. Within hours, Beka, her partner Tunstall, her scent hound Achoo, and an unusual but powerful mage are working on an extremely secretive case that threatens the future of the Tortallan royal family, and therefore the entire Tortallan government. As Beka delves deeper in the motivations of the criminals she now Hunts, she learns of deep-seated political betrayal and corruption. These are people with power, money, and influence, and they are able to hire the most skilled of mages, well versed in the darkest forms of magic, all of which makes them nearly impossible to identify.

The case takes Beka beyond the city, where she must apply her tracking skills in unfamiliar environments. It also requires her to assess whom she can trust, as the outcome has implications for both her safety and the future of her country.

== Plot summary ==
The book opens in the beginning of June 249 H.E. at the funeral of Holborn Staftstall, Beka Cooper's fiancé and a five-year Dog of the Jane Street kennel. All the Dogs realize that Holborn's impetuous nature got him killed in the line of duty. Beka feels guilty both that she wasn't able to influence him to be more careful and that she was on the verge of ending their relationship. Rosto, the Rogue of Corus and friends, takes care of her that evening.

The next morning, Beka's companion Pounce, a constellation in the form of a cat, wakes her before dawn. Lord Gershom, Beka's patron and the Lord Provost of Tortall, comes with the news that she and her scent hound Achoo are needed on a Hunt. Her partner Matthias Tunstall is at the Peregrine Dock, who will join the Hunt. All that is known is that the Hunt calls for utmost secrecy, a small team, and a scent-hound. A mage magics the Peregrine ship to bounce off the waves, allowing for very fast trips; the ride is so rough that all passengers and crew are tied to bunks/part of the ship, and all but a couple crew members are made to sleep. The ship stops at Blue Harbor to pick up Master Farmer Cape, a Provost's mage unknown to Beka and Tunstall.

The group heads to the Summer Palace, indicating the king is involved as the royal family has been in residence there for a week and a half. The palace is heavily damaged, with many people burned, sword hacked, stabbed, and some even found melted. During the attack, the four-year-old Prince Gareth was kidnapped while the king and queen were away for the evening. Both parents are devastated by the events and reveal that King Roger III is at odds with the Chancellor of Mages (and many other mages and lords) over licensing and taxing mages as well as increasing the taxes on his nobles after the bread riots on 247 H.E. Master Farmer indicates that the protection spells of the palace, which the Chancellor came to renew last month, had instead been shredded. The personal mages of the king and queen, Ironwood and Orielle, were unaware of this damage and are further insulted by the presence of Farmer, as he is not a court mage.

Beka finds laundry with the prince's scent on it and she and Achoo track his trail. They arrive at the beach, where Master Farmer shows he has great talents by creating a light within stones with quartz crystals (for use as a torch) and found two ships recently sunk under the water. Master Farmer, Ironwood, and Orielle raise the ships to shore. Beka and Tunstall search the woods nearby, where Achoo finds the prince's scent again, only for it to end at a riverbank, near the remains of several melted people.

Lord Gershom and Master Farmer, accompanied by guards and Pounce, find Beka's group and are relieved to learn the prince didn't go down in the ships. Beka and Tunstall are given horses and they head back to the palace to consult with the king. Rain comes, which was magicked, and weakens the scent trail of the prince. The royals are informed of the progress before everyone heads to bed. Beka awakes to take Achoo out and finds Tunstall and Master Farmer cooking, as most servants are dead and none of the court know how.

Beka and Achoo head back to the beach, to investigate the ships that were raised. Tunstall finds Beka and Achoo at the ships, where they discover that one of the ships was a slave ship. They also discover powerful mages at work.

Tunstall and Beka are sent to Port Caynn; Farmer later joins them and so does the lady knight Sabine of Macayhill (also Tunstall's lover) joins the Hunt, though Tunstall is still in charge. They receive a lead for their hunt from a Birdie and are taken via Peregrine ship to Arenaver. As soon as the group docks, Achoo finds the scent again and the hunt continues into the Marshlands, where trail ends at burned down bridge.

After making camp, they then go into village for help getting across the water. The locals are distrustful, but recommend to hire Ormer to take them across the water, which takes four days. At the other side of the Marshlands, Ormer heads back to the village and Achoo picks up the scent of Prince Gareth again near the burned bridge. The trail leads them to a trap which Farmer disarms.

Achoo leads them into Queensgrace Castle where the cult of the Gentle Mother has a strong following. Beka and Achoo explore while Tunstall and the rest of the Hunt submit to the orders of the Lord of Queensgrace. Beka encounters a few Birdies who help the Hunt, and Beka discovers some of the conspirators and their plan to kill the king, queen, and Prince Gareth in order to place Prince Baird on the throne with the support of the Crown Mages and assorted nobles.

Leaving Queensgrace, Beka finds the four-leafed insignia of the conspiracy on Farmer's bag and begins to fear there must be a traitor in the group within the Hunt. Beka and the team encounter a variety of traps as they continue to track Prince Gareth. Beka, Tunstall, Sabine, and Farmer get kidnapped by some bandits and mages who had taken part in the kidnapping of Prince Gareth, and all are led to Halleburn Castle where the conspiracy is based. Beka and Farmer get tortured for information, while Sabine turns to the cause of the conspiracy with the promise of marrying Prince Baird and keeping Tunstall as a consort. Farmer gets placed in Beka's cell; they orchestrate an escape to find and rescue Prince Gareth, and they make plans to marry when the hunt is over. Beka and Pounce finds Prince Gareth who is being kept as a kitchen slave, then Farmer catches up, and Sabine, Tunstall, and Nomalla the lady knight of Halleburn rejoin the group declaring their loyalty to King Roger III.

The group leaves Halleburn together easily, and then the group splits in the midst of a fight so Beka and Gareth continue on alone. Then, Beka encounters Tunstall alone and discovers his plan to marry Sabine by becoming Lord Provost to King Baird. Beka and Tunstall fight, and Beka wins, keeping Tunstall alive to face the Magistrates for treason. Sabine, Farmer, and Nomalla reveal themselves to Beka having heard his plans and treason, and Sabine ties Tunstall to a tree so he must face the Magistrates. The new group loyal to King Roger III then returns to the place where Achoo guards Prince Gareth. The next morning, an army attacks Halleburn with mages. Farmer had gotten a message to his master: "Halleburn." Farmer determines that the army is on the side of King Roger III, and that Halleburn, Queensgrace, and Aspen Vale are all being sieged to stamp out the rebellion.

The king announces that both Prince Gareth and Beka's wish was for the end of the slave trade, which he has them sign as witnesses a proclamation ending enslavement in Tortall. With children no longer able to be sold into slavery, it should end within two generations, as current slaves pass away.
