= Magic Steps =

2000 novel by Tamora Pierce

- US hardcover edition cover featuring Sandry's first discovery of Pasco.
- Author: Tamora Pierce
- Language: English
- Series: The Circle Opens
- Genre: Fantasy novel
- Publisher: Scholastic Press
- Publication date: March 1, 2000
- Publication place: United States
- Media type: Print (Hardback & Paperback)
- Pages: 272 pp
- ISBN: 0-590-39588-2 (hardback edition) & ISBN 0-590-39605-6 (paperback edition)
- OCLC: 41468528
- LC Class: PZ7.P61464 Mag 2000
- Followed by: Street Magic

Magic Steps is the opening book of The Circle Opens quartet of young adult fantasy novels by Tamora Pierce. It is preceded by the Circle of Magic quartet, taking place four years after the conclusion of Briar's Book. It portrays the adventures of Sandrilene fa Toren, the noble thread mage and her first experience as a teacher of magic.

== Plot ==
Sandry, now fourteen years old, has temporarily moved out of Discipline Cottage into the ducal palace in Summersea to look after her great-uncle Duke Vedris after he suffers a heart attack. While out riding in the city one morning, she sees a twelve-year-old boy named Pasco Acalon performing a dance for luck over fishing nets. Sandry senses magic in the dance, though Pasco denies that he has any magical ability. Moreover, Pasco’s family are all employed in the city watch, known as the harriers, and do not approve of his ambition to be a dancer.

Vedris and Sandry learn that Jamar Rokat, the patriarch of a wealthy merchant family from overseas, has been gruesomely murdered in his home. Although Rokat’s home was heavily protected with magic, none of the defensive spells were triggered.

Meanwhile, when Pasco is bullied by two of his cousins, he accidentally creates a spell with his movements to protect himself. Finally convinced of his innate talent, the boy goes to Sandry and asks for her help.

Jamar Rokat’s brother Qasam goes to the duke to beg for protection, explaining that the Dihanurs, a rival merchant house in the Rokats’ home city of Bihan, are seeking to eliminate the entire Rokat family everywhere. The duke lends Qasam an armed escort. However, the Dihanur assassins - a married couple named Alzena and Nurhar and an unnamed mage - have a mysterious ability to make themselves invisible and unaffected by magic. They attack the party in the street, killing Qasam.

During the fight, a guard is injured, and Sandry and a harrier mage named Wulfric Snaptrap see a magical “shadow” on his wound. Sandry removes the shadow and puts it aside for later study. Wulfric learns that the source of the shadow is the Dihanur's mage, who is unusual - he does not create magic, but annuls it, making spells useless. Those who work with “unmagic” often go mad, as it negates vitality and energy.

Pasco continues his lessons with Sandry. He struggles with the focus and discipline needed, and Sandry in turn becomes irritated by his distractibility and disobedience, though she grows fond of him. She also finds him a dancing teacher, a retired performer named Yazmin Hebet.

The assassins, despite becoming careless and apathetic from their exposure to unmagic, nevertheless succeed in killing a clerk named Fariji Rokat, his wife, and their two children. When Sandry goes to the scene of the crime, she sees more smears of unmagic all along the street. Sandry and Wulfric cleanse the street, gathering up and storing the unmagic. All remaining members of the Rokat family in the city are taken to the palace for protection.

When Wulfric and Sandry return to Fariji’s home the day after the murder to cleanse it as well, they are attacked by the Dihanurs. Wulfric is slain and the killers escape, though not before Sandry notices that their bodies are tainted with unmagic.

Sandry discovers that the unmagic tends to stick to itself and that her unique abilities allow her to spin and weave it like thread, which gives her an idea for how to set a trap for the assassins. Although Vedris initially refuses to consider her plan, he is shaken when Alzena penetrates the keep on a reconnaissance mission, and he allows his niece to go ahead.

One of the Rokats, a man named Durshan, volunteers to publicly announce that he is leaving the palace and returning to his home, to act as bait. Believing the killers can be caught and cleansed so they can face justice, Sandry weaves the unmagic into a net which she sets up in Durshan’s house. Pasco then dances the same charm of attraction over it that was used on the fishing nets. When the assassins arrive at the house, they capture Pasco but stumble into the net; holding the boy hostage, they demand to be released. Sandry instead spins a thread from all the unmagic in the room. The power has become so much a part of the trio that, when it is suddenly removed, Alzena and Nurhar’s bodies fall apart, and the mage dissolves into thin air.

In an epilogue, Pasco moves into Yazmin’s school to continue his dance training and his magic lessons with Sandry. Sandry visits her former teacher Lark at Discipline Cottage and is surprised to realize that, though she would be welcome to return if she wished, she has outgrown her old home, and it is time for her to take her place in the wider world.

== Publication and reception ==
The book was first published in 2000, one year after Briar's Book concluded the original Circle of Magic quartet in 1999. A review by Janice M. Del Negro for the Bulletin of the Center for Children's Books says the book "serves more as set-up than as a well-developed story of its own" and "The characterizations are less richly layered, relying on the previous series to fill in the blanks".

Kirkus Reviews praised the book's "vibrant language" and "great energy." A review by Ann St. John for Horn Book Magazine notes the "grisly descriptions of the crime scenes and the ongoing murders are shocking" and states "Rather than being weighed down by the dark story line, however, the fantasy emphasizes Sandry's strength of character in the face of danger and focuses on her attempts to find a solution." In a review for School Library Journal, Eva Mitnick observes, "the admirable heroine remains calm, capable, and always ready to giggle" and states, "Violent acts are horrifying but are not graphically described."

It was adapted into an audiobook in 2011 by Full Cast Audio. A review of the audio version by Sarah Flood for School Library Journal states, "Sandry and Pasco are likeable and strong-willed characters, and the full-cast narration captures their spunk and humorous interactions with Pierce taking the role of narrator."
