= Page (novel) =

2000 fantasy novel by Tamora Pierce

- Original Random House U.S. hardcover of the book featuring the title character.
- Author: Tamora Pierce
- Cover artist: Joyce Patti
- Language: English
- Series: Protector of the Small #2
- Genre: Fantasy novel
- Publisher: Random House
- Publication date: 2000
- Publication place: United States
- Media type: Print (Hardcover & Paperback)
- Pages: 268 pp
- ISBN: 0-679-88918-3
- OCLC: 47064516
- Preceded by: First Test
- Followed by: Squire

Page is the second book in the quartet Protector of the Small (1999–2002), by American fantasy author Tamora Pierce, published in 2000 by Random House. It details the training of Keladry "Kel" of Mindelan, the first female page in a hundred years.

== Plot summary ==
Kel, though allowed to continue her training by instructor Wyldon of Cavall, is still not accepted by many of the male pages, and is therefore supported by Neal, Merric, Cleon, and Owen against Joren. At the beginning of the book, Kel hires Lalasa, after her mistreatment by other relatives. Kel also adopts a stray dog who calls himself Jump, and a flock of songbirds. Thereafter the book follows Kel's education, until Lalasa and Jump are kidnapped; whereupon Kel and her friends rescue them. Kel had proved her worthiness of being a leader when she guides her group of fellow pages through the "Battle of the Cliff". Lord Wyldon continues to make life hard for Kel by forcing her to improve her jousting skills, (She called the routine maddening) and made her join the elite page archers group, which Kel does more enthusiastically because if she advances, she gets to "play" with different kinds of arrows. Lord Wyldon also tries to humiliate Kel by making her "leader" of a fighting group while another page leads the other group, and they have a mock battle, which Kel's group always wins.

== Characters ==
- Keladry (Kel) of Mindelan – protagonist; the first [openly] female page in the story's present day.
- Nealan (Neal) of Queenscove – Kel's year-mate and best friend. He has a sarcastic view of the world and would rather study than train.
- Owen of Jesslaw – a year behind Neal and Kel, Owen is an outspoken young boy. He is known for his abounding courage and almost unflappable good nature.
- Merric of Hollyrose – one of Kel's friends.
- Joren of Stone Mountain – Kel's rival.
- Lord Wyldon of Cavall – Kel's training master, and one of her principal critics.
- Lord Raoul of Goldenlake – the head of the King's bodyguard; earlier shown in the Song of the Lioness series.
- Lalasa Isran – Ket's timid maidservant.
