= Shatterglass =

2003 novel by Tamora Pierce

- Cover featuring Tris holding Chime in a glass workshop.
- Author: Tamora Pierce
- Language: English
- Series: The Circle Opens
- Genre: Fantasy novel
- Publisher: Scholastic Press
- Publication date: March 2003
- Publication place: United States
- Media type: Print (Hardback & Paperback)
- Pages: 368 pp
- ISBN: 0-590-39683-8 (hardback edition) & ISBN 0-439-97864-5 (paperback edition)
- OCLC: 50124820
- Dewey Decimal: [Fic] 21
- LC Class: PZ7.P61464 Sh 2003
- Preceded by: Cold Fire

Shatterglass, a novel by Tamora Pierce, is the fourth book in The Circle Opens series. It takes place four years after the Circle of Magic series.

== Plot summary ==
Tris and Niko have travelled south to the ancient city of Tharios, where Niko is attending a conference of mages at the university. Tris, who can hear but not see information carried on air currents, wants to learn to scry using the wind. While exploring the city, she has an encounter with a prathmun, a member of the city’s untouchable caste, who tells her that because of their role in removing waste and handling the dead, prathmuni are considered unclean and subhuman.

Kethlun Warder, or Keth, is a twenty-year-old journeyman glassblower originally from the Namornese Empire. He was struck by lightning the year before, and the damage caused by the strike left him temporarily paralyzed, forcing him to relearn his trade. Tris sees him struggle with a piece he is trying to blow and accidentally infuse it with magic he cannot control. Unknown to him, the lightning strike gave him ambient weather powers alongside his small gift for academic glass magic, and Tris informs him he must learn to control them.

Dema Nomasdina is a mage in the service of the city’s arurimi, or police. He works in Khapik, the city’s famed pleasure district, where entertainers known as yaskedasi ply their trade. Dema has been tasked with finding a serial killer called the Ghost, who has been targeting female yaskedasi and leaving their bodies in important public places. This has outraged the local authorities, not because of the murders themselves - yaskedasi are of low caste and thus unimportant - but because the Tharian religion holds that death is a form of spiritual pollution, requiring priests and mages to perform purifying rituals everywhere a corpse has touched. This interferes with the hunt for the murderer, as the rituals destroy the residues that can be used in magical tracking.

While having his new magic tested at the university, Keth blows a glass sphere that is mysteriously full of lightning. When it clears several hours later, it shows the body of the Ghost’s next victim, left in the Fifth District Forum. The globe is passed on to the arurimi.

As no other mages in the city have abilities related to lightning, Tris becomes Keth’s teacher. She helps him learn to control his magic and move past his fear of storms at the same time as she teaches herself to scry on the wind. Tris and Keth assume the care of a small girl, Glaki, whose mother Iralima was killed by the Ghost. Tris discovers the child has academic magic, and Glaki joins the mages’ meditation lessons. Keth and Tris join Dema in his search for the killer.

As the lessons progress, Keth blows several more spheres showing the Ghost’s victims. The journeyman learns to control his powers better to force the spheres to clear faster, hoping to enable the arurimi to catch the Ghost. Tris takes to exploring Khapik, attempting to find the killer by listening to the wind.

Keth blows a globe which shows a yaskedasu alive but about to be attacked. He and the arurimi arrive in time to save the woman, though the killer escapes. Tris, who has finally found the knack of seeing on the wind, sees the killer about to take another victim but, blinded by the vision, does not notice it is her until he grabs her. She fights back and sees that the Ghost is a prathmun, who tells her the killings are revenge for his yaskedasu mother and ruling-caste father abandoning him when he was born. Tris nearly kills him with her magic, but Dema and Niko, having seen her in Keth’s globe, intervene.

The Ghost is executed by the state. Keth declares his intention to learn investigative magic to help Dema continue to solve crimes, and Tris looks into finding a permanent home and teacher for Glaki. The prathmuni, having been warned by Tris, have mostly fled the city in advance of the other castes’ retribution and are negotiating for better treatment upon their return. Tris muses on the possibility that even a place as ancient as Tharios can change.

== Reception ==
In a review for School Library Journal, Beth L. Meister states, "This fast-moving, action-filled story can stand alone, and is sure to be a hit with Pierce's many fans." A review by Anita L. Burkam for Horn Book Magazine includes, "With a large number of plot elements, Pierce has quite a few balls to keep in the air for most of the book; that a few drop before the end won't bother fans of her cheeky, down-to-earth characters, earnest magical effects, and low-key mysteries."

According to a review by Shelle Rosenfeld in Booklist, "Kethlun and Dema's stories add depth to the plot, and there's plenty of suspense, as well as a social commentary simmering beneath the surface of the story (the human rights of the lower classes are being ignored by the city in an effort to maintain its beautiful facade)." According to Kirkus Reviews, "the pace is too leisurely and repetitive to create much suspense" but the "appealing, well-rounded characters" help compensate for this.
