= Daja's Book =

1998 novel by Tamora Pierce

- Cover of the paperback, showing Daja riding a horse.
- Author: Tamora Pierce
- Language: English
- Series: Circle of Magic
- Genre: Fantasy novel
- Publisher: Scholastic Press
- Publication date: October 1998
- Publication place: United States
- Media type: Print (Hardcover & Paperback)
- Pages: 240 pp
- ISBN: 0-590-55358-5 (hardback edition) & ISBN 0-590-55410-7 (paperback edition)
- OCLC: 37966295
- LC Class: PZ7.P61464 Daj 1998
- Preceded by: Tris's Book
- Followed by: Briar's Book

Daja's Book, by Tamora Pierce, is the third book in The Circle of Magic fantasy quartet, about the further adventures of four young mages as they discover their magic.

== Plot ==
Following the events of Tris's Book, the four children, their teachers and Duke Vedris travel to Gold Ridge Valley, a fief currently experiencing a three-year drought and grassfires in its outlying regions. The children’s magic has continued to intertwine and behave unpredictably, each child’s workings taking on characteristics of the others’. When Daja heats a cluster of iron rods, it responds by becoming plant-like and apparently alive.

A passing Trader caravan expresses interest in purchasing the living metal plant; however, as the only survivor of the shipwreck that killed her family, Daja is considered trangshi, or outcast, and therefore unclean, and the Traders initially refuse to speak to her or even acknowledge her existence. Daja, longing for contact with people from her own culture since her exile, in turn declares that she will not bargain through an intermediary. The Traders reluctantly allow Polyam, a woman who is less useful to the caravan because she lost a leg and an eye in an accident, to undertake the dealings, though she will have to be ritually cleansed once the deal is struck. Daja, the other children, and Polyam engage in the process of bargaining for the plant.

Rosethorn meanwhile quarrels with Yarrun Firetamer, a mage employed by the lady of the fief. Yarrun, like his father before him, suppresses most wildfires in Gold Ridge, and as a result there have been no forest fires for the past thirty years. Not only is it implied that this work places immense strain on the mage, Rosethorn is worried about the buildup of flammable matter in the surrounding woods. Yarrun takes offense and dismisses her concerns.

As the grassfires around Gold Ridge grow worse, the Traders become eager to leave, and Polyam finally concludes her bargain with Daja. On the morning the caravan is to leave, Daja asks to walk with them a short way to spend more time with Polyam before the woman must be cleansed.

At Gold Ridge Castle, Yarrun declares that he has found a way to extinguish the grassfires; however, flames emerge in the woods. As Rosethorn predicted, fires have begun to smoulder in the built-up mast on the forest floor. Yarrun attempts to cast a spell to stifle the blaze, but it fails when the exhausted mage suffers an attack of some kind (possibly a stroke) and dies. The forest fire rages out of control and surrounds the caravan on the road. Daja, who would be protected from the fire by her magic, could choose to abandon them and save herself, but instead joins with her friends and teachers magically. The combination of their skills enables her to contain the inferno and divert it through the earth and into a nearby glacier. This both extinguishes the fire and causes meltwater to begin refilling local lakes.

In the process of embracing the fire to redirect it, Daja accidentally melts the brass on her walking staff, and it fuses to the skin on the back of her hand. When Daja painlessly peels the metal off, it grows back, and the removed metal retains unusual, lifelike properties.

In gratitude for Daja saving them, the Traders have her name restored to the ledgers of their people and offer her a place in the caravan. Daja accepts the former but declines the latter, since it would mean she would have to stop smithing and leave her chosen family at Winding Circle. As a gift to Polyam, Daja creates an artificial leg out of living metal, which enables the woman to walk and feel as she would with a leg of flesh and blood. The children and their teachers declare their intention to return to Summersea.
