= Protector of the Small =

1999–2002 series of books by Tamora Pierce

- First Test; Page; Squire; Lady Knight
- Author: Tamora Pierce
- Country: United States
- Language: English
- Genre: Fantasy, young adult fiction
- Publisher: Random House
- Published: 1999–2002
- Media type: Print (hardback and paperback); Audiobook
- No. of books: 4
- Preceded by: The Immortals
- Followed by: Daughter of the Lioness

The Protector of the Small quartet is a series of young adult fantasy books by American writer Tamora Pierce. The novels explore themes of adolescence (including relationships with family and peers, puberty, and self discovery), as well as feminism and multiculturalism.

The story follows Keladry of Mindelan ('Kel'), a heroine in the fictional kingdom of Tortall. The third series written in the Tortallian Universe, but fourth in the in-universe timeline, it depicts Kel as the first openly female knight (following a secretly female knight in The Song of the Lioness series).

== First Test (1999) ==
First Test was published in 1999.

The story opens in the realm of Tortall. Ten years after King Johnathan IV's decree, women have been legally allowed to train for knighthood, but no one has tried it so far.

Ten-year-old Keladry (Kel) is the first girl who is determined to become an official knight of the realm in over 100 years. Conservative elements of Tortall's nobility are reluctant to let this happen for fear that it will derail training for the boys. One of the realms most outspoken conservatives, Wyldon of Cavall, insists that Kel is put on a year of probation to determine her fitness for the program. While Kel is bitterly resentful of this additional burden atop the many other challenges that she has to face as the only girl in the entire training program, she is determined to prove to him that she is as good as any boy.

Thanks to her only friend Nealan (Neal) of Queenscove and with the assistance of a mysterious benefactor who occasionally sends her useful "gifts", Kel slowly finds her way. Her determination, skill at arms and inborn sense of justice gain her both friends and enemies. Her primary opponent is fellow page, Joren of Stone Mountain, who has been marked by Wyldon as the best page in his year. Joren hates Kel's subversion of traditional practices. His unspoken antagonism takes physical form when Kel declares an unofficial war against the hazing of the first-year pages, something that Joren and his gang revel in. As Kel 'rescues' more and more victims, her circle of allies widens, and others join her in both fighting and friendship.

At the summer camp for pages which takes place at the end of the year, Kel and her friends assist Lord Raoul and the King's Own on a Spidren hunt. Her role in the skirmish that ensues showcases her natural ability as a leader. Her successes do not go unnoticed and at the end of the year Lord Wyldon surprises everyone by allowing Kel to continue to train to become a knight.

== Page (2000) ==
Page was published in 2000.

Kel is now officially a page, but she still has to get through the next three years of training if she ever wants to fulfil her dream of becoming Tortall's first openly female knight.

At the outset of the book, Joren, her archenemy, appears to have stopped tormenting her. Even if Kel is initially distrustful of this apparent reversal, she eventually lets go of her animosity.

While Joren has backed away, another antagonist comes to the fore. Vinson is a member of Joren's gang and also a squire. Kel catches him attacking her timid maid Lalasa Isran. Kel successfully stops the assault, but is left with a dilemma. She is torn between following the rules and reporting Vinson, or staying silent to protect Lalasa's reputation. Eventually, she chooses silence, but this decision weighs heavily upon her.

Despite these internal personal struggles, Kel's aptitude with weaponry and her skills as a leader continue to grow. Over the course of the book, Kel's prowess with the lance, staff and bow is refined, and her knowledge of battle strategy is developed through mock fights. Her expertise serves her well when she and her friends are attacked by bandits whilst camping in the Royal Forest. Despite the overwhelming odds, Kel keeps a cool head and leads her friends to safety until Lord Wyldon and his troops can arrive, once again demonstrating natural leadership abilities.

While Kel makes extraordinary progress throughout the book, her fear of heights torments her throughout her time as a page. Though Lord Wyldon attempts to force her to face her fears by assigning height related chores/punishments, she remains terrified until the day of her page examinations. An hour before the exams, she gets an anonymous message that Lalasa has been kidnapped and left atop Balor's Needle – the highest tower in Tortall. Even though Kel is determined to save her, she knows this means both potentially missing the exams – the punishment for which is repeating the last four years of study – and confronting her own shortcomings. Despite these challenges, Kel climbs up Balor's Needle and successfully rescues Lalasa.

For her bravery, and because of the extenuating circumstances, Kel is allowed to retake the examinations alone; she passes with flying colors and officially becomes a Squire.

== Squire (2001) ==
Squire was published in 2001.

Kel's last hurdle before she can become a knight is spending four years as a squire.

Her new knight-master, Raoul of Golden Lake and Malorie's Peak and Lord Commander of the King's Own, is very different from her original master, Lord Wyldon. He introduces Kel to a new way of life that is both fun and challenging. With his help, she becomes a formidable new force on the tournament field, sending shock waves through the world of young Tortallan knights-in-training, and intriguing young lady nobles, who are exposed to the genuine possibility of women training successfully to become knights.

In this book, Kel learns that a fast, skilled group of warriors known as the Queen's Riders – whose main job is to quickly travel around Tortall and aid various groups of warriors as needed – has, in addition to their main duties, been tasked with map-making. The Queen's Riders are constantly roving around the country, and draw maps as they travel which help improve the accuracy of the maps available.

As Kel travels with Raoul and his regiment, she encounters Neal's handsome cousin Domitan, as well as other interesting folk. When Raoul finds himself pressed into escorting the "progress," a group of noblemen and women who are travelling across the entire realm to celebrate Prince Roald and Princess Shinkokami's wedding, Kel has a chance to reunite with her childhood Yamani friends, including the Princess.

Old friends and foes appear: Neal of Queenscove, Owen of Jesslaw, Cleon of Kennan, and the still-bullying Joren of Stone Mountain. Through it all, Kel never allows herself to forget what awaits her after her night-long vigil in Midwinter of her fourth year as a squire: the Chamber of the Ordeal. All her work eventually pays off and she eventually successfully emerges from the Chamber as Tortall's second Lady Knight.

== Lady Knight (2002) ==
Lady Knight was published in 2002.

Lady Knight Keladry is now an official Knight of the Realm.

As war with the neighboring country of Scanra is declared, Kel finds herself in charge of a refugee camp. While she fears that her district commander, Lord Wyldon, has given her this assignment because he views her combat skills as inferior to those of other men, he disproves this notion. He explains that she was chosen for her post because she is the only knight Wyldon knows that wouldn't discriminate against the poor and disenfranchised, using noble status for power rather than to help. Kel soon comes to realize that these refugees are her responsibility and she is able to be a hero, even off the battlefield, and demonstrates her abilities as a leader independent of any mentors or knight masters.

In her work, she receives help in the shape of her old friends Neal and Merric, the horses Peachblossom and Hoshi, the dog Jump, and her personal sparrow flock. Moreover, she receives the aid of a myriad group of others, including: the Wildmage Daine; Daine's lover, the great mage Numair; Neal's own father, the healer Duke Baird of Queenscove; and a stolid, unusual boy named Tobe who, after Kel frees him from indentured servitude, dedicates himself to watching out for her.

While Kel struggles with her responsibilities and the urge to simply abandon the camp and find a real fight, another obligation hangs over her. Before the war began, she was given a task by the Chamber of the Ordeal: to find and destroy the mage who is using foul, evil magic to create the rat-like, swift-moving, deadly metallic things known as "killing devices." But, tied to the camp, she cannot pursue it. However, as the summer wears on and the war intensifies, Kel crosses paths with that perverted mage and his conscienceless war leader.

At last, her resolve is tested, and she and all of Tortall find out if she is truly worthy of her shield. Kel tricks her guards into letting her slip away from them, and pursue a journey to bring back her stolen refugees. She is quickly accompanied by her friends, and once and for all, given the chance to earn her name as a Lady Knight, protector of the small.

== Characters ==
- Lady Knight Keladry "Kel" of Mindelan: The protagonist of the series, a young noble striving to become the first official Lady Knight in Tortall in over one hundred years. She is the youngest daughter of Piers and Ilane of Mindelan, and has several older siblings. She spent six years of her childhood in the Yamani Islands, where her father, a Tortallan diplomat, negotiated a peace treaty between the two countries. As a result, Kel adopted several Yamani customs, which she continued to practice after returning to Tortall. On her website, Pierce stated that Kel is both aromantic and asexual.
- Sir Nealan "Neal" of Queenscove: Kel's first friend and year-mate in the training program. He is the son of Duke Baird of Queenscove, the chief of the palace healers. Neal has got a very strong healing Gift, which, like his father's, is emerald green. Neal is several years older than his year mates, since he initially studied healing at the university of Corus before deciding to carry on the family tradition of always having a Queenscove knight in royal service.
- Wyldon of Cavall: Lord Wyldon, nicknamed "the Stump" by Neal, is the stiff, conservative training master when Kel tries for knighthood, and is the one to demand a year of probation for her, because she is a girl.
- Joren of Stone Mountain: Joren is an enemy of Kel, and tries to drive her out. He has a group of followers who are against women being knights. He bullies first-pages, claiming that it is making them obedient. In Page, Joren seems to have changed, but it is later shown that this was just a ruse.
- Lalasa Isran: A maid to Keladry, and niece to Gower Isran. Joren hired two thugs to kidnap her, and this made Kel face her fear of heights and overcome them. Once Kel becomes a squire, Lalasa transitions to being a full-fledged seamstress, even opening her own shop in Corus. She closes her shop early everyday to teach self-defense to the city girls.
- Lord Raoul of Goldenlake and Malorie's Peak: Kel's knight-master when she is a squire. He is an old friend of Sir Alanna, and the Knight Commander of the King's Own. He teaches Kel that there is more than one way to help people, explaining that "Commanders are as rare as heroes. They are people with an eye not just for what they do, but for what those around them do as well."
- Tobe: A young boy Kel freed from indentured servitude. He goes on to dedicate himself to Kel, very insistent that someone has to make sure she takes care of himself. And Kel, always one to protect others, lets him do it.

== External ==
- Lennard, John."Reading Tamora Pierce's The Protector of the Small"
- Melano, Anne L. "Utopias of Violence: Pierce's Knights of Tortall and the Contemporary Heroic" (Crossroads: An Interdisciplinary Journal for the Study of History, Philosophy, Religion and Classics, vol 3 issue 2, 2009)
