= Squire (novel) =

2001 novel by Tamora Pierce

- Original Random House U.S. hardcover of the book featuring the title character.
- Author: Tamora Pierce
- Cover artist: Joyce Patti
- Language: English
- Series: Protector of the Small #3
- Genre: Fantasy novel
- Publisher: Random House
- Publication date: 2001
- Publication place: United States
- Media type: Print (Hardcover & Paperback)
- Pages: 399 pp
- ISBN: 0-679-88916-7
- OCLC: 46456256
- LC Class: PZ7.P61464 Sq 2001
- Preceded by: Page
- Followed by: Lady Knight

Squire is the third book in the series Protector of the Small by American fantasy author Tamora Pierce. It details Keladry of Mindelan's (Kel's) continuing quest for knighthood.

== Plot summary ==
Squire tells the story of Keladry of Mindelan's years as a squire, between the ages of fourteen and eighteen. Having passed the "big examinations", Kel becomes a squire without a knight-master. While she becomes frustrated at waiting for offers from knights, her best friend, Nealan of Queenscove, becomes squire to Alanna the Lioness, the first lady knight in Tortall, and Kel's personal hero.

While Kel is disappointed at not becoming the Lioness's squire, she shortly receives an equally prestigious offer from Lord Raoul of Goldenlake, commander of the elite King's Own and a personal friend to the Lioness. As Lord Raoul's squire, she travels with the King's Own and participates in routine duties ranging from chasing rogue centaurs to helping to rebuild villages afflicted by natural disasters such as mudslides. Along the way, Kel acquires a baby griffin from the bandits who kidnapped him from his parents' nest. Due to the high incidence of kidnapping immature griffins for their magical powers, griffin parents attack any human who has ever touched one of their offspring, so this task is not without its dangers.

As knight-master, Raoul teaches Kel the fineries of command, and hones her proven skills in jousting, eventually entering her into tournaments where she jousts against other squires and knights. She jousts twice against Wyldon of Cavall, her previous training master, a political conservative who was initially vehemently opposed to Kel's training to be a knight. After the second time, she meets three girls, two of them sisters, who explain that they wish to train for knighthood as well. Kel gives them some advice, noting that the sisters appear serious about it while the third girl seems more like the type that jumps around from idea to idea.

When a political marriage is arranged for Prince Roald, the heir apparent, the Yamani Princess he is betrothed to turns out to be Shinkokami (nicknamed Shinko), a friend from Kel's childhood years in the Yamani Islands; one of her ladies-in-waiting is Yukimi noh Daiomoru, another of Kel's old friends. Shinko's anxiety about her upcoming marriage, and the prospect of integrating into Tortallan society, become catalysts for the three to reforge their friendship as Kel introduces Shinko to various aspects of Tortallan culture. She also introduces Yuki to her squire friends, and she and Neal strike up a quick romance.

Joren of Stone Mountain is found to be the noble who paid two men to kidnap Lalasa Isran, Kel's maid. He is, however, acquitted with a fine. Kel protests the unfairness of the law to the monarchs and gets them to attempt to change it.

Princess Shinkokami's introduction to the subjects of Tortall provides an excuse for the Grand Progress, a progress of the royal family, nobility, and other notables. Against his wishes, Raoul joins the progress, with Kel in tow. This becomes a chance that lets Kel strike up a secret romance with Cleon of Kennan, and Raoul becomes involved with the commander of the Queen's Riders, Queen Thayet's former bodyguard and right-hand lady, Buriram Tourakom.

Kel's second Midwinter as a squire sees her facing the ordeals of knighthoods of her older friends Prince Roald and Cleon of Kennan (who is at this point Kel's sweetheart). Their age group includes Joren of Stone Mountain, who dies in the Chamber, and Vinson of Genlith, who is punished by the Chamber for all the evil deeds he has done to women, namely by feeling every injury done to them.

On the Midwinter after her eighteenth birthday, Kel is scheduled to undergo the Ordeal of Knighthood, a ritual that determines if a squire is worthy to become a knight. Of all her year-mates, her name is drawn for the last day of midwinter. Kel waits anxiously while all her friends pass their Ordeals, but her anxiety is disproven; she passes the Ordeal and receives her knight's shield after seeing a disturbing vision in the Chamber, as well as a sword from the Lioness, who had been anonymously sending her gifts of weapons and training equipment throughout her page and squire years.

== Characters ==
- Keladry of Mindelan – (Kel, the protagonist) is the first acknowledged female page (now squire) in over a hundred years. She is training with Lord Raoul of Goldenlake as his squire.
- Lord Raoul – Lord Raoul is the leader of the King's Own. He is Kel's knight-master and one of her closest friends. He and the Lady Alanna trained together.
- Cleon – Cleon of Kennan is a fellow squire. Kel finds herself entering into a romantic relationship with him.
- Nealan of Queenscove – (Neal) is Kel's best friend. He travels with his knight-mistress, Lady Alanna of Pirate's Swoop.
- Princess Shinkokami – a Yamani princess, Shinko is set to marry Prince Roald. She and Kel have a friendship that dates back from Kel's time in the Yamani Islands.

== See also ==
- First Test (1999)
- Page (2000)
- Lady Knight (2002)
