= Tris's Book =

1998 novel by Tamora Pierce

- Scholastic paperback cover
- Author: Tamora Pierce
- Language: English
- Series: Circle of Magic
- Genre: Fantasy novel
- Publisher: Scholastic Press
- Publication date: 1998
- Publication place: United States
- Media type: Print (Hardcover & Paperback)
- Pages: 251 pp
- ISBN: 0-590-55357-7
- OCLC: 36695158
- LC Class: PZ7.P61464 Tr 1998
- Preceded by: Sandry's Book
- Followed by: Daja's Book

Tris's Book, by Tamora Pierce, is the second book in The Circle of Magic fantasy quartet, about the further adventures of four young mages as they discover their magic.

== Plot summary ==
Following the events of Sandry's Book, Emelan is left vulnerable, with many of its defenses, including those at Winding Circle, damaged by the earthquake. One night, two nearby lighthouses are destroyed in explosions. Investigation reveals that the explosions were caused by a new weapon called black powder.

Duke Vedris visits the temple and informs Sandry that pirates have begun raiding settlements along the coast. Another visitor is Tris’s cousin Aymery Glassfire, a student mage using Winding Circle’s library. Shortly after Aymery’s arrival, all of the scrying tools in the temple grounds break at once, leaving the dedicates unable to see the future.

The next day, a massive pirate fleet, which had approached under the cover of a masking spell, begins bombarding the temple with black powder weapons and trying to land on the shore. The children help their teachers and the other temple residents in protecting their home.

Briar and Tris wake in the night to find Aymery opening one of the temple gates. When they confront him, Aymery confesses to being in league with the pirates, who are blackmailing him due to his debts. A group of pirates break down the gate, kill Aymery, and begin a massacre. Overwhelmed by her emotions, Tris summons a hailstorm, stopping the raid.

In the morning, the children eavesdrop on the adults, who say that the temple’s defenses will not last much longer and they will have to send the children away. Tris sneaks out and heads for the wall, where, using her anger, grief, and fear to fuel her magic, she creates an immense waterspout and sends it against the fleet. The other children join her. The waterspout spins their powers even more tightly together and they continue to attack alongside Winding Circle’s other defenders. Tris destroys multiple ships and magically locates the pirates' chief mage; she, the other children, and their teachers join together psychically and kill him.

After Tris recovers, she is haunted by guilt for the lives she ended during the fighting. She offers to work in the infirmary, caring for the wounded. When the prisoners leave, Niko wants her to resume her lessons and asks her what she would like to focus on; she says she needs to learn better control, to prevent her powers from hurting people around her by accident.

== Honors and awards ==
- Selection, Quick Picks for Reluctant Young Adult Readers: Young Adult Library Services Association (1999)
- Finalist, Mythopoeic Award – Children’s Literature: The Mythopoeic Society (2000)
