= Daughter of the Lioness =

Book series by Tamora Pierce

- Trickster's Queen, the second book.
- Trickster's Choice; Trickster's Queen
- Author: Tamora Pierce
- Country: United States
- Language: English
- Genre: Fantasy, young adult fiction
- Publisher: Scholastic
- Published: 2003-2004
- Media type: Print (hardback and paperback); Audiobook
- Preceded by: Protector of the Small

Daughter of the Lioness series (also known as the Tricksters series) by Tamora Pierce is a series of two novels set in the fictional Tortall universe. It is centered on Alianne of Pirate's Swoop, the sixteen-year-old daughter of Tortall's legendary lady knight, Alanna the Lioness, who was the subject of The Song of the Lioness quartet. The novels take place approximately 24 years after the last book in the quartet, Lioness Rampant.

== History, politics and culture of the Copper Isles ==
Most of the series is set in the fictional Copper Isles, a group of islands roughly west of Tortall, in the Tortall Universe. They were once ruled over by the native Raka, whose inheritance came from the mother's line, and who allowed the oldest child to inherit, whatever gender. The Raka are dark-skinned folk who live in tribes.

However, the Raka were often engaged in disputes between tribes, and when the Luarin—white-skinned invaders from the Eastern Lands, led by Rittevon of Lenman and Ludas Jimajen—arrived, they were able to conquer the Raka quickly. They killed the queen, her family, and most of the high-ranking nobles. The Raka that remained now either belonged to the Luarin as slaves or had to pay to live on Luarin land.

The Raka wondered why their god, Kyprioth, did not come and save them, and so priests spread the story that Kyprioth had been defeated in the Divine Realms by his brother and sister, Mithros and the Great Mother Goddess. However, hope was returned to the Raka in the form of a prophecy, which promised that a new half-Raka queen would arrive, who was royal to both the Raka, through one well-hidden branch of the last queen's family, and to the Luarin invaders, through the Rittevon line.

When Trickster's Choice opens, the Copper Isles is ruled by an insane king whose heirs include an obese, pleasure-seeking man, a five-year-old boy, and a scheming princess who is determined to seize power through her equally power-hungry husband. The Raka and Luarin have intermarried, and the majority of the population are mixed blood. Social status is often determined by the color of the lioness's skin. (Raka with lighter skins are treated better.)

The Copper Isles is characterized as a place where foods are often spiced with hot peppers and other Asian-sounding goods. There is a lot of jungle, though there are also many wealthy cities. Some Lords and Ladies have plantations, which mirror the plantations the American South had before the Emancipation Proclamation (Raka was treated very badly, and eventually rebelled and overthrew their cruel masters).

== Trickster's Choice ==
Trickster's Choice
- Author: Tamora Pierce
- Language: English
- Series: Daughter of the Lioness
- Genre: Fantasy novel
- Publisher: Scholastic
- Publication place: United States
- Media type: Print (Paperback)
- Followed by: Trickster's Queen

"I proclaim the shallowness of the world and of fashion. I scorn those who sway before each breeze of taste that dictates what is stylish in one's dress, or face, or hair. I scoff at the hollowness of life." — Aly (while teasing her father)

Trickster's Choice follows Alianne, or Aly, of Pirate's Swoop, the daughter of Alanna, the hero of Pierce's first book, Alanna: The First Adventure. Aly's father is George Cooper, Baron of Pirate's Swoop, second-in-command of his realm's spies. Alanna by this time is the Lioness of Pirate's Swoop and Olau, lady knight, King's Champion of Tortall, and a living legend. However, far from wanting to follow in her mother's footsteps, Aly wishes to follow her father's career; that of a spy.

Frustrated with her parents, (who refuse to allow her to become a spy), Aly takes her boat, the "Cub", and sails down the coast, but is captured by pirates along the way. Despite being a pretty girl in a very bad situation, Aly keeps her head, intentionally getting herself bruised and starving herself so that she won't be bought as a sex slave. She also utilizes the self-defense training her father gave her to keep other slaves from bothering her.

The pirates try to sell her as a slave in Rajmuat, capital city of the Copper Isles, with no success. Aly is eventually given away as a general-work slave to the noble Balitang family, which consists of Duke Mequen, his wife Duchess Winnamine, their children Lady Petranne and Lord Elsren, and Duke Mequen's two daughters by his first marriage to Duchess Sarugani, Lady Saraiyu (Sarai) and Lady Dovasary (Dove). (She is later informed by Kyprioth, the Trickster god, that he was the one who kept her from being sold because he wanted her to go to the Balitang family.)

However, shortly after Aly's arrival, the Balitang family falls out of favor with King Oron of the Copper Isles, and are forced to sell most of their slaves and household goods. When it is Aly's turn to be reviewed by a slave matcher the Balitangs hire, a god appears to her and the Balitangs. Aly sees the god Kyprioth, the Trickster God and patron of the Raka, who wagers her a quick, safe journey home and recommends to her father that she begin work as a spy, provided she can keep the Balitang children alive until the autumn equinox. He, posing as his brother—the Great God, Mithros—appears to the Balitangs and tells them to keep Aly as his messenger to them and trust her insights.

Aly travels with the Balitangs to the highlands on Lombyn Isle, where they own a fiefdom called Tanair. There, Kyprioth sends Aly help, in the form of the native crows, who, after agreeing to spy for her, begin to teach Aly their language. At Tanair, Aly also learns of the Raka conspiracy: the native Raka people of the Copper Islands, led by many of the Balitangs' pure-blood Raka servants and slaves, plan to overthrow the Luarin invaders who oppressed them centuries ago, and put Lady Sarai, on the throne. They believe Sarai, whose father is fourth in line to the Luarin throne, and whose mother was one of the last descendants of the old Raka queens, is the prophesied Twice-Royal Queen who will lead the Raka to greatness. Aly figures out the conspiracy and helps indirectly, though she doesn't officially agree to join the conspiracy and serve as its spymaster until the next book.

Meanwhile, many things happen in the Copper Isles. The Balitangs are visited by Prince Bronau, a close friend of the family who has also fallen out of favor with the king, and who flirts constantly with Sarai. One of the crows, named Nawat, transforms himself into a man and begins to work as a fletcher at Tanair. He falls in love with Aly, and despite the fact that she tries to act professionally around him at first, Aly is attracted to him as well. Aly is also visited by Kyprioth, who takes her on a journey in a dream to Rajmuat, to see the death of King Oron and the coronation of King Hazarin, his son from his first marriage.

During this time, Mithros, (the sun god), and the Great Mother goddess appear to Kyprioth and Aly, demanding why their brother is so far from the seas that they banished him to. Aly covers up for Kyprioth, remembering the training she received about lying to the gods and managing to fool the two deities by telling only part of the truth. They leave, and Aly grins at Kyprioth and tells him that he owes her.

Prince Bronau returns to the capital, but politics in Rajmuat change quickly. Before long, King Hazarin is dead of apoplexy, and King Oron's three-year-old son Dunevon is king, with his sister Princess Imajane and her husband Prince Rubinyan as regents. Prince Bronau, who is Prince Rubinyan's brother, attempts to kidnap the new King, and soon there is a warrant for his arrest on a charge of treason. He returns to Tanair to visit the Balitangs, but, when they try and convince him to turn himself in, he brings in soldiers and tries to take Tanair by force. His plan is to marry Sarai, kill the king and, when Duke Mequen is King, force him to abdicate in Bronau's favour. However, the Raka conspiracy, prepared for a fight, defeats Prince Bronau's forces with the help of the crows. In the fighting, Bronau mortally wounds Duke Mequen, and Dove kills Bronau with two of Nawat's specially-fletched arrows.

At the end of the book, Aly's father arrives to take her home, but Aly decides to stay with the Balitangs as they live at Tanair through the winter, before their return to Rajmuat in the summer. She has grown to love the family and wants to help them defeat the mad rulers of the Copper Isles. She does, however, require that Kyprioth give her father his boon (which he used to make Kyprioth release Aly from her wager) back, and scolds him for tricking her into falling in love with the Copper Isles.

== Trickster's Queen ==
Trickster's Queen
- Author: Tamora Pierce
- Cover artist: Lloyd Foye & Associates
- Language: English
- Series: Daughter of the Lioness
- Genre: Fantasy novel
- Publisher: Scholastic
- Publication date: 2004
- Publication place: United States
- Media type: Print (Paperback)
- Pages: Hard cover: 467 Soft cover: 592
- ISBN: 1-86504-740-6
- Preceded by: Trickster's Choice

Trickster's Queen takes place in the spring after the events of Trickster's Choice. The Balitang family returns to Rajmuat, where Duke Mequen's aunt, Lady Nuritin, awaits their return. Lord Elsren is now heir to the throne, and the outer isles are beginning to revolt. Aly has trained a group of spies—her "pack"—who report to her, calling her "Duani", or "boss lady". She also faces relationship troubles with Nawat, who is struggling to find his place in the world of men and puzzled over why she won't mate with him. He is soon sent away by the leaders of the rebellion to fight on the outer isles.

In the city, Aly faces many new challenges. The spymaster of the Copper isles is a man called Topabaw, a cruel man who has become lazy as his reputation has grown. Aly soon destroys Topabaw's relationship with the regents through psychological warfare, and he is executed, to be replaced with a far more inexperienced man, Sevmire Ambau. She also faces opposition from Taybur Sibigat, captain of King Dunevon's personal guards, who is the first to realize that she is a spy. Luckily, Taybur cares only about the King—he is not interested in politics, so long as Dunevon is safe. Dove, Sarai's younger sister, discovers the Raka conspiracy and is allowed to join it, but Sarai remains unaware of it, save for the way the Raka watch her wherever she goes. Finally, Aunt Nuritin is the head of a Luarin conspiracy, which also plots to overthrow the current rulers, but has not yet made a move towards this goal. Aly also receives help; Daine, her adoptive aunt, gifts her with a collection of creatures called darkings through Tkaa the Basilisk, that agree to spy for the rebellion.

The rebellion's first major act is when a powerful member of the Luarin conspiracy, Duke Nomru, is arrested and sent to Kanodang prison. Aly's pack successfully releases all of Kanodang's political prisoners and get them to safety on the outer isles, where several rebellions are now in place. The rebellion continues to spread discord, while gathering popularity and eventually begins to attract the attention of the regents. Noticing Sarai's popularity, they offer her a marriage to Dunevon in an attempt to control her. However, buried in spy reports and plots, Aly fails to notice Sarai's infatuation with Zaimid Hetnim, a young Carthaki healer, until it is too late. The couple incapacitates their servants and elope to Carthak, leaving the rebellion stunned.

However, this failure comes with a blessing—the rebellion now turns its attention to Dove, who, as an intelligent and cool-headed young woman, is a far more suitable candidate for the throne. Shortly afterward, Elsren joins King Dunevon on a boat trip to celebrate the king's birthday—however, a magical storm created by Crown mages destroys the ship, killing the boys and many others, and the regents become the rulers of the Isles. However, with the help of the crows, the darkings and the revolution, the Copper Isles are soon in upheaval—people are rioting, the Raka on the outer isles are rebelling and the Crown's soldiers are spread thin. Even Taybur Sibigat, still captain of the King's guard, has joined the Raka conspiracy after the regents kill his beloved king. Tortall and Carthak stop trading with the Isles, and repeated attacks on slave ships mean that merchants will do anything to avoid carrying slaves.

Aly begins to turn the regents against each other, planting false "proof" that Rubinyan is having an affair, and learns from the darkings that her plot has worked. Nawat returns, confident in his role as a man, and he and Aly sleep together for the first time, then every night. The revolt happens, killing many on both sides, even though the rebellion tries to avoid bloodshed. Ulasim, the rebellion's general, dies killing Prince Rubinyan, and Ochobu, Ulasim's mother, head of the group of rebel mages known as the "Chain," is killed in the fighting. Many of Aly's Pack are also killed. However, the conspiracy succeeds, Princess Imajane commits suicide, and Dove is crowned Queen. Aly tells the rebellion's leaders, including Dove, about her true parentage, then goes on to marry Nawat Crow and becomes pregnant after removing the anti-pregnancy charm, he gave her before mating.

== Characters ==
Throughout the series, occasional appearances are made by many of the main characters from other Tortall books, including Alanna the Lioness, Baron George Cooper of Pirate's Swoop, King Jonathan III of Tortall, Myles of Olau, Daine the Wildmage, Numair Salmalín, Keladry of Mindelan, the Graveyard Hag and Tkaa the Basilisk.

== Series title confusion ==
There is some doubt in the wider community as to the proper title for this series. Although by most online sources it is called the "Daughter of the Lioness" series, there have been several published editions of the books in which this phrase does not appear whatsoever, leading to some uncertainty over whether this can be considered the correct series title. For example, the original Scholastic Australia paperback editions (the first version to be released) do not contain the phrase "Daughter of the Lioness" in any place. Owing to this lack of a title, but the similarity in the names of the books, the series is commonly referred to as "Trickster" or "The Trickster Series". This has made the names "Trickster" and "Daughter of the Lioness" more or less synonymous throughout the fandom.

== Publication ==
Trickster's Choice was published by Random House in 2003, twenty years after Pierce's first book, Alanna: The First Adventure, and was eagerly awaited by her fans. Trickster's Queen followed in 2004.
