= Melting Stones =

2007 novel by Tamora Pierce

- Original Full Cast Audio cover
- Author: Tamora Pierce
- Audio read by: Grace Kelly
- Original title: Melting Stones
- Cover artist: Jerry Russell
- Language: English
- Genre: Fantasy
- Publisher: Full Cast Audio
- Publication date: October 2007
- Publication place: United States
- English publication date: October 2008
- Media type: Audiobook and print
- Pages: 312
- ISBN: 978-1934180129 (audiobook)
- OCLC: 988004442
- Preceded by: Street Magic, Battle Magic
- Followed by: The Will of the Empress

Melting Stones, a fantasy novel by young adult author Tamora Pierce, was released by Full Cast Audio as an audiobook original in October 2007, and was released in print form by Scholastic in the summer of 2008.

The book takes place after the events of Street Magic and the 2013 novel Battle Magic, and around the same time as the 2005 novel The Will of the Empress. It follows characters Evumeimei Dingzai (nicknamed Evvy) and Rosethorn, former travel companions of Briar Moss, in their journey to the Battle Islands to investigate the death of the local plantlife and an impending volcano eruption.

It was Pierce's suggestion that she write an original novel for Full Cast Audio, and when she first heard young actress Grace Kelly (actual name) read the part of Evvy during rehearsals for Street Magic, the author decided to recast what she had already written from third to first person so that Kelly could actually narrate the recording.

Bruce Coville, publisher of Full Cast Audio, served as editor for the text, and Pierce herself directed the recording.

== Plot summary ==
Evvy, Luvo, and Rosethorn travel to the island of Starns, one of several in the Battle Island archipelago. Rosethorn and a Water Temple dedicate are being sent to investigate the strange, sudden contamination of local water sources causing the deaths of plants; Evvy is in disgrace at Winding Circle for fighting with other children there. Since Briar’s departure to Namorn with his sisters, the young mage has absorbed herself in her study of rocks and minerals, increasingly considering herself different from humans and other living things, which she refers to as “meat creatures”.

On the island, the temple visitors are shown around by Oswin, a local man with extensive mechanical knowledge, and Jayat, an apprentice mage. Jayat explains that normally he and his master Tahar tap into lines of power found within the earth, but at the same time as the troubles began, the lines shifted and became unpredictable, making them too dangerous to use.

While the temple group are exploring the island to find the source of the changes, Evvy grows frustrated with her companions and uses her magic to project herself deep underground, against Luvo’s warnings. In a chamber under Starns, she encounters a mass of molten rock spirits. Two in particular, whom she names Flare and Carnelian, are energetic and playful; they show her how they have been trying to get out of the chamber, testing and pushing at cracks in the earth. The contaminated water is the result of poisonous gases exiting these places. The spirits will soon find or force a way out, causing a volcanic eruption, and the island must be evacuated before this can happen. To Evvy’s irritation, Rosethorn insists they must help the islanders before leaving themselves.

While helping Oswin’s family of adopted orphan children pack, Evvy comes across a pond with gas bubbles rising from it. Fearing Flare and Carnelian’s exit is imminent, she returns to the chamber and tricks them into playing a “game”, leading them into a maze of quartz crystals. Luvo helps by making the maze more complex but warns that the crystals will reinforce the spirits’ power, making them even more dangerous once they escape.

Evvy, seeking to escape human interaction, explores the power lines used by Jayat and Tahar and realizes that they are fault lines in the earth. She also discovers that the other magma spirits are looking for Flare and Carnelian, believing that the two young ones are destined to lead them to the surface. Oswin suggests to the stone mage that she might persuade Flare, Carnelian and the other volcano spirits to emerge further away from Starns. She agrees and attempts to find privacy so she can concentrate. One of Oswin’s children, a little girl named Meryam who has become attached to Evvy, follows her, but the older girl, distracted and impatient, shouts at her.

Evvy frees the young spirits and convinces them to travel a short distance along one of the undersea faults, but is too exhausted to force them on further. She returns to her body, hoping that the spirits are far enough away that the evacuees will be safe, though Starns itself will not. However, she discovers that Meryam has run off, and her sister Nory and Jayat followed to try and bring her back. Evvy tells the last ship to leave without her but remains in mental contact with Luvo. Luvo asks for help from the spirits of Starns and the other Battle Islands; with a combination of force and persuasion, and resisting the temptation to melt and merge with the earth herself, Evvy brings the volcano spirits to a vent in the ocean floor a safe distance from the island, where they begin emerging as lava.

Back in her physical body, Evvy finds the other three young people, unharmed, and assures them Rosethorn will return to help them. She then settles in to wait, thinking that perhaps spending more time with her fellow meat creatures will not be so bad.
