= Briar's Book =

1999 novel by Tamora Pierce

- Briar in the sewers of Summersea
- Author: Tamora Pierce
- Language: English
- Series: Circle of Magic
- Genre: Fantasy
- Publisher: Scholastic Press
- Publication date: 1999
- Publication place: United States
- Media type: Print (hardback & paperback)
- Pages: 258 pp
- ISBN: 0-590-55411-5
- Preceded by: Daja's Book

Briar's Book by Tamora Pierce is a 1999 fantasy novel set in the fictional duchy of Emelan. It is the fourth and final book in the Circle of Magic quartet, starring the four young mages Sandry, Tris, Daja and Briar.

== Plot ==
Several months after the events of Daja’s Book, Briar is traveling to Summersea with Rosethorn and Sandry; the latter is pestering him to choose a day to mark as his birthday, which he is reluctant to do.

In the Mire, a slum outside Summersea, Briar finds a friend of his, a girl named Flick who lives in the sewers, has fallen ill with a new disease. Briar and Rosethorn take Flick to a charity hospital called Urda’s House, where they must remain in quarantine until the source of the illness is understood. There they tend to Flick and other patients who arrive with the sickness, which comes to be called the blue pox for the blue spots it leaves on the skin. The pox proves worryingly difficult to treat, as it not only causes a high fever and weakens the infected, but also resists standard remedies such as willowbark tea. Rosethorn and Briar take samples from the patients, which are sent to Winding Circle and used to isolate the pathogen causing the illness.

The numbers of the sick and dead increase. Niko becomes concerned that the pox is spread via contaminated water. Rainstorms buffet Summersea, causing water levels to rise, and the disease spreads into the city beyond the Mire.

At Urda’s House, Flick seems to be recovering, with the spots vanishing from her skin, but her fever spikes suddenly and she dies. Rosethorn and Briar are found to be free of the disease and permitted to return to the temple.

At Winding Circle, they join the team headed by Dedicate Crane in performing in vitro experiments on the isolated pox in search of a cure. Briar, who has the unusual ability to see even small amounts of magic, notices traces of it in the pox serum, suggesting that the illness is not entirely natural in origin.

Niko takes Tris, whose magical sight is even stronger, into the sewers to track the disease to its source. They find it in the home of a mage, now dead, who disposed of several experimental potions in the public water supply. The potions were meant to promote weight loss, and the fever, loss of appetite, and resistance to willowbark were intended.

This information enables the team to make progress. However, a small amount of serum is spilled on Rosethorn, and she becomes ill. An experimental cure is found and administered to her. She seems to improve briefly, but, like Flick, relapses suddenly into a high fever. While being tended by Briar, she has a seizure and dies. Briar, anchored in life by the girls, follows her into death. Rosethorn does not wish to leave the afterlife, but Briar threatens to stay there with her; she relents and returns to life with him, though she has suffered brain damage from the seizure.

A couple of months later, when Rosethorn has mostly recovered her ability to speak and walk, Briar realizes that it is one year to the day since he met her. He decides that he will make that day his birthday, in honour of her.
