= Lady Knight =

2002 book by Tamora Pierce

- Original Random House U.S. hardcover of the book featuring the title character.
- Author: Tamora Pierce
- Cover artist: Joyce Patti
- Language: English
- Series: Protector of the Small #4
- Genre: Fantasy
- Publisher: Random House
- Publication date: 2002
- Publication place: United States
- Media type: Print (Hardcover & Paperback)
- Pages: 429 pp
- ISBN: 0-375-81465-5
- OCLC: 49860196
- LC Class: PZ7.P61464 Lad 2002
- Preceded by: Squire

Lady Knight is the fourth book in the Protector of the Small quartet by Tamora Pierce. This book is Kel's first appearance as a Knight of the Realm.

== Plot summary ==
War with Scanra is declared. Unlike other knights, her commander, Lord Wyldon, doesn't assign Kel to a border post or the army, believing women are inferior in combat to men. Instead, Kel is tasked with managing a refugee camp. However, it is revealed that Kel was chosen for her post because she is the only knight Wyldon believed wouldn't discriminate against those not of noble blood. Kel soon comes to realize that the refugees, torn from their homes, robbed of their wealth and self-respect, are her responsibility. She must feed them, house them, and keep them safe from harm. She is able to be a hero, even outside of the battlefield.

Kel is helped by some of her old friends including:

- Neal and Merric
- horses Peachblossom and Hoshi
- he dog Jump, and her personal sparrow flock.

They are joined by a mixed group of other supporters such as:

- the great mage, Numair Salmalin
- Neal's own fath
- Duke Baird of Queenscove
- Kel's former knight-master Raoul of Goldenlake and Malorie's Peak
- men of the King's Own (including Kel's friend and Neal's cousin Sergeant Domitan of Masbolle)
- Wildmage Daine and Daine's lover
- convict soldiers who have been given the choice to fight in the army or to die at hard labor
- several hundred disillusioned refugees who have received too many empty promises from nobles
- smugglers
- and a young, orphaned boy with wild magic for horses named Tobe.

At the camp, Kel struggles with her responsibilities and the urge to abandon the camp and find a real fight and another obligation hangs over her. Before the war began, she was given a task by the Chamber of the Ordeal: to find and destroy the mage whose necromancy creates the giant, swift-moving, deadly metallic machines from the souls of children, known to the Tortallans as "killing devices." But, tied to the camp, she cannot pursue it. However, as the summer wears on and the war intensifies, the mage and his war-leader draw closer.

After months of hard work with the refugees, Kel feels that they can sufficiently take care of the camp while she is gone for several days to deliver a requested oral report to Lord Wyldon. However, when Tobe is brought into the fort, tired from a long trek from Kel's refugee camp, she knows that something is wrong. She finds out that the Scanrans have captured her people. Kel believes that the children will be used to create metal killing devices that are terrorizing Tortall. Lord Wyldon forbids her to go after them. She is left with a choice: obey Wyldon's orders and leave her people for the killing devices, or go after them and presumably be declared a traitor.

After burying the few dead at Haven, Kel tricks her guards into returning to Lord Wyldon without her, and begins what she believes will be a long journey into enemy territory. Much to her surprise and dismay, she is soon joined by Neal, several of her other year-mates, Owen, Tobe, and members of the King's Own. They follow the path of the kidnapped refugees across the deadly Vassa river and into Scanra. A series of altercations result in the Scanran guards being depleted, and the rescue of the adult refugees and convict guards of Haven. Continuing to track the kidnapped children, they are led to Fief Rathhausak, and a final battle between the Tortallans and the Scanrans leaves Blayce dead, and the people of Rathhausak free from his tyranny. The Tortallans and villagers of Rathhausak return across the border to Tortall. As punishment for disobeying orders, she is ordered to build and command a new refugee camp, known as New Hope.

== Errata ==
There is a minor continuity error between Lady Knight and Lioness Rampant, the fourth book in the earlier The Song of the Lioness quartet, concerning the Chamber of the Ordeal. In Chapter One of Lady Knight ("Storm Warnings"), Kel's former knight master Raoul of Goldenlake tells her that no one has been allowed back inside the Chamber a second time in all of history. This conflicts with events in Chapter 8 of Lioness Rampant ("Crossroads in Time"), in which Jonathan of Conté enters the Chamber a second time for the Ordeal of Kings—his first experience being his Ordeal of Knighthood.
