= The Will of the Empress =

2005 novel by Tamora Pierce

- First edition cover
- Author: Tamora Pierce
- Cover artist: Jonathan Barkat
- Language: English
- Genre: Fantasy
- Publisher: Scholastic Press
- Publication date: November 2005
- Publication place: United States
- Media type: Print (hardback & paperback)
- Pages: 595pp
- ISBN: 1-86504-810-0
- OCLC: 156736150
- Preceded by: Shatterglass
- Followed by: Melting Stones

The Will of the Empress is a standalone fantasy novel by Tamora Pierce, published in 2005 by Scholastic Press. It is a continuation of the story of the quartet series Circle of Magic and The Circle Opens.

Pierce narrates the full cast audio book, released as a 14-CD set in 2007.

== Plot summary ==
Four years after the events of The Circle Opens, Briar, Daja, Sandry and Tris, now eighteen years old, are all reunited in Summersea. Sandry is hurt when the others, changed by their experiences abroad, are emotionally distant and refuse to communicate mind-to-mind as they once did.

Sandry holds a title and lands she inherited from her mother, a Namornese clehame (a rank equivalent to countess). While Sandry lives in Emelan, a considerable portion of the revenue from the Landreg estate leaves Namorn, to the displeasure of Sandry’s cousin, Empress Berenene. When she learns that Berenene has been punishing Emelan economically, Sandry insists on going to the Empire to visit the estate, which is overseen by her relative Ambros fer Landreg. The other three reluctantly accompany her.

In Namorn, the Empress schemes to keep the young heiress from leaving. Two young noblemen are instructed to court Sandry; however, she is far more taken with Pershan fer Roth, or Shan, who is one of the Empress’s favourites. The Empress entices Briar with the prospect of working as imperial gardener, while her chief mage, Ishabal Ladyhammer, tries to persuade Tris to remain in the Empire and practice magic. The Empress also notices and encourages Daja’s attraction to one of the imperial ladies-in-waiting, Rizuka fa Dalach, or Rizu.

Shortly after arriving in Namorn, the mages encounter a mad beggar named Zhegorz. Tris sees that he is not truly mad but, like her, has the gift of scrying on the wind.

Sandry discovers that the Empress has been putting financial pressure on the estate to try and force her return: only Sandry, and not Ambros, has the power to dispute the taxes Berenene has been imposing, leading to a lack of money for vital repairs. The mage is also horrified to learn of a Namornese custom which permits a man to kidnap a woman and hold her captive until she signs a marriage contract.

The siblings gradually restore their previous emotional connections. Sandry grants a divorce and a place in her household to a local woman, a victim of the kidnapping custom who could not petition for a separation in the clehame’s absence; Daja is reminded of her sister’s kindness and reopens her connection. While the pair of them attempt to help Zhegorz manage his condition, Briar admits to Tris that he suffers from a PTSD-like condition caused by living through a war, and they too resume their connection to one another. When Daja begins a relationship with Rizu, Sandry and Tris, surprised and unsure what this will mean for their family, begin communicating mind-to-mind again as well.

One of the young men assigned to court Sandry attempts to kidnap her. Her panic lends her the strength to force open her connection to Briar, and he and Tris rescue her. Enraged, Sandry declares her intention to leave Namorn immediately, as do the other three. Daja asks Rizu to come with the four, but she refuses; Daja and Tris restore their connection when Tris comforts her heartbroken sister. Believing Tris to be the most dangerous of the four, Berenene tells Ishabal to place a curse on the weather mage, severely injuring her and preventing her from leaving.

After Sandry, having learned that Shan is the Empress’s lover, refuses a marriage proposal from him, he arranges for her, Briar and Daja to stay at an inn over which a mage has cast sleeping spells. However, Briar is woken by nightmares of his wartime experiences, and he and Daja reopen their connection and disrupt the spells. Sandry, who has already been taken by Shan, also wakes and frees herself.

The three young mages head for the Namornese border. Tris, still injured but assisted by Ambros, does the same. The Empress sends Ishabal to raise the country’s magical border wall against them but, acting in concert, they are able to bring it down.

Sandry realizes that she cannot properly care for her estate and its residents as long as she is absent from Namorn, and signs over her lands and her title to Ambros. Ambros announces that he intends to use his new position to work for an end to the kidnapping custom. The four young mages, now reunited in spirit as well as body, resume their journey homeward.
