= Circle of Magic =

Fantasy novel series by Tamora Pierce

Circle of Magic is a tetralogy of fantasy novels by Tamora Pierce, set in Emelan, a fictional realm in a pseudo-medieval and renaissance era. It revolves around four young mages, each specializing in a different kind of magic, as they learn to control their extraordinary and strong powers and put them to use. It is followed by another quartet, The Circle Opens, which takes place four years later, and the standalone book The Will of the Empress, which takes place several years after that. Melting Stones and Battle Magic are also set in the same universe, but they feature only Briar.

== Series ==
- Sandry's Book (1997, also published as The Magic in the Weaving). The four recover from their disastrous lives and move to Discipline Cottage. After just starting lessons, the four must spin their magics together to save themselves from disaster.
- Tris's Book (1998, also published as The Power in the Storm). Things are finally settling down and the four have become friends. Then, Tris's cousin, Aymery, suddenly enters Winding Circle. When Tris learns that her cousin is working with the pirates, she and her friends must defend their life from a cutthroat band ruled by the sorcerer Enahar and his sister Pauha.
- Daja's Book (1998, also published as The Fire in the Forging). On a trip to the north, Daja meets her past: members of the very culture that banished her. A foolish mage fails to stop a forest fire, and it is up to Daja to save the clan that turned her away.
- Briar's Book (1999, also published as The Healing in the Vine). A terrible, unknown disease, characterized by blue spots all over the body, has fallen over Summersea. Briar, Tris, and Rosethorn are called upon to help find a cure, only to find it has magical origins. Rosethorn falls prey to the Blue Pox, and Briar must find a way to save her before it is too late.

== Characters ==
- Lady Sandrilene fa Toren – Also known as Sandry. A girl of noble descent with thread magic and the power to weave magic itself. She is of a noble family in Namorn, a country to the north of Emelan, though she does not consider her estates there to be "home". She is the daughter of Count Mattin fer Toren and Countess Amiliane fa Landreg. She is the great-niece of his Grace, Duke Vedris of Emelan and cousin of her Imperial Highness, Empress Berenene of the Namornese Empire.
- Briar Moss – Formerly a street gang thief by the name of Roach. His power is with plants. He bears a scar on his palm from a briar's thorn growing under his uncontrolled power when he was younger, which is how he decided upon his new name when he was given a fresh start. He had two "X" tattoos put on his hands to show he had been caught twice stealing. From the Circle Opens quartet, his hands are tattooed with vine patterns that move and grow around on his skin to hide his "X" tattoos.
- Trisana Chandler – Also known as Tris, as well as "Coppercurls" by Briar for her mass of red hair. A girl from a merchant family who has rare weather magic and some earth magic. Tris also possesses a sharp mind and a temper that can cause her to release weather accidentally, with devastating effects.
- Daja Kisubo – Also known as Daja. A former sea Trader with control over smithing, orphaned in a terrible accident at sea for which the Trader clan banished her. Another Trader clan then returned her Trader pride and allowed her back into Trader ranks because she had saved their tribe. Daja can also control fire and heat, and has been known to weave fire and metal. In The Will of the Empress, Daja falls in love with another woman and is revealed to be a lesbian, making her the only one of the four main characters to be explicitly on-page confirmed as part of the LGBTQ community.
- Dedicate Lark – Has thread magic and is Sandry's teacher at Winding Circle. She and her partner Rosethorn run the cottage at Winding Circle known as Discipline. Lark is also considered a Great Mage at Winding Circle Temple, her magic being with thread and spinning. She is the four young mages' foster-mother when they are moved into Discipline. Lark is a lesbian. She and Rosethorn are a couple in an open relationship.
- Dedicate Rosethorn – Rosethorn, with plant magic, is Briar's teacher at Winding Circle. Rosethorn is also a Great Mage and is tart-tongued. The four youngsters know very well to stay out of her way, but they also consider her a foster-mother. Rosethorn is bisexual and polyamorous. She and Lark are a couple in an open relationship; she also has a more casual relationship with Crane.
- Niklaren Goldeye – Also known as Niko. He is a great mage with Academic magic. His speciality is magic with vision. He is Tris's main instructor. He has been called the Greatest Vision mage of his day.
- Dedicate Frostpine – A blacksmith mage who teaches Daja. His powers are unrivaled by any mage of his kind in the era, save Daja.
- Dedicate Initiate Crane – A rival and lover of Rosethorn who helps to clear the bluepox plague in Briar's Book. Briar stole his first shakkan (a miniature bonsai-like tree used for storing magic) from Dedicate Crane.
- Duke Vedris IV – the ruler of Emelan during the Circle of Magic and The Circle Opens quartets as well as Battle Magic, Magic Steps, and The Will of the Empress. The great-uncle of protagonist Sandrilene fa Toren.
