= Tamora Pierce =

American writer

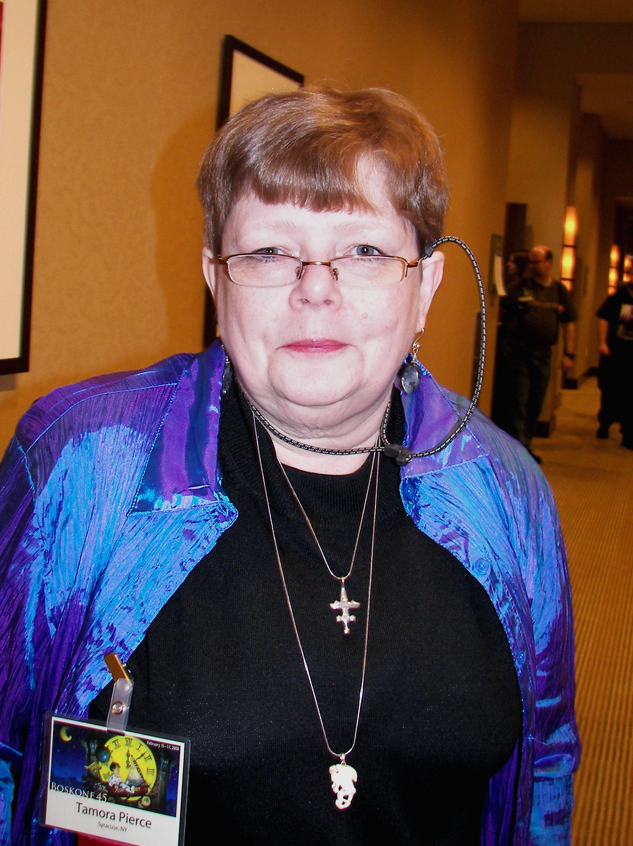
- Pierce at the Boskone science fiction convention in Boston, February 2008
- Born: December 13, 1954 (age 71); South Connellsville, Pennsylvania, U.S.
- Occupation: Writer
- Writing career
- Genres: Children's and young adult fantasy
- Notable work: The Song of the Lioness
- Notable awards: Margaret A. Edwards Award; 2013
- Website: tamora-pierce.net

Tamora Pierce (born December 13, 1954) is an American writer of fantasy fiction for teenagers, known best for stories featuring young heroines. She made a name for herself with her first book series, The Song of the Lioness (1983–1988), which followed the main character Alanna through the trials and triumphs of training as a knight.

Pierce won the Margaret A. Edwards Award from the Young Adult Library Services Association (YALSA) of the American Library Association in 2013, citing her two quartets Song of the Lioness and Protector of the Small (1999–2002). The annual award recognizes one writer and a particular body of work for "significant and lasting contribution to young adult literature".

Pierce's books have been translated into twenty languages.

== Early life and education ==
Pierce was born in South Connellsville, Pennsylvania in Fayette County, on December 13, 1954 to Wayne and Mary Lou Pierce. Her mother wanted to name her "Tamara" but the nurse who filled out her birth certificate misspelled it as "Tamora". When she was five, her sister Kimberly (on whom she based Alanna) was born and a year later her second sister, Melanie, was born. From the time she was five until she was eight, she lived in Dunbar. In June 1963 she and her family moved to California. They first lived in San Mateo on El Camino Real and then moved to the other side of the San Francisco Peninsula, in Miramar. They lived in Miramar for half a year, in El Granada a full year, and then three years in Burlingame.

She began reading when she was very young and started writing when she was in the sixth grade. Her interest in fantasy and science fiction began when she was introduced to J. R. R. Tolkien's The Lord of the Rings, and so she started to write the kind of books that she was reading. After her parents divorced, her mother moved her and her sisters back to Fayette County in 1969, where she spent two years at Albert Gallatin Senior High. When her family moved again, she spent her senior year at Uniontown Area Senior High School, acting, singing, and writing for the school paper. She is an alumna of the University of Pennsylvania in Philadelphia.

== Career ==
While at the University of Pennsylvania, Pierce wrote the books that became The Song of the Lioness quartet. The first book of this quartet, Alanna: The First Adventure was published by Atheneum Books in 1983.

Pierce lived with her husband Tim Liebe (Spouse-Creature) in New York City, with their four cats and multiple other pets, until they moved to Syracuse, New York.

In 2008, she donated her archive to the department of Rare Books and Special Collections at Northern Illinois University.

Pierce was also actively involved in moderating and discussing her novels on a message board called Sheroes Central from about 2001-2006, at which point it was acquired by a third party.

=== Writing process ===
On her homepage, Pierce states she gets most ideas from things she stumbles upon. Her concept of magic as a tapestry of threads comes from her experiences in crocheting, and in her world, all mages are somehow based on British naturalist David Attenborough after watching his nature documentaries. Fantasy novels and Arthurian legend were the base of the worlds she thought up as a girl, and later she added contemporary issues like youth crime and cholera outbreaks in Africa. In general, Pierce states: "The best way to prepare to have ideas when you need them is to listen to and encourage your obsessions."

Pierce draws on elements of people and animals around her for inspiration. The character of Alanna is loosely based on Pierce's sister. Thayet's appearance is based on a friend of Pierce's. Beka's pigeon friends in Provost's Dog are all based on actual pigeons of Pierce's acquaintance.

Pierce first started writing to escape from the drama of her parents' divorce. She wrote fan fiction based on her favorite stories, imitating them closely. Pierce says she decided to write her stories about strong female characters because she noticed a lack of them in the books she read when she was young.

== Awards and nominations ==
Year	Award	Nominee/Work	Category	Result	Ref
2011	Goodreads Choice Awards	Mastiff	Best Young Adult Fantasy and Science Fiction	Nominated	
2003	Locus Award	Lady Knight	Best Young Adult Book	Nominated	
2004	Locus Award	Trickster's Choice	Best Young Adult Book	Nominated	
2012	Locus Award	Mastiff	Best Young Adult Book	Nominated	
2013	Margaret Edwards Award	The Song of the Lioness Series	—N/a	Won	
2013	Margaret Edwards Award	Protector of the Small Series	—N/a	Won	
2000	Mythopoeic Awards	Circle of Magic Series	Best Fantasy Series	Nominated	
2012	Mythopoeic Awards	Beka Cooper Series	Best Fantasy Series	Nominated	
2005	Skylark Award	Tamora Pierce	—N/a	Won	

=== Accolades ===
Year-end lists
Year	Publication	Work	Category	Result	Ref
2012	NPR	Circle of Magic Series	100 Best-Ever Teen Novels	86	
2012	NPR	The Immortals Series	100 Best-Ever Teen Novels	83	
2012	NPR	Trickster's Choice Duology	100 Best-Ever Teen Novels	81	
2012	NPR	The Song of the Lioness Series	100 Best-Ever Teen Novels	50	
2018	Paste	Trickster's Queen	The 50 Best Fantasy Books of the 21st Century (So Far)	17	
2019	Paste	Trickster's Choice Duology	10 Exceptional Audiobooks Written and Narrated by Women	4	
2020	Time	Alanna: The First Adventure	100 Best Fantasy Books of All Time	—N/a	

== Merchandise ==
In November 2018, the first line of officially licensed merchandise was created in partnership with Dual Wield Studio: pins, apparel and accessories developed in collaboration with creators from the Tamora Pierce fanbase. The collection expanded in 2020 to include a rendition of the map of Tortall.

At the end of 2023, Dual Wield Studio announced a new collection celebrating the 40th anniversary of Alanna: The First Adventure.

On the 23rd of January 2025, Illumicrate announced a 10-year Illumicrate Anniversary special edition of Tamora Pierce's Song of the Lioness Quartet. Following the success of that set, on March 18th 2026 Illumicrate then announced a special edition of the Protector of the Small Quartet.
