= Margaret A. Edwards Award =

Annual literary award for lifetime achievement in young adult literature

- Awarded for: "significant and lasting contribution to young adult literature"
- Country: United States
- Presented by: Young Adult Library Services Association, a division of the American Library Association
- First award: 1988
- Website: ala.org/yalsa/edwards

The Margaret A. Edwards Award is an American Library Association (ALA) literary award that annually recognizes an author and "a specific body of his or her work, for significant and lasting contribution to young adult literature". It is named after Margaret A. Edwards (1902–1988), the longtime director of young adult services at Enoch Pratt Free Library in Baltimore.

The award was inaugurated in 1988 as the biennial "School Library Journal Young Adult Author Award/Selected and Administered by the American Library Association's Young Adult Services Division". After 1990, it was renamed and made annual. (Note: S. E. Hinton received the first, biennial "Young Adult Services Division/School Library Journal Author Achievement Award", as planned. Richard Peck received the second in 1990, and the last one in that it was renamed and made annual that year. In 1991 Robert Cormier was the called the "third recipient of the Margaret A. Edwards Award". "1988 Margaret A. Edwards Award Winner". YALSA. ALA. Retrieved 2013-03-15. "1990 Margaret A. Edwards Award Winner". YALSA. ALA. Retrieved 2013-03-15. "1991 Margaret A. Edwards Award Winner". YALSA. ALA. Retrieved 2013-03-15.) It continues to be sponsored by School Library Journal and administered by the Young Adult Library Services Association, descendant of YASD. The winner is announced during the ALA midwinter meeting and the citation and $2000 cash prize are presented at a luncheon during the ALA annual conference (June 27 – July 2 in 2013).

== History and criteria ==
The "young adult" class of books developed in library collections and publisher promotions, and young adult literature became a "respected field of study", in the second half of the twentieth century. When School Library Journal initiated the award for YA writers, the ALA awards program recognized the YA class only by annual lists of recommended books, the Best Books for Young Adults and a list "for the reluctant YA reader". (Indeed, the Printz Award for the year's best book was established only in 1999.) Chief editor Lillian N. Gerhardt determined that SLJ should merely sponsor the award and recruited the ALA Young Adult Services Division to administer it.

The official name of the award approved in 1986 was unusually long even with initialisms, "The SLJ Young Adult Author Award/Selected and Administered by the ALA's YASD". In the 1988 and 1990 award citations as presented online decades later, it is called the "Young Adult Services Division/School Library Journal Author Achievement Award". (Note: annual) During the third cycle it was made annual and renamed for the recently deceased Edwards. (Note: annual)

As of the fourth cycle, 1991/1992, the committee was charged to select "a living author or co-author whose book or books, over a period of time, have been accepted by young people as an authentic voice that continues to illuminate their experiences and emotions, giving insight into their lives." Among other specific criteria, the body of work should have "acceptable literary quality" and be "currently popular with a wide range of young adults in the many different parts of the country". Furthermore, the winner must "agree to personally accept the award at the following Annual Conference", about five months after the selection.

SLJ editor Gerhardt covered the award at least once, in an editorial at the time of inaugural presentation to S. E. Hinton (June 1988). For some time beginning 1990, the June issue of SLJ covered the current award and carried an interview with the preceding winner.

== Winners ==
The honored writers have been natives and lifelong residents of the United States except Anne McCaffrey, Terry Pratchett, Susan Cooper, and Markus Zusak. (Note: Anne McCaffrey (1999) migrated from the U.S. to Ireland in 1970 after writing three of her cited works and became a citizen in 1982. Susan Cooper (2012) migrated from England to America after writing one of her cited works. Sir Terry Pratchett (2011) was a native and lifelong resident of England. Markus Zusak (2014) is a native and resident of Australia.)

Edwards Award winners and cited works
Year	Author	Cited works	Ref.
1988	S. E. Hinton	The Outsiders (1967); That Was Then This Is Now (1971); Rumble Fish (1975); Tex (1979)	
1989	(no award)		
1990	Richard Peck	Are You in the House Alone? (1976); The Ghost Belonged to Me (1976); Ghosts I Have Been (1977); Father Figure (1978); Secrets of the Shopping Mall (1979); Remembering the Good Times (1985)	
1991	Robert Cormier	The Chocolate War (1974); I Am the Cheese (1977); After the First Death (1979)	
1992	Lois Duncan	Chapters, My Growth as a Writer (1982 autobiography); Ransom (1966); I Know What You Did Last Summer (1973); Summer of Fear (1976); Killing Mr. Griffin (1978); The Twisted Window (1987)	
1993	M. E. Kerr	Dinky Hocker Shoots Smack! (1972); Gentlehands (1978); Me Me Me Me Me: Not a Novel (1983); Night Kites (1986)	
1994	Walter Dean Myers	Hoops (1983); Motown and Didi (1985); Fallen Angels (1988); Scorpions (1988)	
1995	Cynthia Voigt	Homecoming (1981); Dicey's Song (1982); A Solitary Blue (1983); Building Blocks (1984); The Runner (1985); Jackaroo (1985); Izzy, Willy-Nilly (1986)	
1996	Judy Blume	Forever... (1975)	
1997	Gary Paulsen	Dancing Carl (1983); Hatchet (1987); The Crossing (1987); The Winter Room (1989); Canyons (1990); Woodsong (1990)	
1998	Madeleine L'Engle	Meet the Austins (1960); A Wrinkle in Time (1962); A Swiftly Tilting Planet (1978); A Ring of Endless Light (1980)	
1999	Anne McCaffrey	Dragonflight (1968); The Ship Who Sang (1969); Dragonquest (1970); Dragonsong (1976); Dragonsinger (1977); The White Dragon (1978); Dragondrums (1979)	
2000	Chris Crutcher	Running Loose (1983); Stotan! (1986); The Crazy Horse Electric Game (1987); Chinese Handcuffs (1989); Athletic Shorts: Six Short Stories (1991); Staying Fat for Sarah Byrnes (1993)	
2001	Robert Lipsyte	The Contender (1967); The Brave (1991); The Chief (1993); One Fat Summer (1977)	
2002	Paul Zindel	The Effect of Gamma Rays on Man-in-the-Moon Marigolds: A Drama in Two Acts (1965); The Pigman (1968); My Darling, My Hamburger (1969); The Pigman's Legacy (1980); The Pigman & Me (1992)	
2003	Nancy Garden	Annie on My Mind (1982)	
2004	Ursula K. Le Guin	A Wizard of Earthsea (1968); The Left Hand of Darkness (1969); The Tombs of Atuan (1971); The Farthest Shore (1972); The Beginning Place (1980); Tehanu (1990)	
2005	Francesca Lia Block	Weetzie Bat (1989); Witch Baby (1991); Cherokee Bat and the Goat Guys (1992); Missing Angel Juan (1993); Baby Be-Bop (1995)	
2006	Jacqueline Woodson	I Hadn't Meant to Tell You This (1994); From the Notebooks of Melanin Sun (1997); If You Come Softly (1998); Lena (1999); Miracle's Boys (2000)	
2007	Lois Lowry	The Giver (1993)	
2008	Orson Scott Card	Ender's Game (1985); Ender's Shadow (1999)	
2009	Laurie Halse Anderson	Speak (1999); Fever, 1793 (2002); Catalyst (2003)	
2010	Jim Murphy	The Great Fire (1995); A Young Patriot: The American Revolution as Experienced by One Boy (1996); The Long Road to Gettysburg (1992); Blizzard! The Storm That Changed America (2000); An American Plague: The True and Terrifying Story of the Yellow Fever Epidemic of 1793 (2003)	
2011	Terry Pratchett	The Amazing Maurice and His Educated Rodents (2001); The Wee Free Men (2003); A Hat Full of Sky (2004); Going Postal (2004); The Colour of Magic (1983); Guards! Guards! (1989); Equal Rites (1987); Mort (1987); Small Gods (1992)	
2012	Susan Cooper	The Dark Is Rising Sequence (first omnibus edition, 1984); Over Sea, Under Stone (1965); The Dark Is Rising (1968); Greenwitch (1974); The Grey King (1975); Silver on the Tree (1977)	
2013	Tamora Pierce	The Song of the Lioness; Alanna: The First Adventure (1983); In the Hand of the Goddess (1984); The Woman Who Rides Like a Man (1986); Lioness Rampant (1988); Protector of the Small; First Test (1999); Page (2000); Squire (2001); Lady Knight (2002)	
2014	Markus Zusak	The Book Thief (2006); Fighting Ruben Wolfe (2001); Getting the Girl (2001); I Am the Messenger (2002)	
2015	Sharon M. Draper	Tears of a Tiger (1994); Forged by Fire (1997); Darkness Before Dawn (2001); Battle of Jericho (2004); Copper Sun (2006); November Blues (2007)	
2016	David Levithan	Boy Meets Boy (2003); The Realm of Possibility (2004); Wide Awake (2006); Nick and Norah's Infinite Playlist (2006); How They Met, and Other Stories (2008); Love Is the Higher Law (2009)	
2017	Sarah Dessen	Keeping the Moon (1999); Dreamland (2000); This Lullaby (2002); The Truth About Forever (2004); Just Listen (2006); Along for the Ride (2009); What Happened to Goodbye (2011)	
2018	Angela Johnson	Toning the Sweep (1993); Heaven (1998); Looking for Red (2002); The First Part Last (2003); Bird (2004); Sweet, Hereafter (2010)	
2019	M. T. Anderson	Feed (2002); The Astonishing Life of Octavian Nothing, Traitor to the Nation, Volume 1: The Pox Party (2006); The Astonishing Life of Octavian Nothing, Traitor to the Nation, Volume 2: The Kingdom of Waves (2008)	
2020	Steve Sheinkin	Bomb: The Race to Build—and Steal—the World's Most Dangerous Weapon (2012); The Port Chicago 50: Disaster, Mutiny, and the Fight for Civil Rights (2014); The Notorious Benedict Arnold: A True Story of Adventure, Heroism, & Treachery (2010)	
2021	Kekla Magoon	X: A Novel (2015); How It Went Down (2014); The Rock and the River (2009); Fire in the Streets (2012)	
2022	A. S. King	Ask the Passengers (2012); Glory O’Brien’s History of the Future (2014); Please Ignore Vera Dietz (2010)	
2023	Jason Reynolds	Long Way Down (2017); All American Boys (2015); When I Was the Greatest (2014)	
2024	Neal Shusterman	The Arc of the Scythe: Scythe (2016), Thunderhead (2018) and The Toll (2019); Bruiser (2010); Challenger Deep (2015); Everlost (2006); Full Tilt (2003); The Schwa Was Here (2004)	
2025	Tiffany D. Jackson	Allegedly (2017); Monday's Not Coming (2018); Let Me Hear a Rhyme (2019); Grown (2020); The Awakening of Malcolm X (2021); Blackout (2021); White Smoke (2021)	
2026	Candace Fleming	Our Eleanor: A Scrapbook Look at Eleanor Roosevelt's Remarkable Life (2005); The Great and Only Barnum: The Tremendous, Stupendous Life of Showman P.T. Barnum (2009); Amelia Lost: The Life and Disappearance of Amelia Earhart (2011); The Family Romanov: Murder, Rebellion, and the Fall of Imperial Russia (2014); Presenting Buffalo Bill: The Man Who Invented the Wild West (2016); The Rise and Fall of Charles Lindbergh (2020); Crash From Outer Space: Unraveling the Mystery of Flying Saucers, Alien Beings, and Roswell (2022); Murder Among Friends: How Leopold and Loeb Tried to Commit the Perfect Crime (2022)	

== Multiple awards ==
Candace Fleming, Jacqueline Woodson, and Walter Dean Meyers have won both the Edwards Award and the Children's Literature Legacy Award, which the ALA children's division (ALSC) awards for "substantial and lasting contributions to children's literature" (from 1954, now annual).

Four Edwards winners have been selected by ALSC to deliver its annual May Hill Arbuthnot Lecture: Susan Cooper in 2001, Ursula K. Le Guin in 2004, Walter Dean Myers in 2009, and Lois Lowry in 2011. ALSC considers the Arbuthnot selection, inaugurated in 1970, another career award for contribution to children's literature. The lecturer prepares and delivers—currently about 16 months after selection—"a paper considered to be a significant contribution to the field of children's literature", which is also published in the ALSC journal.

== See also ==
- Michael L. Printz Award, ALA book award for young-adult literature
- Children's Literature Legacy Award, ALA lifetime award for children's literature
- List of ALA awards
