= Orbis Pictus Award =

American literary award for children's nonfiction books

- Awarded for: Excellence in the writing of nonfiction for children
- Country: United States
- Presented by: National Council of Teachers of English
- First award: 1990
- Website: ncte.org/awards/orbis-pictus-award-nonfiction-for-children/

The Orbis Pictus Award for Outstanding Nonfiction for Children recognizes books which demonstrate excellence in the "writing of nonfiction for children." It is awarded annually by the National Council of Teachers of English to one American book published the previous year. Up to five titles may be designated as Honor Books. The award is named after the book considered to be the first picture book for children, Orbis Pictus (The World in Pictures), by John Amos Comenius, which was published in 1657. The award has recognized one book annually without exception since it was inaugurated in 1990.

== Criteria ==
- The book must be "nonfiction literature which has as its central purpose the sharing of information". Biographies are welcome, but not "textbooks, historical fiction, folklore, or poetry".
- The book must have been published during the previous calendar year in the United States.
- The book must meet the literary criteria of accuracy, organization, design and style.
- Additionally, the book "should be useful in classroom teaching grades K-8, should encourage thinking and more reading, model exemplary expository writing and research skills, share interesting and timely subject matter, and appeal to a wide range of ages."

== Recipients ==
Orbis Pictus Award winners
Year	Title	Writer	Illustrator	Ref.
1990	The Great Little Madison	Jean Fritz		
1991	Franklin Delano Roosevelt	Russell Freedman		
1992	Flight: The Journey of Charles Lindbergh	Robert Burleigh	Mike Wimmer	
1993	Children in the Dust Bowl: The True Story of the School at Weedpatch Camp	Jerry Stanley		
1994	Across America on an Emigrant Train	Jim Murphy		
1995	Safari Beneath the Sea: The Wonder World of the North Pacific Coast	Diane Swanson		
1996	The Great Fire	Jim Murphy		
1997	Leonardo da Vinci	Diane Stanley		
1998	An Extraordinary Life: The Story of a Monarch Butterfly	Laurence Pringle	Bob Marstall	
1999	Shipwreck at the Bottom of the World: The Extraordinary True Story of Shackleton and the Endurance	Jennifer Armstrong		
2000	Through My Eyes	Ruby Bridges		
2001	Hurry Freedom: African Americans in Gold Rush California	Jerry Stanley		
2002	Black Potatoes: The Story of the Great Irish Famine, 1845-1850	Susan Campbell Bartoletti		
2003	When Marian Sang: The True Recital of Marian Anderson: The Voice of a Century	Pam Muñoz Ryan	Brian Selznick	
2004	An American Plague: The True and Terrifying Story of the Yellow Fever Epidemic of 1793	Jim Murphy		
2005	York's Adventures with Lewis and Clark: An African-American's Part in the Great Expedition	Rhoda Blumberg		
2006	Children of the Great Depression	Russell Freedman		
2007	Quest for the Tree Kangaroo: An Expedition to the Cloud Forest of New Guinea	Sy Montgomery	Nic Bishop (photos)	
2008	M.L.K.: Journey of a King	Tonya Bolden		
2009	Amelia Earhart: The Legend of the Lost Aviator	Shelley Tanaka	David Craig	
2010	The Secret World of Walter Anderson	Hester Bass	E. B. Lewis	
2011	Ballet for Martha: Making Appalachian Spring	Jan Greenberg and Sandra Jordan	Brian Floca	
2012	Balloons over Broadway: The True Story of the Puppeteer of Macy's Parade	Melissa Sweet		
2013	Monsieur Marceau: Actor without Words	Leda Schubert	Gérard DuBois	
2014	A Splash of Red: The Life and Art of Horace Pippin	Jen Bryant	Melissa Sweet	
2015	The Family Romanov: Murder, Rebellion & the Fall of Imperial Russia	Candace Fleming		
2016	Drowned City: Hurricane Katrina & New Orleans	Don Brown	Don Brown	
2017	Some Writer!: The Story of E.B. White	Melissa Sweet	Melissa Sweet	
2018	Grand Canyon	Jason Chin	Jason Chin	
2019	Between the Lines: How Ernie Barnes Went from the Football Field to the Art Gallery	Sandra Neil Wallace	Bryan Collier	
2020	A Place to Land: Martin Luther King Jr. and the Speech that Inspired a Nation	Barry Wittenstein	Jerry Pinkney	
2021	Above the Rim: How Elgin Baylor Changed Basketball	Jen Bryant	Frank Morrison	
2022	Nina: A Story of Nina Simone	Traci N. Todd	Christian Robinson	
2023	Blue: A History of the Color as Deep as the Sea and as Wide as the Sky	Nana Ekua Brew-Hammond	Daniel Minter	
2024	Border Crossings	Sneed B. Collard III	Howard Gray	
2025	Stealing Little Moon: The Legacy of the American Indian Boarding Schools	Dan SaSuWeh Jones		
2026	Just in Case: Saving Seeds in the Svalbard Global Seed Vault	Megan Clendenan	Brittany Cicchese	

=== Multiple awards ===
Five writers have won the Orbis Pictus Award more than once.

- Jim Murphy, 1994, 1996, and 2004
- Melissa Sweet, 2012, 2014 and 2017
- Russell Freedman, 1991 and 2006
- Jerry Stanley, 1993 and 2001
- Jen Bryant, 2014 and 2021
