= Dangerous Angels =

Young adult fiction series by Francesca Lia Block

- First edition
- Author: Francesca Lia Block
- Cover artist: Suza Scalora
- Language: English
- Genre: Young adult fiction
- Publisher: Harper Collins Publishers
- Publication date: 1998
- Publication place: USA
- Media type: Print (paperback, e-book)
- Pages: 478 (1st edition)
- ISBN: 0-06-440697-0
- OCLC: 526057852

Dangerous Angels, also known as the Weetzie Bat series, is a young adult fiction series by Francesca Lia Block. The series consists of seven novels: Weetzie Bat, Witch Baby, Cherokee Bat and the Goat Guys, Missing Angel Juan, Baby Be-Bop, Necklace of Kisses and Pink Smog: Becoming Weetzie Bat. The books follow main character, Weetzie Bat and her friends and family members, who all live in Los Angeles.

The books include supernatural elements such as witches, genies, and ghosts, and has been described as magical realism or mythpunk.

The series title first appeared on the omnibus edition of the first five books, Dangerous Angels, first published in 1998. . The omnibus edition was reprinted in 2007 and again in 2010.

The novel series have won multiple awards such as the 1986 Shrout Fiction Award and the 1986 Emily Chamberlain Cook Poetry Award.

== Plot summary ==
- Weetzie Bat (1989): Weetzie Bat meets Dirk, who is gay, at school, and they become best friends. Together they have adventures around Los Angeles, comforting each other when they get hurt on their quests to find their ducks, or soulmates. Dirk's Grandma Fifi gives Weetzie a genie lamp which grants her her three wishes and their lives change forever.
- Witch Baby (1991): Witch Baby is a purple-eyed girl who lives with Weetzie Bat. My-Secret-Agent-Lover-Man and the rest of the family do not know where she belongs in the world. Tired of tormenting her sister, Cherokee, Witch Baby meets a boy named Angel Juan who she instantly knows is her soulmate and through him, realizes what a family should be. She goes on a quest to find her mother in hopes of finding out where she belongs, only to find out that her mother does not care about her. In the end, she misses her family and realizes it is with them that she belongs.
- Cherokee Bat and the Goat Guys (1992): The adults in the family are away filming their new movie, leaving Cherokee to look after Witch Baby, who misses Angel Juan so desperately that she has locked herself in the shed refusing to eat. To lure her out, Cherokee makes a pair of wings which transform Witch Baby. The girls decide to start a band with Angel Juan and Raphael, but when they are to perform they all freeze up. Cherokee makes the rest of the band members magical items that make them very popular until they get caught up in drugs, sex, and jealousy. Cherokee takes away the magical gifts after realizing the effects they have had, and the band re-examines their choices.
- Missing Angel Juan (1993): Angel Juan leaves for New York City and Witch Baby desperately misses him. When he stops writing to her, she knows something has happened to him. She goes in search of him, staying at the apartment of Weetzie Bat's deceased father, Charlie Bat, which is also haunted by him. Together, Witch Baby and the ghost of Charlie Bat trace Angel Juan to a ‘man’ named Cake, whom she must rescue Angel Juan from without getting captured as well.
- Baby Be-Bop (1995): A prequel to the other stories, the book focuses on Dirk's life before meeting Weetzie Bat. While living with Grandma Fifi in high school, Dirk struggles with his sexuality and how to come out to Pup, his best friend whom he thinks is his soulmate. Though Pup feels the same, he refuses to come out and starts dating a girl, leaving Dirk heartbroken. After being beaten up by homophobes, he starts dreaming of his ancestors, who help him come to terms with who he is through their life stories.
- Necklace of Kisses (2005): Disillusioned by adult life and a passionless marriage, Weetzie Bat moves to LA's Pink Hotel to find herself. There, she meets a variety of supernatural characters and regains her passion for life.
- Pink Smog (2012): This prequel novel describes Weetzie Bat's life as a preteen, when she was still known as Louise Bat.

== Major themes ==
The main theme throughout all of the Dangerous Angels stories is "tolerance through love". Cherokee Bat and the Goat Guys is about the importance of loved ones and the natural and spiritual worlds. Witch Baby's story is about the "danger of denying life's pain". Weetzie Bat is a transcendent coming-of-age story. The theme of Missing Angel Juan is stated by Michael Cart: "love, in its infinite varieties, is both humankind's natural estate and heart-magic strong enough to redeem any loss". In Baby Be-Bop, the theme is finding love for oneself and the book is meant as "a safety net of words for readers longing to feel at home with themselves".

== Literary significance and reception ==
Anne Osborn says of Weetzie Bat that "Weetzie and her friends live like the lilies of the field, yet their responsibility to each other and their love for the baby show a sweet grasp of the realities that matter".

In 2005, Block received the Margaret Edwards Award "for outstanding contributions to young adult readers", for the Weetzie Bat books.

=== Baby Be-Bop controversy ===
In June 2009, Block's book Baby Be-Bop, which deals with the life of a gay teenager, was part of a controversy in West Bend, Wisconsin, where several parents' groups insisted that the book, among others, be removed from the local public library and publicly burned.

== Awards ==
Awards	Year	Result
Shrout Fiction Award	1986	Winner
Emily Chamberlain Cook Poetry Award	1986	Winner
Best Books of the Year Citation ALA	1986	Winner
YASD, Best Book Award, Recommended Books for Reluctant Young-Adult Readers	1989	Winner
Phoenix Award	2009	Winner
Recommended Books for Reluctant Young-Adult Readers,	1990	
ALA Best Books of the Year	1991	Winner
Recommended Books for Reluctant Young Adult Readers	1991	
