= Angela Johnson (writer) =

American children's book author and poet (born 1961)

- Born: June 18, 1961 (age 65); Tuskegee, Alabama
- Education: Kent State University
- Writing career
- Notable awards: Ezra Jack Keats New Writer Award (1991); Coretta Scott King Award (1994, 1999, 2004); MacArthur Fellow (2003); Michael L. Printz Award (2004); Margaret A. Edwards Award (2018)

Angela Johnson (born June 18, 1961) is an American writer of children's books and poetry, with over 40 books to her credit since beginning her writing career in 1989. Her children's picture books are simple yet poetic stories about African-American families, friendships, and common childhood experiences such as moving. Her books for older children revolve around similar themes but also explore deeper issues such as teen pregnancy and divorce. Her characters are realistic and the treatment sensitive, positive, and hopeful. Many of Johnson's books have connections to Alabama and Alabama history.

== Early life ==
Johnson was born in Tuskegee, Alabama, and grew up in Windham, Ohio, with her brother and parents. She began writing in the fourth grade when her mother gave her a diary for Christmas. Encouraged to write by her parents, in high school Johnson wrote "punk" poetry that was not accepted by her school's literary guild. She says this fueled her writing rather than discouraging it. During high school Johnson wished to be a teacher or lawyer. She attended Kent State University after graduating high school and studied special education, though she left before earning her degree to focus on her writing.

== Career ==
After leaving university, Johnson worked as a nanny and was employed by author Cynthia Rylant who reviewed Johnson's work and forwarded it to her own publisher. Rylant's publisher contacted Johnson saying he'd like to publish the story she'd shared as a picture book. Johnson credits her connection with Rylant as giving her the "break" that launched her career.

Johnson began her career publishing picture books in 1989. In 1993 she branched out into books for young adults, publishing Toning the Sweep. Johnson continues to write across age groups which is rare for authors today. Johnson describes her work as "character driven" and says that she struggles more with the formulation of plot than the development of characters. She says that her characters are sometimes based on people she has met and the stories they have shared with her. According to Johnson, strangers often tell her stories. An older woman on a bus once told her about the man she'd fallen in love with as a teenager. War had kept them apart but they'd stayed in touch and the woman had plans to see him again. This became the inspiration for her characters Sweet and Curtis in Sweet, Hereafter. Johnson also says of her writing "I've never set out to teach a lesson, to lecture anyone. I just want to tell a good story." Jonathan Hunt, chair of the 2018 Margaret A. Edwards Award committee praised Johnson's writing for its timeless, nuanced, and elegant craft as well as its wide appeal. Fellow children's book author Jacqueline Woodson describes Johnson's writing style as realistic, engaging, and accessible. She says "you can tell by reading her work that she takes her time with the narrative and truly cares about the characters."

Rarely attending conferences or making class visits, Johnson avoids the public eye. She does not have a social media presence, although she does have a website. Although she has slowed down, Johnson plans to continue writing.

== Awards ==
Johnson has won awards for both picture books and novels. She won the Ezra Jack Keats New Writer Award for Tell Me a Story, Mama in 1991. She has won the Coretta Scott King Award three times, for Toning the Sweep in 1994, Heaven in 1999, and The First Part Last in 2004. She is also a two-time runner-up for When I Am Old With You in 1990 and The Other Side, Shorter Poems in 1999. She won the Michael L. Printz Award from the American Library Association in 2004, recognizing The First Part Last as the year's "best book written for teens, based entirely on its literary merit". In 2003, Johnson received a MacArthur Fellowship. In 2018, Johnson was awarded the Margaret Edwards Award for her "significant and lasting contribution to young adult literature."

In 2013, the Vermont College of Fine Arts and Barry Goldblatt Literary (an organization that works to foster the careers of children's and young adult authors) announced the creation of a scholarship named after Johnson. The scholarship awards $5000 to up to two students of color attending the MFA in Writing for Children & Young Adults program. Goldblatt chose to name the scholarship in honor of his first client, Angela Johnson.

At Kent State University, Johnson was awarded an honorary doctorate in 2007 and received the Virginia Hamilton Literary Award in 2013.

She received the 2021 Harper Lee Award.

== Selected works ==
Picture books for primary grades (K-2)

- Tell Me a Story, Mama (1989)
- When I am Old With You (1990)
- Do Like Kyla (1990)
- One of Three (1991)
- The Leaving Morning (1992)
- Julius (1993)
- The Girl Who Wore Snakes (1993)
- Mama Bird, Baby Birds (1994)
- Joshua's Night Whispers (1994)
- Rain Feet (1994)
- Joshua By The Sea (1994)
- Shoes Like Miss Alice's (1995)
- The Aunt in Our House (1996)
- The Rolling Store (1997)
- Daddy Calls Me Man (1997)
- The Wedding (1999)
- Down the Winding Road (2000)
- Those Building Men (2001)
- I Dream of Trains (2003)
- Just Like Josh Gibson (2004)
- Violet's Music (2004)
- A Sweet Smell of Roses (2005)
- Lily Brown's Paintings (2007)
- Wind Flyers (2007)

Chapterbooks for intermediate grades (3-5)

- Maniac Monkeys on Magnolia Street (1999)
- When Mules Flew on Magnolia Street (2000)
- Looking For Red (2002)
- Bird (2004)

For older children and young adults

- Toning the Sweep (1993)
- Humming Whispers (1995)
- Songs of Faith (1998)
- Heaven (novel) (1998)
- The Other Side, Shorter Poems (1998)
- Gone From Home: Short Takes (1998)
- Running Back to Ludie (2001)
- The First Part Last (2003)
- Cool Moonlight (2003)

Recent

- Sweet, Hereafter (2010)
- Day Ray Got Away (2010)
- Lotte Paris Lives Here (2011) ISBN 9780689873775
- Certain October (2012)
- Lottie Paris and the Best Place (2013) ISBN 9780689873782
