= Missing Angel Juan =

1995 book by Francesca Lia Block

- First edition
- Author: Francesca Lia Block
- Cover artist: Chris Michaels
- Series: Dangerous Angels
- Publication date: 1995
- Pages: pp. 144
- ISBN: 0-06-447120-9
- Preceded by: Cherokee Bat and the Goat Guys
- Followed by: Baby Be-Bop

Missing Angel Juan is the fourth book in the Dangerous Angels series by Francesca Lia Block. The plot revolves around Witch Baby as she travels to New York City to find her love Angel Juan and bring him back home to Los Angeles. It was adapted for the stage in 1996.

== Plot ==
The story begins with Witch Baby learning that Angel Juan is leaving to go to New York. He wants to go and discover who he is when he is not with Witch Baby. She is left broken-hearted and angry and falls into a depression before deciding to follow Angel Juan to New York.

In New York, Witch Baby stays at the apartment of Weetzie Bat's deceased father, Charlie Bat. He appears to Witch Baby as a ghost and becomes her companion as she searches for Angel Juan. In the end, Witch Baby and Angel Juan are reunited, but Angel Juan tells her he needs to stay in New York a while longer and she has to return to Los Angeles. Witch Baby understands, because even though they cannot be together at present, they love each other and will be together again someday.

== Reception ==
Kirkus Reviews found that "Block's lyrical interplay of leitmotifs and artful allusions ... continues to be uniquely fascinating and provocative." while Publishers Weekly saw that "This odd and moving novel shares the super-hip aesthetic of its predecessors and avoids, as have all of Block's books, rehashing what has come before it." and "Magic and the rich world of fairy tale are, perhaps more than ever, distinct presences."
