= Wasteland (novel) =

Novel by Francesca Lia Block

- First edition cover art
- Author: Francesca Lia Block
- Cover artist: Suza Scalora
- Language: English
- Published: New York: Joanna Cotler Books, 2003
- Publication place: United States
- Pages: 150
- ISBN: 9780060286453

Wasteland is a novel written by Francesca Lia Block and published in 2003.

The plot details teenager Marina's reaction to her brother's suicide. Through flashbacks, it becomes clear that the siblings had developed a physical attraction and were deeply troubled by their feelings for each other. Near the end of the book their mother reveals that one of them was adopted, rendering their relationship star-crossed rather than taboo. It switches narratives and persons throughout the book, alternating between the siblings Marina and Lex, Lex's journal, and Marina's friend West.

The title comes from a poem by T.S. Eliot and references to his works are scattered throughout the novel.

== Critical reviews ==
Critics praised Wasteland for its effective portrayal of a potentially difficult topic, but often found the narrative itself inconsistent. Hazel Rochman of Booklist comments that "A plot surprise at the end seems patched on, and a long quote from T.S. Eliot's "Wasteland" may be beyond many readers. It's Block's simple, beautiful words that reveal the loving connection—and then the fragments." Catherine Ensley writes for School Library Journal, "...chapters switch abruptly...while parental flakes aren't unusual in Block's fiction, readers may have a difficult time buying into the mother's reason for not telling her children about the adoption."
