= Jim Murphy (author) =

American author (1947–2022)

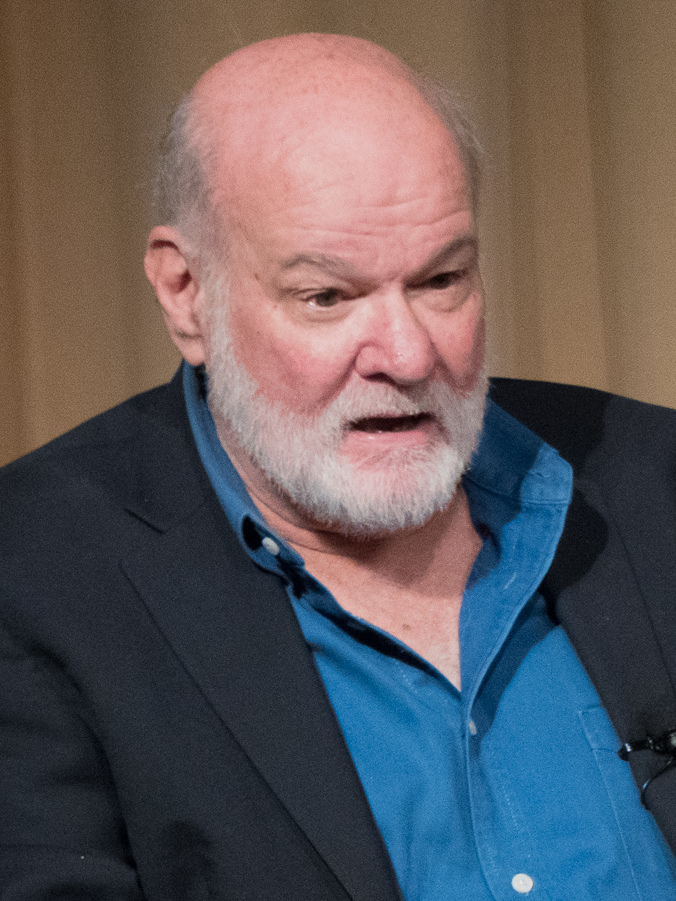
- Murphy in 2018
- Born: James John Patrick Murphy; September 25, 1947; Newark, New Jersey, U.S.
- Died: May 1, 2022 (aged 74); Woodstock, New York, U.S.
- Education: Rutgers University (BA)
- Occupation: Author
- Spouse(s): Elaine Kelso (divorced) Alison Blank (m. 1987)
- Children: 2

James John Patrick Murphy (September 25, 1947 – May 1, 2022) was an American author. He wrote more than 35 nonfiction and fiction books for children, young adults, and general audiences, including more than 30 about American history. He won the Margaret A. Edwards Award from the American Library Association in 2010 for his contribution in writing for teens.

== Early life ==
Murphy was born in Newark, New Jersey, on September 25, 1947. His father, James K. Murphy, was employed as an accountant; his mother, Helen Irene, worked as bookkeeper and artist. Murphy was raised in St. Stephen's parish in nearby Kearny. He studied English literature, history, and art history at Rutgers University, graduating with a Bachelor of Arts in 1970. He also set records while competing in track and field for the Scarlet Knights. Murphy finished the Radcliffe Publishing Course in the summer of 1970.

== Career ==
After graduation, Murphy was employed in construction by his uncle. He then worked as an assistant editorial secretary at Seabury Press (which ultimately became Clarion Books) in New York City. He was eventually promoted to managing editor, before quitting in 1977 to become a full-time writer. He published his first book, Weird & Wacky Inventions, one year later, having initially written a manuscript for a fictional work that went into thousands of pages before discarding it in favor of nonfiction.

Murphy ultimately authored over 35 books for children and youths throughout his career. One of his early works, Tractors (1984), paved the way for his prevailing writing style of employing first-hand accounts and concentrating on the individuals involved in an event, instead of the event itself. This approach was evident in The Boys' War (1990) and Truce (2009), both of which showed the horrors of war using eyewitness reports from letters, journal entries, oral testimonies, and historic images.

== Personal life ==
Murphy's first marriage was to Elaine Kelso. They eventually divorced. He later married Alison Blank in 1987. They met while working for Seabury Press and remained married until his death. Together, they had two children: Michael and Ben. Murphy and Blank were co-authors of Invincible Microbe: Tuberculosis and the Never-Ending Search for a Cure, published by Clarion in 2012.

Murphy died on May 1, 2022, at his home in Woodstock, New York. He was 74; the cause of death was not known.

== Awards ==
The ALA Margaret A. Edwards Award recognizes one writer and a particular body of work for "significant lasting contribution to young-adult literature". Murphy won the annual award in 2010, citing five nonfiction books published from 1992 to 2003: The Long Road to Gettysburg, The Great Fire, A Young Patriot, Blizzard! The Storm That Changed America, and An American Plague: The True and Terrifying Story of the Yellow Fever Epidemic of 1793 (‡). According to the citation, "Murphy's well-researched books bring history alive through multiple narratives involving young people. Primary sources, maps, photos, illustrations and dialogue reveal the drama of historical events, making Murphy's books fast-paced reading of particular interest for young adults. The reader participates in the lives of these individuals and the events that shaped history."

Beside the Edwards Award for lifetime achievement in young-adult literature, the American librarians have named Murphy a runner-up for annual Newbery Medals twice, in 1996 for The Great Fire and in 2004 for An American Plague. The Newbery is the ALA's premier book award for children's literature. Murphy won the ALA award for children's information books, the Robert F. Sibert Medal, for The American Plague in 2004 and he was a runner-up for BLIZZARD! in 2001. The American Plague was also a finalist for the 2003 National Book Award for Young People's Literature.

Murphy also won three NCTE Orbis Pictus Awards, three Jefferson Cup Awards, two SCBWI Golden Kite Awards, The Washington Post/Children's Book Guild Award for Distinguished Nonfiction, and the Boston Globe–Horn Book Award. In 2013 he received the Anne V. Zarrow Award for Young Readers' Literature, presented by the Tulsa Library Trust.

== Selected works ==
=== Nonfiction ===
Key
‡	Denotes five nonfiction book cited by the panel of American librarians who awarded Murphy the 2010 Edwards Award.

- —— (1978). Weird & Wacky Inventions. Crown Publishers. ISBN 9781634502030.
- —— (1990). The Boys' War: Confederate and Union Soldiers Talk About the Civil War. Clarion Books. ISBN 9781439578841.
- —— (1992). The Long Road to Gettysburg. Clarion Books. ISBN 9780395559659.‡
- —— (1993). Across America on an Emigrant Train. Adaptation of Robert Louis Stevenson’s account. Clarion Books. ISBN 9780756991449.
- —— (1995). The Great Fire. Scholastic Corporation. ISBN 9780590472678.‡
- —— (1995). A Young Patriot: The American Revolution as Experienced by One Boy. Adaptation of Joseph Plumb Martin’s account. Clarion Books. ISBN 9780395605233.‡
- —— (1998). Gone A-Whaling: The Lure of the Sea and the Hunt for the Great Whale. Clarion Books. ISBN 9780395698471.
- —— (2000). Blizzard! The Storm That Changed America. Scholastic. ISBN 9780590673099.‡
- —— (2003). An American Plague: The True and Terrifying Story of the Yellow Fever Epidemic of 1793. Clarion Books. ISBN 9780395776087.‡
- —— (2003). Inside the Alamo. Delacorte Books. ISBN 9780385900928.
- —— (2006). Desperate Journey. Scholastic. ISBN 9780439078061.
- —— (2007). The Real Benedict Arnold. Clarion Books. ISBN 9780395776094.
- —— (2009). A Savage Thunder: Antietam and the Bloody Road to Freedom. Margaret K. McElderry Books. ISBN 9780689876332.
- —— (2009). Truce: The Day the Soldiers Stopped Fighting. Scholastic. ISBN 9780545130493.
- —— (2010). The Crossing: How George Washington Saved the American Revolution. Scholastic. ISBN 9780439691864.
- —— (2012). The Giant and How He Humbugged America. Scholastic. ISBN 9780545537759.
- —— (2012). Invincible Microbe: Tuberculosis and the Never-Ending Search for a Cure. Co-written with Alison Blank. Clarion Books. ISBN 9780618535743.

=== Fiction ===
==== Horror ====
- —— (1994). Night Terrors. Scholastic. ISBN 9780590453424.

==== Children's Picture Books ====
- —— (1988). The Last Dinosaur. Illustrated by Mark Alan Weatherby. Scholastic. ISBN 9780590410984.
- —— (1989). The Call of the Wolves. Illustrated by Mark Alan Weatherby. Scholastic. ISBN 9780590419406.

==== Dear America Books ====
- —— (2001). My Face to the Wind: The Diary of Sarah Jane Price, a Prairie Teacher. Scholastic. ISBN 9780590438100.
- —— (1998). The Journal of James Edmond Pease, a Civil War Union Soldier. Scholastic. ISBN 9780590438148.
- —— (1998). West to a Land of Plenty: The Diary of Teresa Angelino Viscardi. Scholastic. ISBN 9780590738880.
- —— (2003). The Journal of Brian Doyle: A Greenhorn on an Alaskan Whaling Ship. Scholastic. ISBN 9780439078146.
