= A Young Patriot =

1996 American Revolutionary War children's book

A Young Patriot: The American Revolution as Experienced by One Boy
- Author: Jim Murphy
- Language: English
- Subject: Children's non-fiction, US history,
- Published: 1996 (Clarion Books)
- Publication place: USA
- Media type: Print (hardback)
- Pages: 101
- ISBN: 978-0-395-60523-3
- OCLC: 29310303

children's history book by Jim Murphy. It is about the American Revolution and is based on the writings of Joseph Plumb Martin.

== Reception ==
The School Library Journal in a review of A Young Patriot, called it "An outstanding example of history brought to life through the experience of one individual" and Booklist wrote "Although source notes would have been a welcome addition, young readers researching the military and social history of the American Revolution will find this an excellent resource." In a star review Kirkus Reviews wrote "This work offers a view of the Revolutionary War missing from most books--instead of the broad sweep of dramatic events and change, readers see the daily misery, boredom, confusion, terror, and only occasional triumph of army life. Murphy provides the best of both, the drama and the grind, appeasing readers' fascination with war without romanticizing it."

The Cooperative Children's Book Center called it a " well-documented, carefully developed narrative".

== Awards and nominations ==
- 2010 Margaret Edwards Award - one of five titles contributing to Murphy receiving the award.
