= Baby Be-Bop =

Young-adult fiction book

- First edition
- Author: Francesca Lia Block
- Language: English
- Series: Weetzie Bat
- Genre: Young adult fiction
- Publisher: HarperCollinsPublishers
- Publication date: September 1995
- Publication place: United States
- ISBN: 0064471764
- Preceded by: Missing Angel Juan

Baby Be-Bop is the fifth book in the Dangerous Angels series by Francesca Lia Block. It was first published during September 1995 through HarperCollins Publishers. Baby Be-Bop takes place prior to the events in Weetzie Bat and follows Weetzie's best friend, Dirk McDonald.

== Plot ==
Even though readers first meet Dirk McDonald in Weetzie Bat, Block explores his past in Baby Be-Bop.

Dirk had a magical childhood while growing up in the care of his Grandma Fifi. Despite enjoying the beach, surfing, and Grandma Fifi's 1955 Pontiac convertible, Dirk was not truly happy because he had a secret. Dirk worried that if he told anyone this secret, he would no longer be accepted or loved.

One night, Dirk's magic lamp comes to life and shows him all the stories from the past. After coming to terms with who he is, Dirk accepts himself and learns that "any love that is love is right."

== Challenged status ==
In 2009 an attempt was made to remove the book from the youth section and library website in West Bend, Wisconsin, by the West Bend Citizens for Safe Libraries. The group asked that the library remove Block's novel, among others, from the library website in addition to relocating them from the youth collection to the adult section. Another group, the West Bend Parents for Free Speech, formed to oppose these changes, and after a public hearing on June 3, the library board voted unanimously to make no changes to where the books were shelved or to the website.

Four men, members of the Christian Civil Liberties Union, filed a lawsuit against the city of West Bend and the West Bend Community Memorial Library where the book was featured in a display, stating that "their mental and emotional well-being was damaged by this book at the library" and that it contained language that would "put one's life in possible jeopardy, adults and children alike". The complaint demanded that Baby Be-Bop be publicly burned, and also asked for US$120,000 in compensatory damages.

== Reception ==
In his review of Block's fifth installment of her Weetzie Bat series, Charles de Lint notes that, "she touches on dark matters...but she does so with warmth, humor, truth, and a whimsical nature that never manages to undermine the more serious concerns from which her stories grow". Further, he claims that while her books may be filed in the YA section, "her stories are timeless and are as suitable for an adult as a teenager". In regard to Baby Be-Bop, de Lint states that the book includes some "wonderfully surreal scenes" that provide a "true no-holds-barred glimpse into both the turmoil of what it's like to be young and different".

Diane Roback and Elizabeth Devereaux, writing in Publishers Weekly, called Baby Be-Bop a "keenly felt story" with "extravagantly imaginative settings and finely honed perspectives".

=== Awards and nominations ===
Awards for Baby Be-Bop
Year	Award	Result	Ref.
1996	Lambda Literary Award for Children's/Young Adult	Finalist	
1996	Stonewall Book Award-Barbara Gittings Literature Award	Finalist	
