= The Boys' War: Confederate and Union Soldiers Talk About the Civil War =

1990 children's book by Jim Murphy

- Author: Jim Murphy
- Language: English
- Subject: Children's non-fiction, US history, American Civil War
- Published: 1990 (Clarion Books)
- Publication place: USA
- Media type: Print (hardback)
- Pages: 110
- ISBN: 9780899198934
- OCLC: 20419540

The Boys' War: Confederate and Union Soldiers Talk About the Civil War is a 1990 Children's history book by Jim Murphy. It describes the experiences of boy soldiers in the American Civil War.

== Reception ==
A review of The Boys' War by Booklist wrote "Except for his overuse of the exclamation point, Murphy's style is nonhistrionic; he allows the drama to come from the boys' words and from the sepia pictures, which evoke the stills in the recent PBS series on the war and are sure to lure browsers of all ages." and School Library Journal called it an "informative, moving work."

Kirkus Reviews found it "Undistinguished writing, but useful." while The Cooperative Children's Book Center called it "an intriguing history of the Civil War".

Publishers Weekly wrote "Handsomely produced, the book does not shrink from presenting the stark images of youngsters killed or mutilated in battle. The extensive use of contemporary archival photos reinforces the power of the understated text."

== Awards and nominations ==
1990 Horn Book Fanfare book
1991 Golden Kite Award for non-fiction - winner
