= Annie on My Mind =

1982 young adult novel by Nancy Garden

- 1992 cover, preferred by the author
- Author: Nancy Garden
- Language: English
- Genre: Young adult; Romance; Lesbian
- Publisher: Farrar, Straus and Giroux
- Publication date: July 1982
- Publication place: United States of America
- Media type: Print (Hardback & Paperback)
- Pages: 233 pages (first edition, hardback)
- ISBN: 0-374-30366-5 (first edition, hardback) & ISBN 0-374-40414-3 (paperback edition)
- OCLC: 8475083
- LC Class: PZ7.G165 An 1982

Annie on My Mind is a 1982 novel by Nancy Garden about the romantic relationship between two 17-year-old New York City girls, Annie and Liza.

== Characters ==
Liza Winthrop: The protagonist and narrator of the novel, Liza is a 17-year-old girl living in the upscale neighborhood of Brooklyn Heights. She, along with her younger brother, Chad, attends Foster Academy, a private school nearby, which is facing financial trouble, and is the student council president there. She is desperate to become an architect at MIT, similar to her father, who is an engineer that studied there.

Annie Kenyon: Annie, also 17, lives "far uptown" in a shabby neighborhood. She lives with her father and grandmother, who were both Italian immigrants, and her American mother. She loves plants, is a brilliant singer, and misses her home from when she was young in San Francisco.

Ms. Isabelle Stevenson: Ms. Stevenson is Liza's art teacher at Foster Academy, who is deeply involved in the school's extracurriculars, and lives with her fellow teacher, Ms. Widmer, who it turns out is her partner.

Ms. Katherine Widmer: Ms. Widmer is Liza's English teacher, inspires and looks after her students, and lives with Ms. Stevenson (who's secretly her partner).

Sally Jarrell: Sally attends Foster Academy, and is a close friend of Liza. She and her boyfriend, Walt, who also attends the school, become the student leaders of the drive to help Foster Academy's financial difficulties.

Mrs. Poindexter: Mrs. Poindexter is the conservative and traditional headmistress of Foster Academy.

== Plot summary ==
Liza Winthrop first meets Annie Kenyon at the Metropolitan Museum of Art on a rainy day. The two quickly become close friends, despite coming from different backgrounds and possessing differing levels of confidence.

Liza is the student body president at her private school, Foster Academy, where she is working hard to get into MIT and become an architect. She lives with her parents and younger brother in the upscale neighborhood of Brooklyn Heights, where most residents are professionals. At school, Liza fails to prevent her friend and classmate, Sally Jarrell, from running an amateur ear-piercing business in the school basement, resulting in both Liza and Sally being reprimanded by the headmistress, Mrs. Poindexter.

Annie attends a public school and lives with her parents—a bookkeeper and a cabdriver—and her grandmother in a lower-income part of Manhattan. Although unsure if she will be accepted, Annie hopes to attend the University of California, Berkeley, to develop her talent as a singer.

Despite their different backgrounds and life goals, the two girls share a close friendship that quickly blossoms into love. Liza's school is struggling to stay open, and she finds herself defending Sally in a school trial in front of the student body. This results in a three-day suspension for Liza and helps bring Liza and Annie closer as they both navigate the challenges many high school students face.

The suspension, coinciding with the Thanksgiving break, gives the girls time to grow even closer, leading to their first kiss. Annie admits that she has wondered if she might be gay. Liza soon realizes that, although she has always felt different, she hadn't considered her sexual orientation until she fell in love with Annie.

During spring break, when two of Liza's female teachers, Ms. Stevenson and Ms. Widmer, who live together, go on vacation, Liza volunteers to take care of their home and feed their cats. The two girls stay at the house together, but in an unexpected turn of events, a Foster Academy administrator discovers Liza and Annie together. Liza is forced to tell her family about her relationship with Annie, and Mrs. Poindexter organizes a meeting of the school's board of trustees to expel Liza. The board rules in favor of Liza staying at Foster, allowing her to keep her position as student president. However, Ms. Stevenson and Ms. Widmer, who are outed as gay during the process due to Sally's false testimony about their influence on Liza, are fired. After their initial shock at discovering the girls together, the teachers are very supportive and go out of their way to reassure Liza not to worry about their dismissal. Nevertheless, the responses from both her family and her fellow students push Liza to break up with Annie.

The girls go their separate ways to colleges on different coasts. In a happy ending, Liza's reevaluation of her relationship while at college and her corresponding acceptance of her sexual orientation allow the two girls to reunite.

The book is framed by Liza's thoughts as she attempts to write Annie a letter in response to the many letters Annie has sent her. This narration occurs just before the winter break at both of their colleges, and Liza finds herself unable to finish or mail the letter she has been working on. Instead, she calls Annie, and the two reconcile, deciding to meet before going home for winter break.

== Publication ==
The novel was originally published in 1982 by Farrar, Straus & Giroux. Since then, it has never been out of print.

Editions of the book include the following:

Year	ISBN	Edition and publisher
2007	ISBN 0-374-40011-3	Farrar, Straus and Giroux (BYR), paperback
1999	ISBN 0-8085-8756-0	Rebound by Sagebrush, school and library binding
1992	ISBN 0-374-40413-5	Farrar Straus & Giroux, paperback
1988	ISBN 0-86068-271-4	Virago Press Ltd, paperback

=== Cover art ===
Changes in cover art throughout the years has reflected the change in attitudes towards gay people, according to the author. The original cover illustration showed Annie, in a black cloak, and Liza, standing away from Annie, on the Esplanade in Brooklyn overlooking the harbor. Garden commented that "it really looks as if Annie is going to swoop down on Liza—almost like a vampire attacking". Although this cover was never used, future covers failed to show the girls relating, Garden said. Garden's preferred cover art, which came out in 1992 and has been reused in more recent publications, shows "the two girls really relating to each other equally," Garden said.

== Reception ==
=== Praise ===
The American Library Association designated the book a "Best of the Best Books for Young Adults". The School Library Journal included the book in its list of the 100 most influential books of the 20th century. It was selected to the 1982 Booklist Reviewer's Choice, the 1982 American Library Association Best Books, and the ALA Best of the Best lists (1970–1983). The Young Adult Library Services Association, a division of the American Library Association, gave Nancy Garden its Margaret A. Edwards Award for Lifetime Achievement for Annie on My Mind in 2003.

=== Criticism ===
The book is #48 on The 100 Most Frequently Challenged Books during the period 1990 to 2000, according to the American Library Association. It ranked No. 44 on the ALA's 1990 to 1999 list.

==== Kansas City controversy ====
In 1993, the LGBTQ organization Project 21 donated Annie on My Mind, along with Frank Mosca's All-American Boys, to 42 high schools in the Kansas City area. Because both books included homosexual themes, some parents objected that the books were made available to high school students.

During the controversy, copies of the book were burned.

Around the time the incident happened, author Nancy Garden was at a writers' conference. When asked if she had had trouble with Annie on My Mind she said no. Soon after, she learned of the burning when she received a call from Stephen Friedman, who asked, "Did you know your book has just been burned in Kansas City?"

Garden commented on the incident,

Burned! I didn't think people burned books any more. Only Nazis burn books.

On December 13, 1993, superintendent Ron Wimmer, of the Olathe (Kansas) School District, ordered the book removed from the high school library. Wimmer said he made his decision in order to "avoid controversy", such as the public book burning.

The Olathe School District refused to accept copies of the book, removing a copy that had sat on its shelf for over ten years. In response, the American Civil Liberties Union joined several families and a teacher and sued the school district for removing the book.

Two years later in September 1995, the case went to trial. In November 1995, US District Court Justice Thomas Van Bebber ruled that while a school district is not obligated to purchase any book, it cannot remove a book from library shelves unless that book is deemed educationally unsuitable. He ruled Annie on My Mind to be educationally suitable, and called its removal an unconstitutional attempt to "prescribe what shall be orthodox in politics, nationalism, religion, or other matters of opinion".

On December 29, 1999, the school district announced it would not appeal the court's decision, and restored Annie on My Mind to library shelves. The entire proceeding had cost the district over $160,000.

After the banning controversy, author Nancy Garden became a spokesperson on behalf of children's intellectual freedom as readers. This earned her the Robert B. Downs Intellectual Freedom Award in 2000.

== Adaptations ==
In 1991, as part of BBC Radio 5's programming for gay teenagers, producer Anne Edyvean directed a dramatization of the novel, written by Sarah Daniels.

In 1994, Kim J. Smith collaborated with Nancy Garden to write a play based on her novel. The play premiered on November 4, 1994, at the Renegade Theatre in Lawrence, Kansas. Fred Phelps and some of his followers picketed the event. The play was the only production of the Renegade Youth Theatre's "Banned Book Theatre".

== See also ==
- Lesbian teen fiction
- LGBT literature
- List of most commonly challenged books in the U.S.
