= Francesca Lia Block =

American writer (born 1963)

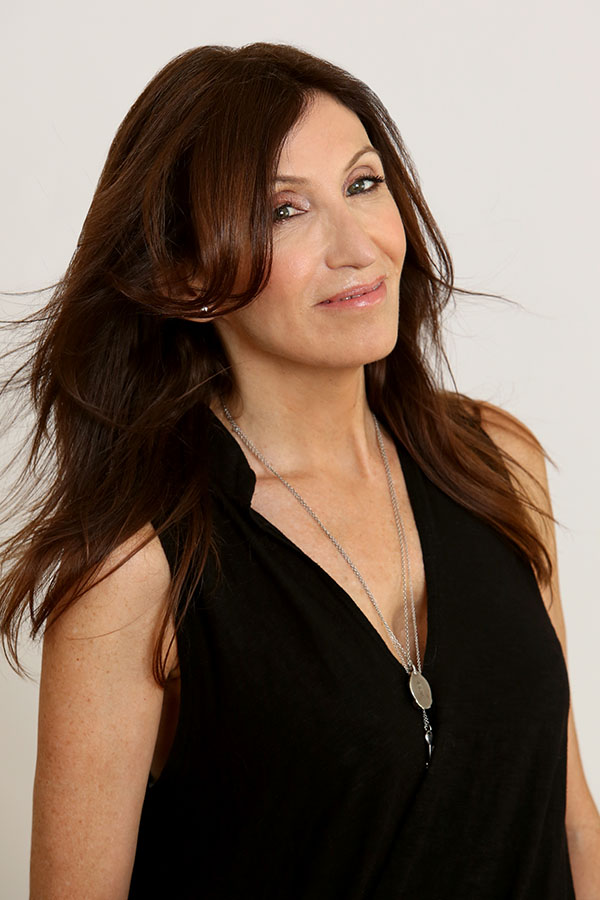
- Born: December 3, 1962 (age 63); Los Angeles, California, US
- Education: University of California, Berkeley
- Occupation: Writer
- Children: 2
- Writing career
- Language: English
- Period: 1989–present
- Notable awards: Margaret Edwards Award; 2005

Francesca Lia Block (born December 3, 1962) is an American writer of adult and young-adult literature. She is best known for writing the Weetzie Bat series, which she began while a student at UC Berkeley.

== Early life and education ==
Block was born in Los Angeles on December 3, 1962. Her mother was the poet Gilda Block (nee Klein) and her father was the screenwriter and painter Irving Block. She attended North Hollywood High School and the University of California, Berkeley, and later studied for her MFA from the University of California at Riverside.

== Career ==
Block writes both novels and poetry. Her first two books, Moon Harvest (1978) and Season of Green (1979), were small-press illustrated poetry collections, now out of print. Since then, she has released several standalone collections of poetry, as well as incorporating poetry and lyrics into many of her novels. She has published over 40 books.

Block did not originally start out with an editor, but was published by using her connections. She attributed her success partly to publishers being interested in shorter books.

In 2014, Block was named Writer-in-Residence at Pasadena City College. Block is a member of the Authors Guild, Authors League of America, and the Writers Guild of America.

In 2018, it was confirmed that Weetzie Bat would be produced as a feature film, with Justin Kelly attached as director. Block wrote the screenplay for the film.

Block is known for her use of imagery, especially in describing the city of Los Angeles. One New York Times Book Review critic said, "Block writes about the real Los Angeles better than anyone since Raymond Chandler."

Block has taught creative writing at the University of Redlands, UCLA Extension, and Antioch University.

== Writing style and genres ==
Block sees her books as being in the tradition of magical realism, and she has said that she was heavily influenced by Gabriel Garcia Marquez and Isabel Allende, as well as Emily Dickinson. She has been compared to S.E. Hinton because of themes like sex, death, drugs, and broken homes that occur in her works. Many of her books have been categorized as young adult fiction, but Block has also written adult fiction, non-fiction, short stories, and poetry.

== Personal life ==
Block has a son and a daughter. She lives in Los Angeles.

== Awards and nominations ==
- 1996: Baby Be-Bop was nominated for the Lambda Literary Award for Young Adult/Children's Book
- 2001: Dangerous Angels was inducted into the Gaylactic Spectrum Awards Hall of Fame
- 2005: American Library Association (ALA) Margaret A. Edwards Award for "significant and lasting contribution to young adult literature" for the first five Weetzie Bat books.
- 2009: Weetzie Bat won the Phoenix Award from the Children's Literature Association as the best English-language children's book that did not win a major award when it was originally published.

== Bibliography ==
Weetzie Bat, or Dangerous Angels series
1. Weetzie Bat (1989) — winner of the 2009 Phoenix Award
2. Witch Baby (1991)
3. Cherokee Bat and the Goat Guys (1992)
4. Missing Angel Juan (1993)
5. Baby Be-Bop (1995)
6. Necklace of Kisses (2005)
7. Pink Smog (2012), prequel
Omnibus editions
- Dangerous Angels: The Weetzie Bat Books, volumes 1–5 (1998)
- Beautiful Boys: Two Weetzie Bat Books, 4–5 (2004)
- Goat Girls: Two Weetzie Bat Books, 2–3 (2004)

Standalone novels

- Ecstasia (1993)
- The Hanged Man (1994)
- Primavera (1994)
- I Was A Teenage Fairy (1998)
- Violet and Claire (1999)
- The Rose and the Beast (2000)
- Echo (2001)
- Wasteland (2003)
- Ruby (2006)
- Psyche In A Dress (2006)
- Blood Roses (2008)
- Quakeland (2008)
- The Waters and the Wild (2009)
- Pretty Dead (2009)
- The Frenzy (2010)
- House of Dolls (2010)
- The Elementals (St. Martin's Press, 2013)
- Love in the Time of Global Warming (2013)
- Teen Spirit (2014)
- The Island of Excess Love (2014)
- Beyond the Pale Motel (2014)
- My Miserable Life (2016), as F.L. Block
- Lost Children (2021), audiobook

House Of Hearts (Rare Bird Books, 2022)

Collections
- Moon Harvest: Poems (1978), poetry
- Season of Green: Poems (1979), poetry
- Girl Goddess #9: Nine Stories (1996), short stories
- Nymph: Nine Erotic Stories (2003), short stories
- Blood Roses (2008), short stories
- How to (Un)cage a Girl (2008), poetry
- Open Letter to Quiet Light (2009), poetry
- Roses & Bones (2010), omnibus of Psyche in a Dress, Echo, and The Rose and the Beast
- Fairy Tales in Electri-City (2011), poetry
- Love Magick (2012), editor
- Dead Girls (2019), poetry
Non-fiction and other
- Zine Scene: the do it yourself guide to zines (1998)
- Guarding the Moon: A Mother's First Year (2003)
- Wood Nymph Seeks Centaur: A Mythological Dating Guide (2009)
- Evidence of Angels (2009), with photographer Suza Scalora
- The Thorn Necklace: Healing Through Writing and the Creative process (2018)
