= Alanna: The First Adventure =

1983 novel by Tamora Pierce

- Original Atheneum U.S. hardcover of the book featuring the title character.
- Author: Tamora Pierce
- Cover artist: David Wiesner
- Language: English
- Series: The Song of the Lioness
- Genre: Fantasy
- Publisher: Atheneum
- Publication date: September 1983
- Publication place: United States
- Media type: Print (hardback & paperback)
- Pages: 231 pp
- ISBN: 0-689-30994-5
- OCLC: 9219289
- LC Class: PZ7.P61464 Al 1983
- Followed by: In the Hand of the Goddess

Alanna: The First Adventure is a fantasy novel by Tamora Pierce. Originally published in 1983, it is the first in a series of four books for young adults, The Song of the Lioness. Pierce originally drafted a single novel aimed at adults, but revised it to a series for young adults after being unable to find a publisher. Set in a time and place where girls are forbidden from becoming knights, the novel details the beginning of Alanna of Trebond's training as a knight as she hides her gender from teachers and fellow pages.

In 2013, Pierce received the Margaret A. Edwards Award from the American Library Association in recognition of her two quartets, Song of the Lioness and Protector of the Small. Edwards Committee Chair Jamie Watson commented that the books in both these quartets "have been influencing both readers and writers of fantasy since their inception".

In 2020, it was included on Time’s list of the top 100 best fantasy books of all time.

== Publishing background ==
Originally, Tamora Pierce penned Alanna's tale as a single, adult-oriented novel spanning 732 pages, titled "The Song of the Lioness." As she wrote the original manuscript in the era before computers, even Pierce herself no longer possesses it. She initially submitted this work to publishers in the late 1970s, but was unable to secure a deal. Following the advice of a friend who later became her first agent, Pierce revisited the manuscript and transformed it into a four-book series aimed at young adults. She dedicated much of the 1980s to this rewriting process. The first installment, "Alanna: The First Adventure," was eventually published in 1983 by Atheneum.

== Plot introduction ==
The book, set in the fantasy kingdom of Tortall, follows Alanna's growth as a page in the royal court, where she keeps her gender a secret, while learning to fence, fight, ride, and study alongside the male pages. Alanna befriends the heir to the throne and the charming King of Thieves, copes with the magical power she possesses and her mistrust of it, faces the palace bully, struggles with her suspicions of the prince's cousin Duke Roger, and finally travels to the southern desert, where the Bazhir tribesmen guard a Black City that has invaded her dreams. There, she and her friend Prince Jonathan defeat the much-feared Ysandir, a race of demons that has kept the Black City captive for generations. In the process, Jonathan learns that Alanna is a girl. Despite this, he chooses her as his squire when he becomes a knight.

== Plot summary ==
Alanna of Trebond and her twin brother Thom may be twins, but are very different; Alanna is a tomboy who dreams of being a knight, and Thom wishes to become a sorcerer. Unfortunately, Alanna is shortly to be dispatched by their inattentive father to a temple in the City of the Gods, to learn to become a young lady—to her, a fate worse than death—whilst Thom is similarly destined for the royal palace, where he will train as a knight: his worst nightmare, as he believes that his destiny is to be a sorcerer.

To avoid their respective fates, Alanna and Thom hatch a plan; Alanna will disguise herself as a boy, call herself Alan, and take Thom's place as a knight. Thom will go to the City of the Gods, where he will be able to train as a sorcerer. After convincing their two caregivers, the healing woman Maude and the soldier Coram, that their plan will succeed, they set off.

At the palace, "Alan" trains as a page, meeting many friends, such as Raoul of Goldenlake, Gareth the Younger of Naxen, Francis of Nond, Alexander of Tirragen, and Prince Jonathan of Conté. She also makes an enemy during her first day in the palace: Ralon of Malven, who continuously bullies her. Rather than have her companions beat him, Alanna secretly trains with George Cooper, the King of the Court of the Rogue (i.e. King of the Thieves), a friendly thief and master of the capital city’s criminal underworld, until she can beat Ralon of Malven herself. When she does, he leaves Court, vowing revenge.

During Alanna's page years, a fever, the Sweating Sickness, spreads within the capital city, Corus, and nowhere else. This disease is different than all other known diseases in that it drains healers of their powers to heal, and even kills them. There is talk that it was sent by a great sorcerer. Alanna has a powerful healing Gift, but is frightened to use it, so she doesn't tell anyone that she can heal. Due to this refusal of her abilities, Francis of Nond, one of her friends, dies.

When Prince Jonathan falls ill, Alanna, recognizing herself as the only undrained healer in the city, tries to heal him. She succeeds, but only through evoking the Great Mother Goddess and fetching Jonathan from the place in between Life and Death. In doing so, she unknowingly reveals herself as a female to Sir Myles of Olau, one of her mentors. Shortly after, Jonathan's powerful sorcerer cousin, Duke Roger of Conté, comes to live at the palace and teach the Gifted pages and squires magic.

Alanna goes to George Cooper's mother, a healer, after she has her first monthly period. She tells George the truth about her gender. Jonathan also discovers the truth during Alanna's last year as a page, when she comes on a trip for the squires on the behest of Prince Jonathan to Persopolis, the only city of the Bazhir, a race of nomadic desert people.

All the squires were warned to stay away from the Black City, a city just within view of Persopolis, by Duke Roger. However, Jonathan decides to ride for the city to defeat whatever evil lies there, and Alanna goes with him to help him in his quest. The two arrive at the city to find it completely deserted; that is, until they enter the large, central temple. There they find the Ysandir, beings who will not age or starve as mortals will, but that can be killed. Jonathan and Alanna begin to fight, but things began to go awry when one of the Ysandir magically removes Alanna's clothes to reveal her true sex. Jonathan saves his shock for later, as Alanna and Jonathan must combine their powers to defeat the Ysandir. With the help of her magical sword, given to her earlier by Sir Myles, Alanna defeats the last of the Ysandir, and Jonathan and Alanna head back to Persopolis.

The book ends at an oasis near Persopolis, where Alanna suggested that perhaps Roger had wanted Jonathan to go to the city. Jonathan said that yes, he had, but only so that Jonathan could rid Tortall of a great evil. When Alanna pointed out that perhaps Roger had not expected him to come back alive, Jonathan refused to listen. After this, Jonathan chooses Alanna to be his squire when he is knighted that year. He says he does not care that she is a girl, because she is the best page regardless.

== Characters ==
- Alanna of Trebond – The main protagonist of the series, who hides her real sex to be able to train as a knight.
- Thom of Trebond – Alanna's twin brother, who detests fighting and prefers magic; he goes to the City of the Gods to learn how to be a powerful mage.
- George Cooper, King of Thieves – The King of the Court of the Rogue who is friend to both Alanna and her friends. He is the first to find out about her secret.
- Coram Smythesson – Alanna's first teacher of fighting and hunting at Trebond, he accompanies her to the capital as her manservant; one of the few who knows her true gender.
- Jonathan of Conté – The heir to the throne of Tortall and the King and Queen's only son, Alanna's best friend at the palace; a few years older than Alanna.
- Gareth the Younger of Naxen (a.k.a. "Gary") – One of Jonathan's and Alanna's friends and Jonathan's cousin. Easygoing and funny, with a sharp tongue and sharper mind, he acts as her sponsor when she arrives.
- Duke Gareth of Naxen – The man who oversees the training of the pages and squires, he is Gary's father.
- Roger of Conté – Jonathan's adult cousin, a powerful magician and second in line for the throne; Alanna mistrusts him but has no evidence to support her suspicions, Jonathan trusts him completely.
- Ralon of Malven – One of the pages who bullies Alanna when she arrives; she eventually beats him in a fight and he leaves the palace in furious disgrace.
- Moonlight – Alanna's horse, trained for combat; George bought the horse and sold her to Alanna at a low price.
- Sir Myles of Olau - A Knight, scholar, and the Baron of Olau. Myles was Alanna's friend and mentor as well as the teacher of History and Laws of the Realm to the pages.
