= Across America on an Emigrant Train =

1993 book by Jim Murphy

- Author: Jim Murphy
- Language: English
- Subject: Children's non-fiction, US history,
- Published: 1993 (Clarion Books)
- Publication place: USA
- Media type: Print (hardback)
- Pages: 150
- ISBN: 9780395633908
- OCLC: 27066884

Across America on an Emigrant Train is a 1993 children's history book by Jim Murphy. It is based on Robert Louis Stevenson's 1879 journey from New York City to California.

== Reception ==
Booklist, in a review of Across America, wrote "Murphy's style is plain" and concluded "The experience of ordinary people revitalizes the myths of the West." School Library Journal wrote "Murphy has drawn from the writer's (Stevenson) journal to provide a fresh, primary-source account of transcontinental train travel at that time." and "has woven meticulously researched, absorbing accounts of the building of the railroad and its effect on the territory it crossed .. it is a readable and valuable contribution to literature concerning expansion into the American West" Kirkus Reviews called it "A fascinating, imaginatively structured account that brings the experience vividly to life in all its detail: history at its best."

The Cooperative Children's Book Center found it a "fascinating documentary of westward expansion". and Horn Book Guide a "vivid account" and an "inviting volume".

== Awards and nominations ==
1994 Jefferson Cup Award - winner
1994 Orbis Pictus Award - winner
