= Melissa Sweet (illustrator) =

American author and illustrator (born 1956)

- Born: January 1, 1956 (age 70); Wyckoff, New Jersey, U.S.
- Occupations: Author and illustrator
- Website: melissasweet.net

Melissa Sweet (born January 1, 1956) is an American illustrator and writer of nearly 100 books for children and young readers.

Sweet has won and been a finalist for numerous awards as both a writer and illustrator. In 2012, Balloons Over Broadway won the Golden Kite Award, Orbis Pictus Award, and Sibert Medal. Some Writer won a Cybils Award (2016), New England Book Award for Children's Books, and Orbis Pictus Award. A River of Words (2009) and The Right Word (2015), both written by Jen Bryant, were Caldecott Medal Honor books.

== Personal life ==
Sweet was born in Wyckoff, New Jersey and studied at Kansas City Art Institute.

She lives with her husband in Rockport, Maine.

== Career ==
Sweet began her career in book illustration with James Howe’s Pinky and Rex series. She has since illustrated nearly 100 books; several of these she authored, and for many more she collaborated with other writers. She illustrated three books for author Jen Bryant, including "A River of Words," "A Splash of Red," and "The Right Word."

Sweet conducts extensive research on the subjects of her biographies for children, which she illustrates with watercolor, mixed media, and collage. In her books she said in an interview that she "likes to use every color on the color wheel..." and also that she's "...very big on complementary colors.". In the same interview she says that she took a color theory class, and she did not know how to mix colors, and as a result, used colors "...straight from the tube..." and in response, she said her teacher "...threw out 90 percent of my art supplies. He gave me this limited palette and showed me how to mix colors". Later in this same interview she revealed that watercolor is her favorite medium to illustrate with. She also said in this same interview that she was inspired to start writing and illustrating children's book by Maurice Sendak's Little Bear series, which she said gave her the confidence to believe that she could illustrate children's books.

In Balloons over Broadway, Sweet describes her work process as "To create the art for the book, I began by making toys and puppets. I played with all sorts of materials, not knowing exactly what the outcomes would be.In addition to the watercolor illustrations, my collages are, in part, a mix of paper from old books to make paper-mâché puppets, found objects, and fabrics, all painted or altered to illustrate what it may have felt like to be in Sarg's world. Some of the toys in my illustrations are based on ones from Tony's vast collection, but the actual toys in this book are the ones I made. On a few of the pages I even used Tony's illustrations from The Tony Sarg Marionette Book. I tried to keep in mind that in everything Sarg did, he conveyed the sense that he was having fun His legacy reminds me that “play” may be the most important element in making art!"

Some Writer! The Story of E. B. White is a 176-page long biographical picture book that Sweet wrote and illustrated using watercolor and collage art. It includes excerpts from White's personal life, early drafts of his novels, family pictures, and other previously unpublished information on the writer. She received permission to use White's words from his granddaughter, the chief executor of his will, Martha White. Martha White not only gave Sweet her permission, she offered to help by allowing her to have access to the family's personal records, memorabilia, and photo albums of E. B. White.

== Awards and honors ==
In 2019, the Eric Carle Museum of Picture Book Art awarded Sweet their Carle Honor, which recognizes artists' "contributions to the world of children's literature."

Two of Sweet's books are Junior Library Guild selections: Balloons over Broadway (2011) and Some Writer! (2016).

In 2005, The New York Times named Carmine one of the best illustrated book of the year.

In 2011, Balloons Over Broadway was named one of the best nonfiction children's books of the year by the Chicago Public Library, The Horn Book Magazine, and Publishers Weekly.

Some Writer! is a New York Times Best Seller. It was included on lists of the best books of 2016 by the Chicago Public Library, The Horn Book Magazine, Kirkus Reviews, the Los Angeles Public Library, the New York Public Library, Publishers Weekly, School Library Journal, Shelf Awareness, and The Washington Post.

Awards for Sweet's books
Year	Title	Award	Result	Ref.
2012	Balloons Over Broadway	ALSC Notable Children's Books	Selection	
2012	Balloons Over Broadway	Charlotte Zolotow Award	Commend	
2012	Balloons Over Broadway	Cybils Award for Nonfiction Picture Book	Finalist	
2012	Balloons Over Broadway	Golden Kite Award for Picture Book Illustration	Winner	
2012	Balloons Over Broadway	Orbis Pictus Award	Winner	
2012	Balloons Over Broadway	Robert F. Sibert Informational Book Award	Winner	
2016	Some Writer!	Cybils Award for Juvenile Nonfiction	Winner	
2017	Some Writer!	Boston Globe–Horn Book Award for Nonfiction	Honor	
2017	Some Writer!	New England Book Award for Children's	Winner	
2017	Some Writer!	Orbis Pictus Award	Winner	
2017	Some Writer!	ALSC Notable Children's Books	Selection	

=== As illustrator ===
Fourteen books Sweet has illustrated are Junior Library Guild selections: Pinky and Rex and the School Play (1998), Pinky and Rex and the Perfect Pumpkin (1998), Leaving Vietnam (1999), The Boy Who Drew Birds (2004), A River of Words (2008), Rubia and the Three Osos (2011), Mrs. Harkness and the Panda (2012), Spike, the Mixed-up Monster (2013), Brave Girl (2013), Firefly July (2014), The Right Word (2014), Baabwaa and Wooliam (2017), Alphamaniacs (2020), and Unbound (2021)

In 2009, The Horn Book Magazine named The Sleepy Little Alphabet one of the best picture books of the year.

The same year, The New York Times included A River of Words one of the top ten illustrated books of the year. School Library Journal included in on their list of the year's best nonfiction books.

In 2013, School Library Journal named Brave Girl one of the best nonfiction children's books of the year.

The same year, Little Red Writing was named one of the best books of the year by School Library Journal andKirkus Reviews.

In 2014, Firefly July was named one of the best picture books of the year by The Bulletin of the Center for Children's Books, Publishers Weekly and School Library Journal. The Horn Book Magazine included it on their list of the best poetry of the year.

The same year, The Horn Book Magazine and School Library Journal named The Right Word one of the best nonfiction children's books of the year. Kirkus Reviews, The New York Times, and Publishers Weekly named it one of the best picture books of the year.

In 2017, Publishers Weekly named Baabwaa and Wooliam one of the best picture books of the year.

In 2019, The Bulletin of the Center for Children's Books Included How to Read a Book in their list of the best children's poetry books of the year.

In 2020, The Bulletin of the Center for Children's Books included Alphamaniacs in their list of the best children's poetry books of the year.

Awards for Sweet's books
Year	Title	Award	Result	Ref.
2005	Baby Bear's Chairs	Golden Kite Award for Picture Book Illustration	Winner	
2008	A River of Words	Cybils Award for Nonfiction	Finalist	
2009	A River of Words	Caldecott Medal	Honor	
2009	A River of Words	NCTE Notable Children's Books in the Language Arts for Information/Biography	Selection	
2009	A River of Words	Robert F. Sibert Informational Book Award	Honor	
2011	Rubia and the Three Osos	ALSC Notable Children's Books	Selection	
2012	Mrs Harkness and the Panda	Cybils Award for Nonfiction Picture Book	Winner	
2013	Spike, the Mixed-up Monster	Charlotte Zolotow Award	Commend	
2014	Brave Girl	Orbis Pictus Award	Honor	
2014	Brave Girl	Amelia Bloomer Book List	Top 10	
2014	Firefly July	Goodreads Choice Award for Picture Books	Nominee	
2014	Firefly July	New England Book Award for Children's	Winner	
2014	Firefly July	Cybils Award for Poetry	Finalist	
2014	A Splash of Red	Schneider Family Book Award for Young Children	Winner	
2014	The Right Word	Kirkus Prize for Picture Books	Finalist	
2014	A Splash of Red	Orbis Pictus Award	Winner	
2014	A Splash of Red	Robert F. Sibert Informational Book Award	Honor	
2014	A Splash of Red	ALSC Notable Children's Books	Selection	
2015	Firefly July	ALSC Notable Children's Books	Selection	
2015	The Right Word	Caldecott Medal	Honor	
2015	The Right Word	Golden Kite Award for Picture Book Illustration	Winner	
2015	The Right Word	Orbis Pictus Award	Honor	
2015	The Right Word	Robert F. Sibert Informational Book Award	Winner	
2017	Baabwaa and Wooliam	Cybils Award for Picture Books	Finalist	
2020	How to Read a Book	ALSC Notable Children's Books	Selection	
2022	Unbound	Orbis Pictus Award	Honor	

== Selected works ==
=== Author and illustrator ===
- Carmine: A Little More Red (2005)
- Tupelo Rides the Rails (2008)
- Balloons Over Broadway: The True Story of the Puppeteer of Macy's Parade (2011)
- Some Writer! The Story of E. B. White (2016)

=== Illustrator ===
- Girls Think of Everything: Stories of Ingenious Inventions by Women (2002) by Catherine Thimmish
- Moonlight The Halloween Cat (2003) by Cynthia Rylant
- The Boy Who Drew Birds:The Story of John James Audubon (2004) by Jacqueline Davies
- Baby Bear's Chairs (2005) by Jane Yolen
- A River of Words: The Story of William Carlos Williams (2008) by Jen Bryant
- The Sleepy Little Alphabet: A Bedtime Story from Alphabet Town (2009) by Judy Sierra
- Rubia and the Three Osos (2010) by Susan Middleton Elya
- Mrs. Harkness and the Panda (2012) by Alicia Potter
- Spike, the Mixed Up Monster (2012) by Susan Hood
- A Splash of Red: The Life and Art of Horace Pippin (2013) by Jen Bryant
- The Right Word: Roget and His Thesaurus (2014) by Jen Bryant
- Little Red Writing (2013) by Joan Hoab
- Brave Girl: Clara and the Shirtwaist Maker's Strike (2013) by Michelle Markel
- Day is Done (2014) by Peter Yarrow
- Firefly July: A Year of Very Short Poems (2014) by Paul B. Janeczko
- You Nest Here With Me (2015) by Jane Yolen and Heidi Stemple
- Listen to Our World (2016) by Bill Martin Jr. and Michael Sampson
- How To Read A Book (2019) by Kwame Alexander
- Unbound: The Life and Art of Judith Scott (2021) by Joyce Scott and Brie Spangler
