= The Crossing (Murphy book) =

2010 Children's history book by Jim Murphy

The Crossing: How George Washington Saved the American Revolution
- Author: Jim Murphy
- Language: English
- Subject: Children's non-fiction, US history, American Civil War
- Published: 2010 (Scholastic Press)
- Publication place: USA
- Media type: Print (hardback)
- Pages: 96
- ISBN: 9780439691864
- OCLC: 317383450

The Crossing: How George Washington Saved the American Revolution is a 2010 Children's history book by Jim Murphy. It describes the first couple of years of the American Revolutionary War concentrating on George Washington and his pivotal role in the conflict.

== Reception ==
A starred review of The Crossing by Booklist found "Murphy offers a refreshingly frank, vivid, well-researched account of a pivotal time in American history." and Library Media Connection wrote "This latest work is complete with rich detail and honest appraisal of the main characters. .. Murphy has written an excellent companion to any study of the American Revolution." School Library Journal called it "A first purchase, even if your American Revolution shelves are packed."

The Washington Post wrote "As in Murphy's previous books about war, the roles of luck, weather and leadership are well conveyed, along with the dramatic particulars of pivotal battles." and the New York Journal of Books stated "Overall, a great historical read of one of our nations great men."

It has also been reviewed by Kirkus Reviews and Publishers Weekly.

== See also ==
- George Washington in the American Revolution
- Washington Crossing the Delaware
