= The Call of the Wolves =

1989 picture book by Jim Murphy

- Author: Jim Murphy
- Illustrator: Mark Alan Weatherby
- Language: English
- Genre: Children's picture book
- Published: 1989 (Scholastic)
- Publication place: USA
- Media type: Print (hardback)
- Pages: 32 (unpaginated)
- ISBN: 9780590419413
- OCLC: 18832766

The Call of the Wolves is a 1989 children's picture book by Jim Murphy and illustrated by Mark Weatherby. It is about a young wolf that is separated from his pack during a caribou hunt but is eventually reunited.

== Reception ==
In its review of The Call of the Wolves, Booklist wrote "The taut story line, compelling illustrations, and recently renewed interest in wolves make this fictionalized account valuable." and the School Library Journal wrote "The exquisite ice-blue pages portray the majestic arctic wilderness in a wintry, snowy, half-light. Weatherby's animals spring to life, and he adeptly captures the movement, the stillness, the danger, and the calm of the text. Like Yoshida's Young Lions (Philomel, 1989), this should help generate appreciation for animals in the wild, and is also concerned with issues of separation and connection." Kirkus Reviews calls it "a realistic story".

== Awards and nominations ==
1992 Nevada Young Readers' Award - winner
