= Nancy Garden =

American fiction writer (1938–2014)

- Born: May 15, 1938; Boston, Massachusetts, U.S.
- Died: June 23, 2014 (aged 76); Carlisle, Massachusetts
- Occupation: Writer
- Partner: Sandy Scott (45 years)
- Writing career
- Period: 1971–2012
- Genres: Young-adult and children's novels; supernatural fiction
- Notable work: Annie on My Mind
- Notable awards: Margaret Edwards Award; 2003
- Literary movement: LGBT literature

Nancy Garden (May 15, 1938 – June 23, 2014) was an American writer of fiction for children and young adults, best known for the lesbian novel Annie on My Mind. She received the 2003 Margaret A. Edwards Award from the American Library Association recognizing her lifetime contribution in writing for teens (citing Annie on My Mind).

Annie On My Mind was awarded the Lee Lynch Classic Award by the Golden Crown Literary Society in 2014, cited as one of the most important classics in lesbian literature.

== Early life and education ==
Garden was born in 1938 in Boston. She was an only child.

She earned a B.F.A. (1961) and an M.A. (1962) from Columbia University School of Dramatic Arts. Through school and for several years afterwards, Garden worked in theater, supplementing the work with odd jobs in offices, including freelance editorial work for various publishers.

== Career ==
Garden began her writing career as an assistant editor for Scholastic Magazine in New York City. By 1970, Garden had risen to associate editor. She moved on to be an editor at Houghton Mifflin Co. in Boston between 1971 and 1976. She later visited and gave talks at schools and libraries, teaching children about writing. She has written non-fiction, mystery, and fantasy for children and young adults.

Garden is best known for Annie on My Mind, published by Farrar, Straus and Giroux in 1982. It was critically acclaimed but attracted controversy because of its lesbian love story. It was one of the first teen novels to feature lesbian characters with a happy ending. "I wrote it to give solace to young gay people, to let them know they were not alone, that they could be happy and well adjusted and also to let heterosexual kids know that we gay people aren't monsters," Garden told Booklist in a 1996 interview.

In 1993, Annie on My Mind was banned by the Kansas City school system and burnt in demonstrations. It was returned to shelves after a First Amendment lawsuit by students in 1995. It is #44 on the American Library Association list of 100 books most frequently challenged during the 1990s.

Garden received the Robert B. Downs Award for Intellectual Freedom in 2000 from the University of Illinois Graduate School of Library and Information Science.

Garden won the ALA's Margaret A. Edwards Award in 2003. The panel cited Annie on My Mind and called her "the first author for young adults to create a lesbian love story with a positive ending."

Garden's reviews of young adult titles have appeared in the Lambda Literary Foundation's Lambda Book Report.

== Personal life and death ==
She spent many years living between Massachusetts and Maine, with her partner Sandy Scott.

Nancy Garden died of a heart attack on June 23, 2014, aged 76.

== Works ==
=== Nonfiction ===
- Berlin: City Split in Two (Putnam's, 1971)
- Fun with Weather Forecasting, illus. Dorothea Sierra (Houghton Mifflin, 1973)
- The Kids' Code and Cipher Book (1988)
- Weird and Horrible series
  - Vampires (1973)
  - Werewolves (1973)
  - Witches (1975)
  - Devils and Demons (1976)

=== Fiction ===
- What Happened in Marston (1971)
- The Loners (1972)
- Mist Maiden (1975)
- Annie on My Mind (1982)
- Maria's Mountain (1983)
- Prisoner of Vampires (1984)
- Peace, O River (1986)
- Lark in the Morning (1991)
- My Sister, the Vampire (1992)
- Dove and Sword: A Novel of Joan of Arc (1995)
- My Brother, the Werewolf (1995)
- Good Moon Rising (1996)
- The Year They Burned the Books (1999)
- Holly's Secret (2000)
- Prisoners of Vampires (2001)
- Nora and Liz (2002)
- Meeting Melanie (2002)
- Molly's Family (2004)
- Endgame (2006)
- Hear Us Out! (2007)
- Fours Crossing series
  - Fours Crossing (1981)
  - Watersmeet (1983)
  - The Door Between (1987)
- Monster Hunters
1. Mystery of the Night Raiders (1987)
2. Mystery of the Midnight Menace (1988)
3. Mystery of the Secret Marks (1989)
4. Mystery of the Kidnapped Kidnapper (1994)
5. Mystery of the Watchful Witches (1995)
- Candlestone Inn
1. The Case of the Stolen Scarab (2004)
2. The Case of the Vanishing Valuables (2010)
