= The Long Road to Gettysburg =

1992 children's book by Jim Murphy

- Author: Jim Murphy
- Language: English
- Subject: Children's non-fiction, US history,
- Published: 1992 (Clarion Books)
- Publication place: USA
- Media type: Print (hardback)
- Pages: 116
- ISBN: 9780395559659
- OCLC: 22709275

The Long Road to Gettysburg is a 1992 children's history book by Jim Murphy. It tells the Battle of Gettysburg through the eyes of a Union and a Confederate soldier.

== Reception ==
Booklist, in a review of The Long Road to Gettysburg, called it an "intriguing book" and concluded "An important addition to the Civil War shelf." Reviewing an audio version of the book, the School Library Journal wrote "Overall, this is a worthwhile addition to non-fiction audiobook collections." and Publishers Weekly wrote "Expertly blending details about the battle and each side's plans with the diaries, Murphy conveys all of the tension, tedium and excitement of the battlefield."

The Civil War Book Review wrote "The Long Road to Gettysburg offers middle school readers a sophisticated account of how that climactic battle was experienced by two teenage soldiers who fought on opposing sides."

== Awards and nominations ==
1993 Golden Kite Award for non-fiction - winner
2010 Margaret Edwards Award - one of five titles contributing to Murphy receiving the award.
