= Blizzard! The Storm That Changed America =

Book by Jim Murphy

- Author: Jim Murphy
- Cover artist: Leonid Gore
- Language: English
- Subject: Children's non-fiction, US history,
- Published: 2000 (Scholastic)
- Publication place: USA
- Media type: Print (hardback)
- Pages: 136
- ISBN: 9780590673099
- OCLC: 41108574

Blizzard! The Storm That Changed America is a 2000 Children's history book by Jim Murphy. It is about the Blizzard of 1888 that hit the north-east of North America, and concentrates on New York City.

== Reception ==
Booklist called Blizzard "an example of stellar nonfiction." and the School Library Journal wrote "The narrative is a readable and seamless blend of history and adventure adapted from extensive first-person accounts and primary news sources. .. The text is exciting without being melodramatic .. Authentic photographs, drawings, and maps that demonstrate the course of the storm, all done in the same sepia tone as the text, perfectly illustrate the book. Overall, a superb piece of writing and history." In a star review Kirkus Reviews wrote "Murphy’s ability to pull in details that lend context allows him to tell this story of a place in time through the lens of a single, dramatic episode that will engage readers. This is skillfully done: humorous, jaw-dropping, thought-provoking, and chilling." In a review of an audio version of the book Publishers Weekly wrote "Murphy's well-rounded information about the various circumstances that worsened the effects of the storm make the tale both more fascinating and more tragic. Mali's (Taylor Mali, the reader) steady delivery is very well suited to the material; it allows listeners time to absorb this gripping history lesson."

The Horn Book Magazine stated "Murphy treats his subject with respect as he curbs the inherent sensationalism of the topic through an informal, journalistic style. To build urgency in the narrative, he creates cogent transitions from one event to another and from personal events to broader historical segments. Even with all of these connections, individual chapters stand alone, providing access for browsers and those searching for nonfiction read-alouds. Sepia-colored illustrations (archival photographs and original art from the period) reinforce the historical setting .." and Voice of Youth Advocates wrote "this first annual Sibert Award honor book will appeal to both teens and adults interested in weather extremes and history."

In a review for The New York Times, Mary Russell wrote "Murphy's gift for dealing with disasters .. is that he manages to make them, simultaneously, both larger than we'd thought and smaller, more human than we'd imagined."

== Awards and nominations ==
2001 Jefferson Cup Award - winner
2001 Notable Social Studies Trade Book for Young People
2001 Robert F. Sibert Medal - honor
2010 Margaret Edwards Award - one of five titles contributing to Murphy receiving the award.
