= The Song of the Lioness =

Fantasy novel series for young adults

- Original Atheneum U.S. hardcover of the first book.
- Alanna: The First Adventure; In the Hand of the Goddess; The Woman Who Rides Like a Man; Lioness Rampant
- Author: Tamora Pierce
- Country: United States
- Language: English
- Genre: Fantasy, young adult fiction
- Publisher: Atheneum Books
- Published: 1983–1988
- Media type: Print (hardback and paperback); Audiobook
- Followed by: The Immortals

The Song of the Lioness is a young adult series of fantasy novels published in the 1980s by Tamora Pierce. The series consists of four books: Alanna: The First Adventure (1983), In the Hand of the Goddess (1984), The Woman Who Rides Like a Man (1986) and Lioness Rampant (1988).

== Plot summary ==
Noblewoman Alanna of Trebond, disguised as the boy "Alan", exchanges places with her twin brother Thom, to go to the royal palace in the city of Corus to train for knighthood, while Thom studies magic. Throughout the four novels Alanna deals with her secretive and unusual status as an aspiring female knight; friendships; romances; physical hardship; world-changing quests and duty. She experiences such challenges as puberty, bullying and defying social convention. Alanna befriends characters of a wide background during the quartet including George, the commoner king of the thieves; the scholar Sir Myles of Olau; senior students Gareth (Gary) of Naxen, Raoul of Goldenlake, and Prince Jonathan of Conté; Princess Thayet of Sarain; Liam Ironarm, a martial-arts champion; and Buriram (Buri) Tourakom, Thayet's bodyguard. Her principal rivals are classmate Ralon of Malven and Jonathan's kinsman Duke Roger.

In the second volume, Alanna also acquires the magical cat "Faithful", who accompanies her thereafter. (Faithful is hinted to be an immortal, but his origins remain unknown.) Because of her double identity as a girl masquerading as a boy, small size, magic, and impatience, Alanna often questions her own character. In the third book, she becomes an honorary member of the "Bazhir", a Bedouin-like ethnicity, and gains acceptance as a warrior, mage and a woman. In the final volume, Alanna becomes King's Champion to Jonathan and Baroness of the coastal estate Pirate's Swoop, following her marriage to George Cooper, newly minted Baron of Pirate's Swoop.

== Characters ==
- Alanna of Trebond: The protagonist of the series: a noble-born, stubborn tomboy with bright, violet eyes and a wicked temper, but capable of earning loyalty and friendship. She is the first female knight in centuries in the land of Tortall, after disguising herself as a boy throughout her training.
- Thom of Trebond: Alanna's twin: a powerful magician, but often arrogant and prideful. Fellow-conspirator in creating 'Alan', Alanna's alter-ego. Throughout the novels Thom and Alanna exchange letters regarding Duke Roger of Conté. Thom becomes the youngest Master of the Mithran Light at the age of eighteen during In the Hand of the Goddess. Thom was convinced by Delia of Eldorne to raise Roger from the dead. While bringing Roger back to life was successful, Roger eventually drained Thom's magic, resulting in Thom's death.
- Coram Smythesson: Alanna's bodyguard, loyal servant, and lifelong caretaker; a former soldier and Alanna's fellow conspirator in hiding her true gender. He later marries Rispah, George's cousin and part of the Corus criminal underworld, and is given the fief of Trebond by Alanna.
- George Cooper: A clairvoyant thief, trickster, and fighter who controls the capital city's criminal population as the King of Thieves; Alanna's friend, and periodically her lover; ultimately commissioned 'Baron of Pirate's Swoop' by King Jonathan, and (at the end of the last volume) married to Alanna.
- Rispah Cooper: George's cousin and assistant, head of the Corus flower sellers; later Coram's wife; cheerful, decisive, and compassionate.
- Jonathan of Conté: The crown prince of the kingdom Tortall; a ring-leader among the students trained in the capital. Alanna's friend, sponsor, and periodic lover; also an ally cultivated by George. Intelligent, handsome, charismatic, and decisive.
- Gareth of Naxen the Younger (Gary): Jonathan's unofficial second-in-command among the students; a whimsical and sharp-tongued but intelligent character, and Alanna's closest friend. Gary is the son of Duke Gareth the Elder, who is in charge of page and squire training.
- Raoul of Goldenlake: A fellow-student of Jonathan and Gary's; Alanna's friend; large, taciturn, and shy.
- Alex of Tirragen: A fellow-student of Alanna's; at first Alanna's friend, but later her rival after he becomes squire to Duke Roger of Conté. Slain by her in the final book.
- Ralon of Malven: A fellow-student of Jonathan's. Unsuccessfully tried to bully Alanna, beating up on her instead. He left the palace in shame after she beat him in an unarmed fight. He later became involved with the Court of the Rogue under the name 'Claw,' and was eventually slain by George Cooper.
- Thayet jian Wilima (Later Thayet the Peerless or Thayet of Conté): An exiled Saren princess befriended by Alanna; later married to Jonathan; a deft horsewoman and archer. Graceful, intelligent, confident, and compassionate. Regarded as the most beautiful woman in the world.
- Buriram Tourakom (Buri): Thayet's fiercely loyal bodyguard; later Raoul's amorous interest during the (Protector of the Small series), and wife (in the Daughter of the Lioness Series.)
- Liam Ironarm: A martial-arts champion, called the Shang Dragon, who attaches himself to Alanna, alternately as lover and instructor. Slain by her enemies defending the Tortallan crown.
- Duke Roger of Conté: Prince Jonathan's cousin and would-be usurper: suspected by Alanna in the first book, killed by her in the second, absent from the third, and resurrected in the fourth, wherein he is again killed by Alanna.

== Themes ==
=== Gender ===
The series covers Alanna's life and development as she disguises herself and lives as a male. This causes a lot of gender discussion. At first it is easy for her to disguise herself as a boy because she is still prepubescent, but in her first year of training to be a knight she goes through puberty and gets her first period. This causes quite a bit of self-searching as Alanna struggles with her identity as a female while living as a boy.

She does reveal to a select close few her female side, sometimes intentionally and other times not, but still struggles with it even as they encourage her to explore both the sides she has available to her. This theme is one of the reasons the series received a feminist regard as it was open and honest towards the female body and its limitations versus being able to push oneself beyond that.

In 2019, Pierce posted on Twitter that "Alanna has always defied labels. She took the best bits of being a woman and a man, and created her own unique identity. I think the term is 'gender-fluid', though there wasn't a word for this (to my knowledge) when I was writing her."

=== Bullying ===
The series as a whole pays attention to the struggles Alanna faces due to her small frame, and her magic abilities. She spends the first half of Alanna: The First Adventure being beaten up by a bully, and eventually fights back with the support of her friends. This theme being played up in the series has been a big part towards the use of these novels in classes as it teaches some of the faults towards bullying and what is wrong with it and why this book is worth teaching.

== Books ==
1. Alanna: The First Adventure
2. In the Hand of the Goddess
3. The Woman Who Rides Like a Man
4. Lioness Rampant

== Awards and honors ==
- Margaret Edwards Award (The Song of the Lioness quartet)
- Alanna: The First Adventure
- Children's Book of the Month Club
- 17th Annual New Jersey Writers Conference
- Recommended Fantasy List- YA division of the American Library Association
- Popular Paperbacks for Young Adults- Young Adult Library Services Association

== Author ==
American author Tamora Pierce published Alanna: The First Adventure, the first book in The Song of the Lioness quartet, in 1983. Tamora Pierce is said to have turned to writing at a young age as a means of escape from a troubled family life. Pierce drew much of her inspiration from other fantasy series such as The Lord of the Rings by J. R. R. Tolkien. Pierce set out to not only create an epic fantasy adventure, but to populate it with a strong female protagonist. Pierce saw the need for a female protagonist in the significant lacking of such heroes in the fantasy novels she enjoyed as a child, often stating that she wrote what she as a young-adult would have enjoyed. Originally, Pierce had written her acclaimed quartet as a single adult novel but, following editorial advice, rewrote it into the now famous young-adult fantasy series. Pierce has said that she based the character of Alanna on her sister.

== Reception ==
Pierce's book has been selected Recommended Fantasy List in June 1991, Popular Paperbacks for Young Adults in 2003 and Young Adult Library Services Association by YALSA. Her book has also been nominated South Carolina Children's Book Awards from 1985 to 1986. She has won Bookworm's Prize by ZDF Schüler-Express.

== Publishing information ==
Alanna: The First Adventure, was first published in 1983 by Atheneum Books, and then Random House Inc. The following books were published in 1984, 1986, and 1988, respectively. The series started out as a 732-page novel titled the Song of the Lioness, but her editor, Jean Karl, thought parts were too inappropriate for children and Tamora Pierce edited it into the present series.

== Merchandise ==
In November of 2018, the first line of officially licensed merchandise was created in partnership with Dual Wield Studio, featuring a selection of pins, apparel and accessories developed in collaboration with creators from the Tamora Pierce fanbase. The collection expanded in 2020 to include a rendition of the map of Tortall and continues to grow.

At the end of 2023, Dual Wield Studio announced a new collection celebrating the 40th anniversary of Alanna: The First Adventure.
