= An American Plague =

2003 nonfiction book by Jim Murphy

An American Plague: The True and Terrifying Story of the Yellow Fever Epidemic of 1793
- First edition
- Author: Jim Murphy
- Language: English
- Genre: Nonfiction
- Publisher: Clarion Books
- Publication date: June 3rd 2003
- Publication place: United States
- Media type: Print (hardback)
- Pages: 176 pgs
- ISBN: 978-0-395-77608-7
- OCLC: 50958941

An American Plague: The True and Terrifying Story of the Yellow Fever Epidemic of 1793 is a 2003 nonfiction adolescent history by author Jim Murphy published by Clarion Books. An American Plague was one of the finalists in the 2003 National Book Award and was a 2004 Newbery Honor Book. It portrays the agony and pain this disease brought upon the American people marking its place in history in order to never be forgotten.

== Plot ==
The book takes place during the 1793 Philadelphia yellow fever epidemic. At this point Philadelphia is considered to be the largest city located in North America. The city is hit with an incurable and unknown disease which kills about 50% of the people affected. The author Jim Murphy describes a disease called the yellow fever and how it affected the residents of Philadelphia. In the novel he highlights the heroic roles and actions that the Philadelphia free blacks took in order to fight this deadly disease, and how it causes a constitutional crisis that leads president George Washington to leave the city of Philadelphia. The cure for the disease was not found until centuries later.

== Characters ==
Dr. Benjamin Rush: Developed a radical treatment process for the yellow fever disease which involved withdrawing blood from patients and giving patients mercury and the root of a poisonous plant.

Mayor Matthew Clarkson: The only government leader who stayed to deal with the issues that were going on in Philadelphia when the plague was taking place.

President George Washington: Was involved with foreign affairs when the plague struck and was out of touch with the government affairs for the time length of six weeks while the plague was taking over Philadelphia.

Thomas Jefferson: Was the Secretary of State when the plague struck Philadelphia.

Edmond-Charles Genêt: Was the French Ambassador who wanted the Americans to help France with their revolution.

The Reverend J. Henry c. Helmuth: Believed that the plague was a punishment sent by god because there was an increase in gambling as well as in drinking among the people of Philadelphia.

Absalom Jones: Was involved in the building of the St. George's United Methodist Church and, after participating and helping build the church, was told to sit in the back of the church by the church leaders.

Mathew Carey: Wrote a book that was pronounced to be a best seller titled "A Short Account of the Malignant Fever"

Dr. William Currie: Believed that the fever came from a shipment that came from the West Indies and claimed that it was not the yellow fever.

== Critical reception ==
Critics that were able to engage with the book found it to be very intriguing. It has been stated that Jim Murphy created an impeccable book that draws the reader in while at the same time creating fear. He is able to describe how horrid this period of time was for history with solid research and amazing facts. "In a lavishly illustrated book, containing maps, newspaper columns and period illustrations, Jim Murphy unflinchingly presents the horrors of the event as well as its heroes" states Anita Silvey. Kirkus Reviews named it Starred Review and found the book to be "A mesmerizing, macabre account...powerful evocative prose... compelling subject matter...fascinating discussion...valuable lesson in reading and writing history. Stellar.""Leisurely, lyrical tone...Murphy injects the events with immediacy...archival photographs...bring the story to life...comprehensive history." was Publishers Weekly's opinion about the work. Murphy spotlights the heroic role of Philadelphia's free blacks in combating the disease, and the Constitutional crisis that President Washington faced when he was forced to leave the city — and all his papers — while escaping the deadly contagion.

== Awards ==
- Sibert Medal
- Newbery Honor
- National Book Award Finalist
- 2010 Margaret Edwards Award - one of five titles contributing to Murphy receiving the award.
