= In the Hand of the Goddess =

1984 novel by Tamora Pierce

- Original Atheneum U.S. hardcover of the book featuring the title character.
- Author: Tamora Pierce
- Cover artist: David Weisner
- Language: English
- Series: The Song of the Lioness
- Genre: Fantasy novel
- Publisher: Atheneum Books
- Publication date: 1984
- Publication place: United States
- Media type: Print (Hardback & Paperback)
- Pages: 232 pp (first edition, hardback)
- ISBN: 0-689-31054-4 (first edition, hardback)
- OCLC: 10559619
- LC Class: PZ7.P61464 In 1984
- Preceded by: Alanna: The First Adventure
- Followed by: The Woman Who Rides Like a Man

In the Hand of the Goddess is a 1984 fantasy novel by Tamora Pierce, the second in a series of four books, The Song of the Lioness. It details the squire- and knighthood of Alanna of Trebond, who has hidden her real sex in order to become a knight.

== Plot introduction ==
Alanna, now squire to Prince Jonathan of Conte, has to protect her dreams of knighthood and friends through their first war with Tusaine. She slowly learns more about her gift, using it primarily to heal, and continues to hide her true gender while both George and Jon have fallen in love with her. She continues to be suspicious of and protect Jon from his power-mad first cousin, Roger, on the way to her becoming a full-fledged knight.

== Plot summary ==
While camping in the woods on her way back to Corus from an errand, Alanna's campsite, set up under a willow tree, is discovered by a small black cat whom she names Faithful. It does not escape Alanna's notice that his eyes are as purple as her own; she also finds out that Faithful can talk to her, although to others it sounds as if he is meowing. Soon after, the Great Mother Goddess, Alanna's patron, shows up at her campfire. She gives Alanna an amulet that allows the young woman to see magic being worked around her.

As she progresses into knighthood, Alanna's feminine side is nurtured as well. After a few visits with Eleni, George Cooper's mother, Alanna realizes that part of her wants to act like the ladies she sees in the Court. Eleni takes Alanna under her wing and secretly teaches her how to dress and behave like a woman. The change does not go unnoticed by George or Prince Jonathan, the only two friends with whom she has shared her secret about her sex. Jon and Alanna share their first kiss after he rescues her when she is kidnapped by nobles from Tusaine, and they become lovers soon after, although George made it clear to Alanna that he loved her before they went to war.

Alanna withstands the Ordeal of Knighthood and becomes a knight. Her twin brother, Thom, presents her with a shield featuring the crest of their home estate, Trebond. When he and Alanna are alone after the ceremony, he shows her that when she is ready to reveal to everyone that she is a woman, the Trebond crest will disappear, and in its place will be the picture of a golden Lioness rearing on a field of red.

Alanna discovers her long-time nemesis, Duke Roger of Conte, her prince's cousin, has a plan to kill the king, queen, Jonathan, and even Alanna herself in order to take the throne. After her knighthood, Alanna accuses Roger publicly and he demands a duel. During the duel, he accidentally slices through the special corset Alanna wears to keep her breasts flat, revealing to everyone that she is very much a woman. Her friends, including Jonathan and Myles, step up and tell the king that they knew beforehand that she was a female. Driven to rage at being challenged by a woman, Roger attacks and attempts to use an illusion to confuse Alanna. She uses the amulet given to her by the Goddess in the beginning of the novel and, spotting the deception, is able to defeat and kill Roger.

After her battle, Alanna decides not to stick around to deal with the initial uproar over her sex. With Faithful, her longtime manservant Coram, and her horse Moonlight, she has a tearful goodbye with Jonathan and sets off for the desert in the South, in search of more adventure.

== Principal characters ==
- King Ain – Tusaine's King
- Sir Alanna of Trebond – A squire and later a Knight
- Sir Alex – once Alanna's friend, later Roger's squire, and Knight, tries to kill Alanna
- Duke Baird – chief healer at the palace
- Coram Smythesson
- Delia of Eldorne – one of the Queen's Ladies, a great beauty, Roger sends her to chase after Jonathan.
- Faithful – Alanna's purple-eyed cat given her by the Goddess
- Duke Gareth of Naxen – Gary's father
- Gareth (Gary) of Naxen – Son of Duke Gareth, Jon and Alanna's friend, instructs Alanna before her Ordeal
- George Cooper- King of the Rogue, Alanna's friend
- Duke Hilam – King Ain's brother and Prime Minister
- Jonathan of Conté – crown prince of Tortall, Alanna's friend and later, her lover
- Moonlight – Alanna's faithful steed
- Myles of Olau – Alanna's friend and mentor, a knight and teacher
- Raoul of Goldenlake – Knight, friend of Alanna and Jon
- Duke Roger of Contè – Jonathan's cousin and Alanna's greatest enemy, Roger plots to kill the King, Queen and Jonathan to have the throne of Tortall to himself
- Thom of Trebond – Alanna's brother, studying sorcery in the City of the Gods, passes his Mastery at 17 when most don't even try until 30
