= The Woman Who Rides Like a Man =

1986 novel by Tamora Pierce

- Original Atheneum U.S. hardcover of the book featuring the title character.
- Author: Tamora Pierce
- Cover artist: David Weisner
- Language: English
- Series: The Song of the Lioness
- Genre: Fantasy
- Publisher: Atheneum Books
- Publication date: 1986
- Publication place: United States
- Media type: Print (hardback & paperback)
- Pages: 253 pp (HB)
- ISBN: 0-689-31117-6 (HB)
- OCLC: 12551271
- LC Class: PZ7.P61464 Wo 1986
- Preceded by: In the Hand of the Goddess
- Followed by: Lioness Rampant

The Woman Who Rides Like a Man is a fantasy novel by Tamora Pierce, the third in a series of four books, The Song of the Lioness. It details the knighthood of Alanna of Trebond as she lives in the Bazhir desert after becoming a knight.

== Plot introduction ==
A newly knighted Alanna leaves the capital to travel among the Bazhir in the desert and after being attacked by bandits and her sword breaking, she gets adopted by one of the tribes, though clashing with the tribe's shaman who seeks to destroy her name with the sword that broke her own. After fighting to the death with the shaman for her honor and winning, she has to replace the shaman and cannot leave until she trains another. After training the first 2 girl shamen she rides back home and fixes her sword.

== Plot summary ==
The third book sees Alanna through her journey through the Bazhir desert, where she and her manservant Coram are adopted by the Bloody Hawk tribe of the Bazhir people. Alanna is forced to duel with the tribe's crazed, senile shaman who is convinced Alanna is evil, and kills him. According to Bazhir law she must now be the tribe's shaman until she trains another to replace her - or someone kills her and takes her place.

Alanna selects three Gifted children of the tribe, Ishak, Kara, and Kourrem, and begins to train them in magic. She also inherits the former shaman's sword, with a crystal on the hilt, symbols that remind her of the dead sorcerer Duke Roger, and a terrifying amount of dark power. She keeps it because her old sword, Lightning, broke during a battle. She also teaches the traditional Bazhir to slowly lose some of their prejudice against women. During their training, Alanna sees glimpses of the shamans the girls will become, but the boy, Ishak, constantly attempts stronger, darker sorcery. In a sudden encounter, Ishak steals the crystal sword from Alanna and tries to master its power, but it consumes him and kills him. Devastated but determined, Alanna continues to train Kara and Kourrem.

Prince Jonathan and Sir Myles of Olau make a visit to the Bloody Hawk tribe, where Jonathan and Alanna renew their love affair and spend a passionate night together. When Jonathan asks her to marry him, Alanna is shocked and asks for time to think it over. During their stay, Jonathan is adopted by the tribe and takes up training under the Voice of the Tribes, an old friend of Alanna's and Jonathan's. When the Voice dies, Jonathan is made the new Voice, thus acting as a sacred link between all the Bazhir tribes. This status will help unite northerners and southerners when he eventually becomes King of Tortall. Also, Myles adopts Alanna as his daughter and heir to his lands. Jonathan, tired from the Rite of the Voice, wants to go home soon and assumes that Alanna will marry him though she has asked for time to think about it, and when he begins to make arrangements for her to return to Corus with him, they argue. She refuses to marry him, and he wounds her deeply by saying he'd rather marry a woman who knows how to act like a woman. Jonathan and Myles leave, and Alanna continues her training of Kourrem and Kara, who eventually pass the required tests and are made shamans for the tribe, Kourrem being the head shaman.

Their work with the Bazhir finished and with Alanna in need of distraction from her breakup with Jonathan, Alanna and Coram travel to Port Caynn to visit the thief-king George Cooper, who is putting down a Rogue rebellion there. While Coram woos George's cousin Rispah, Alanna begins a love affair with George, who has loved her for years, but when he wants her to return to Corus with him, she refuses to go with him. The two split, and Coram accompanies Alanna back to the desert, where the Bloody Hawk chief asks her to check on a sorceress, a friend of his, whom he has been having bad dreams about. When Alanna and Coram arrive at the sorceress' drought-stricken village, they see the starved, crazed villagers burning the sorceress, thinking the sacrifice will please the gods and provide them food. Alanna and Coram rescue her, but not in time, and the sorceress dies after leaving Alanna with a scroll to give to the Bloody Hawk chief. The chief tells them it is a map to the Dominion Jewel, a legendary stone that provides untold powers in the hands of Gifted or unGifted rulers. Alanna and Coram decide to go after it.

== Characters ==
- Alanna of Trebond – Now knighted and a shaman of the Bazhir
- Jonathan of Conté – Heir apparent to the throne of Tortall
- George Cooper – Tortall's King of Thieves, in love with Alanna
- Myles of Olau – Alanna's friend and mentor, who later adopts her as his heir.
- Ali Mukhtab – Voice of the Tribes
- Coram Smythesson – Alanna's manservant
- Kara and Kourrem – Alanna's female trainee shamans. They jointly become shamans of the Bloody Hawk tribe after Alanna.
- Ishak – Alanna's male trainee shaman. He is killed by the crystal sword when he attempts to wield it.
- Halef Seif – Headman of the Bloody Hawk tribe.
