= Lioness Rampant =

1988 novel by Tamora Pierce

- Original Atheneum U.S. hardcover of the book featuring the title character.
- Author: Tamora Pierce
- Cover artist: Michael Hays
- Language: English
- Series: The Song of the Lioness
- Genre: Fantasy novel
- Publisher: Atheneum Books
- Publication date: 1988
- Publication place: United States
- Media type: Print (Hardback & Paperback)
- ISBN: 0-689-31116-8 (first edition, paperback)
- OCLC: 17619765
- LC Class: PZ7.P61464 Li 1988
- Preceded by: The Woman Who Rides Like a Man

Lioness Rampant is a fantasy novel by Tamora Pierce, the fourth and last in a series of books, The Song of the Lioness. It details an adventure of the knight Alanna of Trebond, and her final battle with her archenemy, Duke Roger of Conte.

== Characters ==
- Alanna of Trebond – Heroine.
- Jonathan of Conté – Prince, and later king of Tortall; Alanna's friend and former paramour.
- Gareth of Naxen the Younger – one of Alanna's friends; has succeeded his father as governor of the capital city.
- Raoul of Goldenlake – Another of Alanna's friends, and commander of the King's bodyguard.
- Alex of Tirragen – Yet another friend of Alanna's, who defects to her enemies' side.
- George Cooper – The capital city's 'King of the Thieves': Jonathan's spy, and ultimately Alanna's fiancé.
- Thom of Trebond – Alanna's twin brother: a powerful but arrogant magician.
- Roger of Conté – Antagonist: Jonathan's cousin and rival.
- Liam the Shang Dragon – a master of martial arts; Alanna's friend and paramour.
- Princess Thayet jian Wilima – a K'mir Princess of Sarain, Tortall's neighbor. Later Jonathan's queen.
- Buriram Tourakom – Thayet's maidservant and bodyguard.
- Princess Josiane of the Copper Isles – a traitor conspiring with Roger.
- Delia of Eldorne – Roger's former lover and assistant.
- Si-cham – Priest of the Mithran Order who tries to help Thom overcome his illness.
- Rispah – George's cousin. Marries Coram.
- Myles of Olau – A nobleman, and Alanna's adoptive father.
- Eleni Cooper – George's mother. Later marries Myles of Olau.
- Faithful – Alanna's telepathic cat, given her by her presiding goddess.
- Coram – Alanna's friend and caregiver since birth.

== Plot summary ==
The first chapter of this book finds Alanna, Faithful, and Coram on a quest for the 'Dominion Jewel', which grants immense psychokinetic power to any monarch who owns it. In the town of Berat, Alanna befriends martial-arts champion Liam Ironarm, called the 'Dragon of Shang', who joins the quest. Liam begins training her in Shang fighting style, and the two become lovers. The party thence traverse the realm of Sarain, evading a civil war between the native 'K'miri' tribes and the ruler, Warlord jin Wilima, and acquire new companions in Princess Thayet, the Warlord's only child, and her K’miri protector Buriram Tourokom. At the mountain range known as the 'Roof of the World', Alanna becomes frustrated by the blizzards blocking their progress and her magical sense that trouble is occurring back in Tortall. She casts a spell on the group to keep them asleep and then ascends to the pass, where she undergoes a grueling physical trial to acquire the Jewel from its immortal guardian, Chitral. She succeeds in winning the Jewel and returns to the group, to find that Liam—who is afraid of magic—is angry at being bewitched by her. Their romantic relationship ends, though they continue as friends and colleagues.

Upon their return to Tortall, Alanna is met by her old friend Raoul of Goldenlake, who informs her of three key events that have occurred in her absence: the Tortallan monarchs have died; Prince Jonathan has been named King but not yet been crowned; and Alanna's twin brother Thom, to prove himself the most powerful sorcerer in the realm, has resurrected Duke Roger (killed by Alanna in an earlier book). Alanna hurries to take Jonathan's side and give him the Dominion Jewel, and Jonathan names her as his King's Champion. Elsewhere in Corus, Thom is being rapidly poisoned by his own magic, by its interaction with that of Roger. On the eve of the Coronation, Tortall's Great Mother Goddess warns Alanna that the ceremony will be a "crossroad in time", decisive of the realm's future. During the coronation, Roger’s plan comes to fruition: he causes a series of magical earthquakes using his and Thom’s joined power to bring down the palace, while insurgents loyal to Roger and his allies Lady Delia of Eldorne, Alex of Tirragen (Alanna’s childhood friend), and Claw, aka Ralon of Malven (Alanna’s former bully) storm the palace. Jonathan uses his Gift and unleashes the Dominion Jewel’s power to keep the earthquakes at bay, while Alanna‘s friends battle to protect Jonathan from assassination and Alanna goes in search of Roger. In the prolonged battle, Thom dies, drained of his life by Roger's magic, Alanna kills Alex in a duel, and Claw is slain by George. Alanna then kills Josianne, after the princess has killed Si Cham and Faithful. Roger awaits her in the catacombs, presiding over a Gate of Idramm. He reveals how he survived his death due to Sorcerer's Sleep, as well as his hand in Lightning's origins. Weary and temporarily Giftless, Alanna remains ready for battle. Roger summons Lightning toward him, and after resisting, she realizes the benefit of having the sword fly toward him. In less than the blink of an eye, Roger is impaled by the force of the sword's movement. Alanna emerges from the battle to find in the aftermath that Jonathan and her friends survived, the insurgents are defeated and captured, but Liam Ironarm was killed defending Jonathan.

Later, Alanna returns to the Bazhir (a Bedouin-like ethnicity of Tortall's southern desert) to recover from her losses, while Delia is sentenced to life imprisonment. She learns that Jonathan has married Thayet—a match Alanna had given her blessing to—and appointed George a baron to guard Tortall's coast. George arrives in the desert to seek out Alanna, who professes her mutual love for him. The two head exit the tent to tell the Bloody Hawk tribe of their betrothal.
