= Suza Scalora =

American photographer

- Born: Suza Scalora
- Known for: Photography
- Awards: Hasselblad Masters Award; 2005

Suza Scalora is an American photographic artist and author whose work explores a world of fairies and angels. She lives in New York City.

== Early life ==
She studied photography at the Art Center College of Design in Pasadena, California.

== Photographs ==
Scalora worked as a photographer in New York City, with advertising clients including Origins, Avon, Disney, and Little Brown. She has been profiled in industry publications such as PDN, Communication Arts, Elle, GQ, and American Photo. Her pictures have appeared in Time magazine. In February 2005 she was awarded a prize by camera maker Hasselblad. In 2006, she was named one of the best up and coming beauty photographers by Women's Wear Daily.

She appeared on the TV show Make Me a Supermodel as the official photographer. Scalora said: "I was so excited when the producers asked me to be a part of the show. After all, I had complete creative freedom and was able to combine some of my favorite things including intense color, texture, and the beautiful curves of the body."

Scalora's photographs have appeared in fashion magazines, news magazines, television, book covers, online art auctions, and websites. Her bestseller The Fairies featured her photography for younger readers. Her photographs of fairies and angels have been described by critics as "spookily lovely" and "magical."

== Books ==
Scalora illustrated Francesca Lia Block's 1989 book Weetzie Bat. In 1995, Scalora launched website "Myth.com" about the ethereal world featuring her photographic artistry and which has been described "ambitious" and "intriguing." Scalora illustrated Lynne Ewing's book The Talisman. Scalora's (1999) The Fairies: Photographic Evidence of the Existence of Another World was described as one of the "ten best picture books of the year" by Newsweek magazine.

Newsweek book critic David Gates described the digital images as "glossy, spookily lovely processed photos" in a book which was purportedly about "a scholarly expedition to document and catalog fairies" in which "kids will see a visionary world of sadness and cruelty, beauty and grace." A critic at USA Today described Scalora's The Witches and Wizards of Oberin and The Fairies as "gorgeously illustrated books" adding that "little ones (children) will love the magical pics; the older set will have fun recognizing some of today’s famous faces." In 2009, Scalora wrote Evidence of Angels in collaboration with Francesca Lia Block on a book for teenage readers with photographic evidence that "fairies are real."

== Publications ==
- The Fairies: Photographic Evidence of the Existence of Another World by Suza Scalora (Hardcover - Sep 22, 1999) 978-0060282349 48 pages Publisher: HarperTeen; 1st THUS edition (September 22, 1999) Reading level: Ages 9–12
- The Witches and Wizards of Oberin by Suza Scalora (Hardcover - Aug 21, 2001) # Reading level: Young Adult Hardcover: 48 pages Publisher: HarperTeen; 1st edition (August 21, 2001 Language: English ISBN 0-06-029535-X ISBN 978-0-06-029535-6
- Evidence of Angels by Suza Scalora and Francesca Lia Block Sep 29, 2009) (Official release date: September 29, 2009) Publisher: HarperCollins ISBN 0-06-124343-4 ISBN 978-0-06-124343-1
- Doggie's Angel 2007 Calendar by Francis Hills, Shun & Heideki, Daniel O'neal, Michael Maples, Lionel Deluy, Jeff Xander, Suza Scalora, 2007
