= Jen Bryant =

American poet and children's writer (born 1960)

- Born: Jennifer Fisher; May 13, 1960 (age 66); Easton, Pennsylvania, U.S.
- Occupations: Children's and young adult writer and poet
- Writing career
- Genres: Non-fiction, picture books, biographies, novels, poetry
- Website: www.jenbryant.com

Jen Bryant (born 1960) is an American poet, novelist, and children's writer.

Bryant has won several awards for her work, including the Robert F. Sibert International Book Medal for The Right Word: Roget and His Thesaurus, the NCTE Orbis Pictus Award, and the Charlotte Zolotow Honor Award for A River of Words: The Story of William Carlos Williams, and the Schneider Family Book Award for Six Dots: A Story of Young Louis Braille.

Two of her books, The Right Word: Roget and His Thesaurus and A River of Words: The Story of William Carlos Williams, have been awarded Caldecott Honors for Melissa Sweet's artwork in them.

== Early life and education ==
Bryant (née Jennifer Fisher) was born in 1960, in Easton, Pennsylvania, and grew up in Flemington, New Jersey. Bryant grew up next to a funeral home, where her father and grandfather were undertakers. She was fascinated by the manual typewriter her father used and would "try and copy whatever material happened to be lying around: drafts of obituaries. And what are obituaries, really, but one's life summed up in a paragraph or two? Good ones leave an impression of the person as an individual. I suppose as I practiced typing them, I must have absorbed some of the craft behind the writing of these little ‘biographies'."

She graduated from Hunterdon Central Regional High School in Flemington, New Jersey, in 1978 and attended Gettysburg College in Gettysburg, Pennsylvania, where she received her bachelor's degree in French and minored in German and secondary education.

== Career ==
After graduating from Gettysburg College, Bryant taught French and German at Paul VI Catholic High School in Chantilly, Virginia, where she also coached their cross country teams.

After moving with her family to Chester County, Pennsylvania, Bryant began to write poetry, to study independently with poet Tina Barr, and to host poetry readings in local independent bookstores. Encouraged and mentored by authors Eileen Spinelli and Jerry Spinelli, she began to write picture books and novels in verse and to submit them to publishers. She continued to teach and to write while obtaining a M.A. in English from Arcadia University in 1999, where she was mentored by poet David Keplinger.

In 1999, Bryant taught writing and children's literature at West Chester University in West Chester, Pennsylvania, and delivered lectures and workshops for schools and colleges. She continued writing poetry for adults and novels and picture books for children, eventually focusing on children's literature. Bryant's writing for children has been recognized with the Robert F. Sibert International Book Medal, the NCTE Orbis Pictus Award, the Charlotte Zolotow Honor Award, and the Schneider Family Book Award.

In May 2013, along with Julia Chang Bloch and David Gergen, Bryant received an honorary doctorate degree from Gettysburg College, her alma mater. She currently serves on the board of trustees for Gettysburg College.

== Personal life ==
Bryant lives with her family in Allegheny County, Pennsylvania.

== Published works ==
=== Non-fiction picture book biographies ===
- Working Moms: A Portrait of their Lives (six of seven books in the career series from 1990 to 1991)
- Georgia's Bones, illustrated by Bethanne Andersen (about Georgia O'Keeffe), 2005
- Music for the End of Time (about Olivier Messiaen), 2005)
- Call Me Marianne, illustrated by David A. Johnson (about Marianne Moore), 2006
- A River of Words: The Story of William Carlos Williams, illustrated by Melissa Sweet (2008)
- A Splash of Red: The Life and Art of Horace Pippin, illustrated by Melissa Sweet (2013)
- The Right Word: Roget and His Thesaurus, illustrated by Melissa Sweet (2014)
- Six Dots: A Story of Young Louis Braille, illustrated by Boris Kulikov (2016)
- Feed Your Mind: A Story of August Wilson, illustrated by Cannaday Chapman (2019)
- Above the Rim: How Elgin Baylor Changed Basketball, illustrated by Frank Morrison (2020)
- Fall Down Seven Times, Stand Up Eight: Patsy Takemoto Mink and the Fight for Title IX, illustrated by Toshiki Nakamura (2022)
- Foote Was First! How One Curious Woman Connected Carbon Dioxide and Climate Change, illustrated by Amy June Bates (2026)

=== Middle-grade and young adult biographies ===
- Marjory Stoneman Douglas: Voice of the Everglades, illustrated by Larry Raymond (1992)
- Margaret Murie: A Wilderness Life, illustrated by Antonio Castro (1993)
- Louis Braille, Inventor (1994)
- Henri de Toulouse-Lautrec: Artist (1995)
- Lucretia Mott: A Guiding Light (1996)
- Thomas Merton: Poet, Prophet, Priest (1997)

=== Novels in verse ===
- The Trial (2004)
- Pieces of Georgia (2006)
- Ringside, 1925: Views from the Scopes Trial (2008)
- Kaleidoscope Eyes (2009)

=== Novels in prose ===
- The Fortune of Carmen Navarro (2010)

=== Poetry ===
- The Whole Measure (chapbook), Greyhounds Press, 2006
- Hand Crafted (chapbook), Nova House Press, 2001
- Individual poems published in American Literary Review, Clackamas Literary Review, Paterson Literary Review, Poet Lore, Smartish Pace, Comstock Review, The Pittsburgh Quarterly, Journal of NJ Poets, Northeast Corridor, Schuylkill Valley Journal, and others.

=== Magazines and anthologies ===
Bryant's poems and articles have appeared in Highlights magazine and Image, and others. Her work is anthologized in Rush Hour: A Journal of Contemporary Voices (Delacorte Press); You Just Wait, The Poetry Friday Anthology; The Poetry Anthology for Middle School (all Pomelo Press); and One Minute Till Bedtime (Little, Brown).

=== Translations and adaptations ===
Several children's books by Bryant have been translated into Spanish, Korean, Chinese, Japanese, and Hebrew. Six Dots, her biography of inventor Louis Braille, is available in a print braille edition.

A Splash of Red: The Life and Art of Horace Pippin was adapted for the stage by the Seattle Repertory Theatre.

== Awards and honors ==
- Above the Rim: How Elgin Baylor Changed Basketball
  - NCTE Orbis Pictus Award, 2021
- Call Me Marianne
  - Society of Illustrators, Original Art annual exhibition, 2006
- Feed Your Mind: A Story of August Wilson
  - Center for the Study of Multicultural Children's Literature Best Books, 2019
  - National Book Festival Choice for Pennsylvania
  - NCTE Notable Children's Book in Language Arts, 2019
  - Norman A. Sugarman Children's Biography Honor Book, 2020
  - Society of Illustrators The Original Art annual exhibition, 2019
- The Fortune of Carmen Navarro
  - Paterson Prize for Young People, 2011
- The Right Word: Roget and His Thesaurus
  - Caldecott Honor Book, 2015
  - The Horn Book Magazine'‘s Best Books of 2014
  - Maine Lupine Book Award, 2015
  - Orbis Pictus Honor Book, 2015
  - Robert F. Sibert Informational Book Medal, 2015
  - Society of Illustrators: The Original Art annual exhibition, 2014
- River of Words: The Story of William Carlos Williams, A
  - Caldecott Honor Book, 2009
  - Christian Science Monitor's "Best Children's Books, 2008"
  - Cooperative Children's Book Center Charlotte Zolotow Honor Award, 2009
  - NCTE Orbis Pictus Award, 2009
  - New York Times Book Review "Best Illustrated Children's Books of 2008"
- Six Dots: A Story of Young Louis Braille
  - ALA Schneider Family Book Award for Young Children, 2017
  - Society of Illustrators: The Original Art annual exhibition, 2016
- Splash of Red: The Life and Art of Horace Pippin, A
  - IBBY Outstanding Books for Children with Disabilities, 2015
  - NCTE Orbis Pictus Award, 2014
  - Robert F. Sibert Honor Book, 2014
  - Schneider Family Book Award: Ages 0–10, 2014
  - Society of Illustrators: The Original Art annual exhibition, 2015
