= Cherokee Bat and the Goat Guys =

Novel by Francesca Lia Block

- First edition
- Author: Francesca Lia Block
- Series: Dangerous Angels
- Publisher: HarperCollins
- Publication date: 1993
- ISBN: 978-0-06-447095-7
- Preceded by: Witch Baby
- Followed by: Missing Angel Juan

Cherokee Bat and the Goat Guys (1993) is the third book in the Dangerous Angels series by Francesca Lia Block. It focuses on Cherokee, the daughter of Weetzie Bat, and her friends as they start a band, find success, and deal with the corruption of their spirits.

== Plot summary ==
While the grown-ups are away making a movie, teenager Cherokee is left to cheer up her sort-of sister Witch Baby, who is deeply depressed. Cherokee makes her a pair of wings out of wire and feathers, and it cheers Witch Baby up due to an unexplained magical power. The two girls decided to start a band and enlist their two male friends, Raphael and Angel Juan.

As their band becomes successful, the other members acquire magical items to wear. Raphael begins to wear goat pants, Angel Juan gets horns, and Cherokee gets hoof-like boots. However, these items begin to lead them down a path of drugs, sex, and jealousy and things begin to unravel. In the end, Cherokee, disturbed by the changes in her friends, makes off with the magical costumes, causing her friends to re-examine their choices and find their way back to their normal selves.
