= Witch Baby =

Book by Francesca Lia Block

- First edition
- Author: Francesca Lia Block
- Series: Dangerous Angels
- Publisher: HarperCollins
- Publication date: 1991
- ISBN: 0-06-447065-2
- Preceded by: Weetzie Bat
- Followed by: Cherokee Bat and the Goat Guys

Witch Baby (1991) is the second book in the Dangerous Angels series of novels written by Francesca Lia Block. It follows the adventures of Witch Baby, a young purple eyed girl who lives with Weetzie Bat, My-Secret-Agent-Lover-Man, and the rest of their crazy clan.

Witch Baby is trying to find her place in the world and trying to understand the world around her, while trying to find a place in her own family. She meets a young man, Angel Juan, whose parents and large family are poor and illegal immigrants from Mexico, and realizes the structure of a family.

Witch Baby goes through great hardships to find her birth mother. Once she does she feels more accepted and content, however as she spends time with her mother she starts to miss her real family. She also finds out that her birth mother doesn't really love her, nor does she truly want Witch Baby.

In the end, Witch Baby returns home to Weetzie, My-Secret-Agent-Lover-Man, and the people who love her.
