= Margaret A. Edwards =

American librarian (1902–1988)

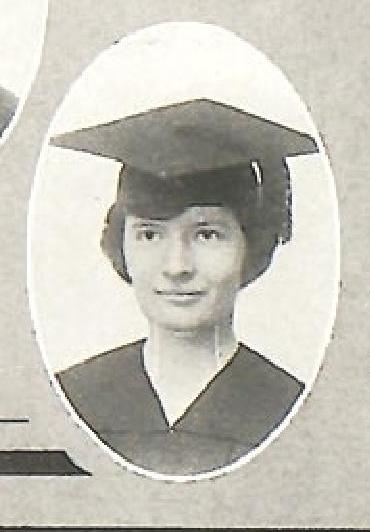
- Alexander at graduation in 1922
- Born: Margaret Alexander; October 23, 1902; Childress, Texas
- Died: April 19, 1988 (aged 85)
- Education: Trinity University, Columbia University
- Occupation: Librarian
- Employer: Enoch Pratt Free Library
- Spouse: Phillip Edwards

Margaret Alexander Edwards (October 23, 1902 – April 19, 1988) was an American educator and librarian who was at the forefront of the movement for young adult services in the 20th century. She is the namesake of the Margaret Edwards Award for young adult literature as well as the Alex Awards for adult literature that appeals to young adults.

== Early life ==
Margaret Edwards was born in the small farming community of Childress, Texas. She first learned to read using a Wine of Cardui calendar her mother received from a local druggist and she gained further practice by reading passages from a King James Version of the Bible with her sister and her mother, nightly. As a teenager, she attended Trinity University, in Waxahachie, Texas, gaining the education and skills necessary to become a Latin teacher after graduating in 1922. After teaching in Texas for several years, she moved to New York City where she attended Columbia University. In 1928, she received a master's degree in Latin. After almost 10 years of working in libraries, she went on to receive her degree in that field from the Columbia University School of Library Service in 1941.

== Career ==
=== Enoch Pratt Free Library ===
In 1932, Margaret Edwards was hired by Joseph L. Wheeler, director of the Enoch Pratt Free Library in Baltimore, Maryland, to begin training as a librarian's assistant. At that time, library services for young adults were already taking root in other parts of the country, with women like Jean Roos and Mabel Williams heading up the movement. At Enoch Pratt, Edwards's first position, under the direct supervision of Pauline McCauley, involved handling the small collection of young adult fiction tucked away at the back of the Popular materials section. It was there she realized that she needed to have a better knowledge of literature herself if she wanted to cultivate the minds of young people, and she began to read avidly. As she began to develop herself as a reader, she built upon the existing collection of young adult titles and, by 1940, she had established YA sections in each of the library's branches with the assistance of input from high school students who frequented the library.

Edwards was equally devoted to the betterment of the service provided by librarians to young adults and to the organization of the collections. She felt that to be an adequate YA librarian, one “must read widely and constantly to be able to recommend with assurance books for the slow, the gifted, those with special interests and those with no interests.” Thus, she established a training regimen in which all of her assistants were required to read ten titles from Books for the Teen Age, a list put together by the New York Public Library. Once the initial picks were completed, there would be individual conferences in which the selections were discussed and an assignment of ten more would be implemented. The cycle would repeat until the assistant had read a number of books that satisfied her standards.

==== Book talks ====
Edwards was determined to instill in young people the “importance of their public library, its reading resources, and the approachability of its staff.” One way of doing so was to take her work outside the library and into the schools, using “book talks” as a means of relaying the message to high school students. Though she did not invent book talks, she and other young adult staff members tailored them so as to provide each class of students they visited with lists, called Speaking Books, and allowed students to ask questions and openly discuss titles from the list. Though she encountered several obstacles, foremost among them actually being allowed into the schools, her persistence paid off. The book talks were largely successful over the course of time until both public and private schools all over Baltimore were requesting and receiving book talks.

==== Book wagon ====
Beginning in the summer of 1943, Margaret Edwards endeavored to bring books to the masses by creating her own version of a book mobile. She packed up a horse-drawn cart with books from the library, and drove the cart to the economically depressed areas of Baltimore. The book wagon was an instant success. She found that those who frequented the cart had an interest in books, especially books that could be applied to facets of their everyday lives, but might not otherwise partake in the services offered by a brick and mortar library because they had neither the time nor inclination to get to one. Edwards continued running the book wagon during summers until 1945.

=== American Library Association ===
Along with her work at Enoch Pratt, Margaret Edwards was actively involved with the American Library Association. She took her first position as the Secretary of the Young People's Reading Roundtable of the ALA in 1935 and would be named its chairperson in 1940. She also participated in several committees, including serving as chairperson to the BookList committee in 1938 and 1948 and becoming a member of the ALA Committee on Standards for Work with Young Adults in Public Libraries in 1960.

== The Fair Garden and the Swarm of Beasts ==
In 1969, Margaret Edwards' book, titled The Fair Garden and the Swarm of Beasts, was published. In its pages, she recounted important experiences from her life and career and how they pertained to shaping her world view. She also revealed many of her philosophies about young adults, including what their literary needs were, and how to approach them in the practice of librarianship. Reprints of the book were issued in 1974, in 1994, and in 2002.

== Awards and honors ==
By 1957, Margaret Edwards' work with the youth of the community had caught the attention of the ALA and she was presented with the Grolier Award.

After her death in 1988, she was further honored, when the Young Adult Library Services Association (YALSA) instituted an award in her name. The Margaret A. Edwards Award is presented annually to an author whose body of work has made a “significant and lasting contribution to young adult literature.”

== Margaret A. Edwards Trust ==
Part of Edwards' estate was used to form a trust to help in the continuance of work that would directly benefit young people. The trust was used to fund reprints of her book in 1994 and in 2002 through the ALA. The trust committee also “conferred recognition grants on fifty libraries with outstanding programs for young adults” which led to the publication of Excellence of Library Service to Young Adults: The Nation's Top Programs. The Alex Awards, presented by YALSA annually to 10 outstanding works of young adult literature and named after Edwards, are another project funded by the trust.
