= The Great Fire (Murphy novel) =

1995 children's novel by Jim Murphy

- Author: Jim Murphy
- Language: English
- Genre: Non-fiction
- Published: 1995
- Publisher: Scholastic Corporation
- Publication place: United States
- Media type: Hardcover, paperback
- Pages: 144 pp
- ISBN: 0590472674

The Great Fire is a story for children and young adults, written by Jim Murphy about the Great Chicago Fire of 1871, which caused the destruction of most of the city of Chicago. The Great Fire was a Newbery Medal honor book in 1996.

== Plot ==
The novel The Great Fire is about the great fire that happened in Chicago. The huge fire started in the O'Learys' barnyard and lasted for thirty hours. Daniel "Pegleg" Sullivan was the first to notice the fire and ran to save the cows in the barn and to tell the O'Learys that their property was on fire. William Lee, a neighbor of the O'Learys, hurried to the drugstore to turn in a fire alarm, but Bruno Goll, the owner of the drugstore, didn't allow him because all the fire trucks had left. Lee went back to his house to get his baby and wife out. Goll claimed that he turned in the alarm after Lee left the drugstore, but no alarm was recorded at the central alarm office.

The fire started to spread to other parts of the neighborhood and destroyed everything in its path. After several minutes, the fire trucks were sent to box 242, which was almost a mile away from the barn where the fire had started. After that, the fire trucks were sent again to the wrong location and the fire continued to spread. The fire advanced from the O'Learys' barn towards Jefferson Street before the firefighters finally showed up to the right location of the fire. They were exhausted from multiple fires over the past week and didn't have enough energy to stop the fire from spreading to other parts of the city. The residents of the area took whatever valuables they could from their houses and ran away from the fire.

Dorsey, a fireman, ran to the drugstore and pulled the lever to sound the fire alarm, but no one responded and the fire continued to grow with the power of the wind. It burned more houses and injured many firefighters. The fire was now headed towards north and east Chicago. The fire grew so big that the trucks weren't able to extinguish it. They had to leave the burned area in order to protect the other areas of the city. The people were all running away in different directions.

Claire, whose house was burned down, lost her family and ran into a dead end. She was trapped between the fire and the houses. She ran to the tallest house, jumped to the other side of the street, and kept running towards the south side of the city. To prevent the fire from moving towards the south side of the city, the firefighters blew up the houses and helped the residents of that area flee towards Lincoln Park, where they spent the night.

As the fire kept moving towards other parts of the city, it started to rain, which gave the people of the city hope. By morning the fire that devastated the city was no more. It had completely destroyed many parts of the city, caused 100,000 to become homeless, and killed about 300 people, with many reported missing.

After the fire, the people of Chicago began to rebuild the city and received aid from other states. The United States Army put up tents for the people that lost their houses.

Later, the residents of the city accused the O'Learys of starting the fire, which caused them to have to sell their property and leave Chicago because of fear that they might be killed by the angry citizens of Chicago.

Before the great fire that devastated it, Chicago was known as the Queen City of the West and the Gem of the Prairie. Now, it was nothing but dust.

== Characters ==
- Patrick O'Leary - Owner of the barn where the fire began.
- Catherine O'Leary - Wife of Patrick O'Leary; she is blamed for starting the fire.
- Daniel "Pegleg" Sullivan - A wagon driver who is the first person to see the fire.
- William Lee - Neighbor of the O'Learys; attempts to raise the alarm about the fire.
- Bruno Goll - The owner of the drug store where the alarm box is located.
- Mathias Schaffer - A forty-year-old special insurance patrol; he noticed the fire, but dismissed it.
- William Brown - Schaffer's assistant; he refuses to send the fire trucks to box 319.
- Joseph E. Chamberlain - A twenty-year-old reporter for the Chicago Evening Post.
- Chief Marshall Robert Williams - Chief of the fire department.
- Julia Lemo - A resident of Chicago; she saves her children and her parents from the fire.
- Claire Innes - A girl who lost her family in the chaos.
- Alexander Frear - A man from New York, who was visiting his sister-in-law in Chicago at the time of the fire.

== Critical reception ==
Reviewer Erin Whalen described the novel as having "vivid description" that "makes it easy for students to imagine being at the event and to feel what the victims of the fire went through." Other critics described the novel as a book that sparks excitement and interest in the fire that occurred in Chicago. The novel is also described as being adventurous and hard to put down. Critics from the Horn Book described the novel as having "vivid first-hand descriptions by persons who lived through the 1871 Chicago fire are woven into a gripping account and absorbing the riveting reading".

=== Awards ===
- Newbery Medal Honor (1996)
- ALA Best Books for Young Adults (1996)
- Horn Book Fanfare Best Book (1996)
- BCCB Blue Ribbon Book (1995)
- Jefferson Cup (1996).
