= The First Part Last =

2003 young adult novel by Angela Johnson

- Author: Angela Johnson
- Series: Heaven Trilogy
- Published: 2003 (Simon & Schuster Books for Young Readers)
- Publication place: United States
- Pages: 131
- Awards: 2004 Coretta Scott King Author Award; 2004 Michael L. Printz Award
- ISBN: 0-689-84922-2
- OCLC: 50810558
- LC Class: PZ7.J629 Fi 2003
- Preceded by: Heaven(novel)
- Followed by: Sweet, Hereafter(novel)

The First Part Last is a 2003 young adult novel by Angela Johnson and the second book in her Heaven trilogy.

Told in alternating “now” and “then” chapters, the novel follows sixteen-year-old Bobby as he cares for his infant daughter, Feather, after the baby’s mother, Nia, experiences eclampsia during childbirth and falls into a permanent coma.

Critics have noted the novel’s first-person narration style, its fragmented time structure, and its unusual focus on a Black teenage father rather than on adolescent motherhood alone. The novel became one of Johnson’s best-known works and was later singled out by Jonathan Hunt as an unusually successful book across both literary recognition and popular young adult reading lists.

== Background and publication ==
Johnson has said that Bobby’s story began in part when she saw a teenage boy with a baby riding the subway in New York and started wondering about his life.

In a 2004 interview with Booklist, Johnson also explained that returning to Bobby after Heaven was encouraged by her editor Kevin Lewis after young readers responded strongly to the character. Johnson described writing Bobby as a “creative stretch” because it was her first time writing a male main character.

These comments place the novel within both the larger Heaven trilogy and Johnson’s character-driven method of building fiction from observed lives rather than from overt moral instruction.

== Characters ==
- Bobby – Main character and Feather's father
- K-Boy – Bobby's friend
- J.L. – Bobby's friend
- Fred – Bobby's father
- Mary – Bobby's mother
- Paul – Bobby's brother
- Mr. Wilkins – Nia's father
- Mrs. Wilkins – Nia's mother
- Coco Fernandez – Bobby's neighbor
- Nia – Bobby's girl-friend and the mother of Bobby's daughter
- Nick – Paul's kid
- Nora – Paul's kid
- Feather – Bobby's baby/kid

== Themes ==
A major theme in the novel is fatherhood, especially the idea that care, responsibility, and maturity are learned through Bobby’s relationship with Feather. Chelsea Rogers argues that the novel presents Bobby as a young Black father whose emotional growth is shaped not only by parenting, but also by the guidance of his father Fred and his older brother Paul.

Crag Hill similarly reads the book as a challenge to stereotypes about absent Black fathers, arguing that Bobby’s decision to raise Feather counters a common media image of young Black men as irresponsible parents. Taken together, these readings suggest that the novel is not only about teen pregnancy, but also about masculinity, care, and what it means for Bobby to become “a good man.”

== Reception ==
Reviewers generally praised Johnson’s narrative voice and the emotional effect of Bobby’s first-person narration. Writing in the Journal of Adolescent & Adult Literacy, Neal A. Lester argued that the novel’s alternating “now” and “then” structure reinforces its central concern with how past choices shape present realities. A starred Booklist review praised the novel’s sensory detail and described Bobby as developing from a carefree teenager into a more thoughtful and responsible father. Francisca Goldsmith’s review in School Library Journal also emphasized the immediacy of Bobby’s voice and suggested that the audiobook version could work especially well in classroom discussion. Later commentary on Johnson’s career continued to highlight the novel’s wide appeal, with Jonathan Hunt describing it as both highly literary and unusually popular with young adult readers.

== Uses in education ==
In The ALAN Review, Crag Hill argued that The First Part Last works effectively outside the English classroom as well, describing its use in a health class focused on teen pregnancy and parenting. Hill suggests that the novel is especially useful for class discussion because it addresses adolescent decision-making, parenting, and gender expectations through Bobby’s perspective.

== Awards ==
- Coretta Scott King Award, 2004
- Michael L. Printz Award, 2004
