= Weetzie Bat =

Book by Francesca Lia Block

- First edition
- Author: Francesca Lia Block
- Language: English
- Series: Dangerous Angels
- Genre: Young adult novel
- Publisher: HarperCollins
- Publication date: 1989
- Publication place: United States
- Media type: Print (Paperback)
- Pages: 109 pp
- ISBN: 0-06-073625-9
- OCLC: 55874309
- Followed by: Witch Baby

Weetzie Bat is the debut novel of Francesca Lia Block, published by HarperCollins in 1989. It inaugurated her Dangerous Angels series for young adults.

The narrative follows the adventures of the eponymous character Weetzie and her best friend Dirk, as well as their friends and relations. After being granted three wishes by a genie, Weetzie discovers that there are unexpected ramifications.

The story is set in an almost dream-like, heightened version of Los Angeles, aptly referred to as "Shangri-L.A.", in an indefinite time period evoking both the 1980s punk craze and the sophisticated glamor of 1950s Hollywood. Block describes issues such as blended families, premarital sex, homosexuality, and AIDS.

== Characters ==
Weetzie Bat
The central character of the book. Daughter of Brandy-Lynn and Charlie Bat, best friend of Dirk, lover of My Secret-Agent Lover Man, mother of Cherokee. When first seen, she is a skinny, unusual girl with a bleach-blonde flat-top hair cut, a love of Native American culture, and a quirky sense of style. When presented with a magic lamp, she makes three life-altering wishes, none of which turn out as she expects them to.
Dirk
The best friend of Weetzie Bat. Grandson of Fifi, lover of Duck, and possible father to Cherokee. He has blue eyes and, when first introduced, a black mohawk, which later morphs into a ducktail. He drives a 1955 red Pontiac named Jerry, after Jerry Lewis. Like Weetzie, Dirk tends to have poor taste in men.
My Secret-Agent Lover Man
A green-eyed filmmaker who rides a motorcycle. He appears in Weetzie's life after her three wishes.
Duck
A short, blonde, freckly male surfer. Also a possible father to Cherokee.
Slinkster Dog
Weetzie's dog.
Go Go Girl
My Secret-Agent Lover Man buys Go Go Girl as a mate for Slinkster Dog so that Weetzie will stop wishing for children as she can raise the dogs' puppies.
Cherokee
Weetzie's daughter.
Witch Baby
The daughter of My Secret-Agent Lover Man and Vixanne (also known as "the Lanka"). She was originally called Lily, but the name didn't take; everyone just called her by her nickname, Witch Baby.
Grandma Fifi
Dirk's grandmother.
Charlie Bat
Weetzie’s father.
Valentine JahLove, Ping Chong, and Raphael Chong JahLove
Valentine is a tall Rastafarian. Ping Chong is a tiny Chinese woman working as a fashion designer in L.A. (Shangri-L.A.). They have a son named Raphael.

== Reception ==
Weetzie Bat won the 2009 Phoenix Award from the Children's Literature Association as the best English-language children's book that did not win a major award when it was originally published twenty years earlier. It is named for the mythical bird phoenix, which is reborn from its ashes, to suggest the book's rise from obscurity.

Weetzie Bat has attracted controversy, including efforts to challenge or ban the book. For instance, in Texas, an organization critiqued Block's "ideas and views on a variety of issues surrounding alternative lifestyles" according to the B.G. Censorship Watch of American Libraries. Weetzie Bat describes gay marriage, children born out of wedlock, abortion, common-law marriage, and the AIDS epidemic, in language that makes it accessible to the pre-teen and early teen reader.

Critics have countered by arguing that books like Weetzie Bat can provide a vital resource for lesbian, gay, transgender, and HIV-positive teens growing up in what is still largely a homophobic society. Michael Cart states "Francesca Lia Block's Weetzie Bat (HarperCollins) is not only a classic of gay fiction but also one of the most memorable of all young adult novels." Another critic, Rebecca Platzner, noted that while the material is suggestive, the dialogue that it establishes about these depictions is vital to a developing young adult’s perspectives on difficult social issues. Platzer wrote:

"For what age do you think these books are appropriate?" asks our professor. "Thirty two", I whisper to my friend who sits next to me. "Twenty five", she scribbles back on my notebook. We think of these books as "a find" and imagine a time when we will be in a position to pass them on to just-the-right kids. For now though, we'll share them with our friends.

— Rebecca Platzner, Collage in Francesca Lia Block's Weetzie Bat Books, The ALAN Review
