= The Truth About Forever =

2004 novel by Sarah Dessen

- First edition
- Author: Sarah Dessen
- Language: English
- Genre: Young adult
- Publisher: Viking
- Publication date: May 11, 2004
- Publication place: United States
- Media type: Print (hardback & paperback)
- Pages: 374
- ISBN: 0-670-03639-0
- OCLC: 54108904
- LC Class: PZ7.D455 Tr 2004

The Truth About Forever is a novel by Sarah Dessen. It's her sixth novel and was published in hardcover on May 11, 2004, and in paperback on April 6, 2006.

== Plot summary ==
The novel begins with Macy, who is trying to recover from the sudden loss of her father, saying goodbye to her boyfriend, Jason, who is going away to Brain Camp. Since her father died during one of their habitual morning runs, Macy gives up running and keeps all of her feelings to herself. Her overwhelming grief keeps her from moving forward in most aspects of her life. Macy is filling in for Jason at the library, and when she attempts to communicate with him about her unhappiness with her coworkers, he is not supportive. At the end of one of their e-mails, she tells him that she loves him, and he replies saying he thinks it would be for the best if they took a break until he returns in August. Upset and hurt, Macy goes for a ride and sees a van for Wish Catering, which catered to one of her mother's realtor parties. She applies for a job, which she gets. Macy enjoys this new job and her new coworkers. While working for Wish, she meets the artistic Wes, who she later discovers lost his mother to cancer and attended reform school for breaking and entering. During this time Macy's older sister begins to renovate their father's beach house despite reluctance from the other family members (mainly from her mother). Her mother refuses to talk to Macy about the sudden death of her husband, Macy's father; therefore she proceeds to put all of her time into her work.

Macy attends a party with some of her coworkers, where a drunk, former friend from the track team reveals to Macy's friends Wes, Kristy, Bert, and Monica that she had to witness her father's death. Ignoring this information, everybody returns to the party. There, she bonds with coworker Kristy, who advises her to enjoy her life because forever keeps changing. Later Wes and Macy end up stranded together after their catering van runs out of gas, where Macy opens up to Wes about all of the issues in her life during a game of "Truth". They continue to play the game later during work, where Macy discovers that he is also in an "on a break" relationship with a girl named Becky.

As Macy and Wes grow closer together, Macy's mother advises against the job and any possible relationship with Wes after Macy misses one of her mother's parties due to the birth of Avery, Delia's daughter. Macy later ends up deciding to confess to Wes that she cares about him, but sees him with Becky (Wes's girlfriend) and ends up heartbroken again. Her mother has Macy helping her with preparations for a party but eventually has to have Wish Catering assist her. It is during this time that Macy succeeds in being able to comfort her mother. Macy realizes that there's more to life than just sticking to the rules and trying to please everyone around her. She realizes that she's the only one in control of her future. Macy gets together with Wes.

== Reception ==
Critical reception to The Truth About Forever has been positive, with The Celebrity Cafe giving the book 4.5 stars and the Star Telegram calling it "eternally inspiring". Publishers Weekly and Teen Ink also praised the book, with Teen Ink writing that it was a "must read" for summer reading lists. The Otago Daily Times stated that although not all of the characters were as fully developed as the main characters, they enjoyed the book overall. Kirkus Reviews criticized the plot as "too conventional" but wrote that "the Wish team is lovable, the romance clicks, and readers will be entertained". Of the audiobook, AudioFile Magazine cited narrator Stina Nielsen's "appealing tone and cadence" as a highlight.

== Adaptions ==
It was adapted as a audiobook in 2006 adaptation, which was one of the Young Adult Library Services Association's selected picks for that year.

In June 2021, it was announced that the novel was added to the Dessen books obtained by Netflix to be adapted into a feature film.

== Allusions to other books ==
- The character of Jason reappears in the books Along for the Ride and What Happened to Goodbye.
- Stella, the woman who owns the garden and gives Macy directions to Delia's home, is seen reading a novel by Barbara Starr, Remy's mother in This Lullaby.
- When Macy turns on the weather channel she mentions that Lorna McPhail was delivering the daily forecast. Lorna McPhail is Haven's stepmother from That Summer.
- Wes is mentioned in Along for the Ride by Jason; being referred to as "the juvenile delinquent welder with a tattoo".
- Kristy and Bert wearing an "Armegeddon Expo '06" T-shirt are mentioned in Lock and Key at the mall where Ruby works.
- Macy and Wes are seen eating waffles together in Just Listen. They are described, "On our other side there was a couple about our age eating waffles, both in running clothes: The girl had blonde hair and an elastic around her wrist, while the guy was taller and darker, the bottom part of a tattoo just visible under his shirtsleeve."
- Wes and Burt are mentioned as cousins with Luke, Emaline's boyfriend in The Moon and More.
- Macy's dad mentions a place called Last Chance, which is a cafe mentioned in Along for the Ride and one setting in Keeping the Moon.
- The neighborhood Wildflower Ridge that Macy's parents were building is the neighborhood where Nate and Ruby from Lock and Key lived in.
- Evergreen, the rehab mentioned, is the same one from Dreamland.
