= Keeping the Moon =

1999 novel by Sarah Dessen

- First edition
- Author: Sarah Dessen
- Cover artist: Linda McCarthy
- Language: English
- Genre: Young adult novel
- Publisher: Viking Press
- Publication date: September 1, 1999
- Publication place: United States
- Media type: Print (Hardback & Paperback)
- Pages: 228
- ISBN: 978-0-67-088549-7
- OCLC: 55498486

Keeping the Moon is a young adult novel by author Sarah Dessen. It is her third novel and was first published in 1999.

== Plot summary ==
While her mother, a famous television fitness coach, is on promotion tour in Europe, fifteen-year-old Colie has to spend the summer holidays with her aunt Mira in Colby, North Carolina. Having endured a tough time at school, Colie is not looking forward to Colby. In her hometown Charlotte, Colie is an outsider as she used to be very overweight and, after losing weight, mean rumors about her being easy to get were spread.

After Colie arrives at the train station in Colby, she is picked up by Norman, Mira's subtenant. Soon after her arrival Colie gets to know Morgan and Isabel who serve as waitresses in the Last Chance Diner where Norman is working as cook. At first, Colie is very dismissive but later regularly helps out in the restaurant. Over time, her initial defensiveness vanishes and they become friends. Also, she enjoys staying with her eccentric but warm-hearted aunt. In the course of a painting project, she and Norman get closer. During the festivities for the Fourth of July, Colie encounters the girl which spread the rumors at her school. She is able to stand up to her and gets the number of her handsome cousin.

In the end, Colie falls in love with Norman and while watching the eclipse of the moon they try to help Morgan to get over the break-up from her long-time boyfriend.

== Characters ==
- Nicole "Colie" Sparks – The protagonist of the novel, a 15-year-old girl. When her mother became a famous exercise guru, she shed her weight but not her insecurity. Most of the kids at her school back home alienate her because Caroline Dawes and her friends spread a vicious rumor about her hooking up with Chase Mercer, the new guy at school, on a golf course. Her mom ships her off to her aunt's house in Colby, North Carolina for the summer, and the relationships and connections that she makes there help her realize that she is actually worth something, and help her gain self-confidence.
- Mira Sparks – Colie's aunt. She is overweight and very kind. She makes cards that are for people that have lost their loved ones. She buys a lot of sugared cereal and enjoys eating the grilled chicken salad at Last Chance. Mira is also friends with Morgan and Isabel. She lives with Norman and Colie and has a cat named Cat Norman (named after Norman).
- Morgan – Works at Last Chance with Isabel, Colie, and Norman. She has noted many times that she is engaged with a baseball player named Mark. Unfortunately, Morgan's fiancé cheated on her with a stripper whom Mark was married to and is expecting a child with. Morgan is very organized and straightforward about things. She has been friends with Isabel since high school and they are very close. She is said to be very tall, skinny, and has short dark brown hair.
- Isabel – Works at Last Chance with Morgan, Colie, and Norman. It is stated that a lot of boys flirt and hit on her. Isabel is very lazy and reads Vogue in her free time. She is best friends and roommates with Morgan. Isabel acts grumpy around Colie and is very judgmental. Colie sees a picture of a rather ugly girl in a green sweater and a frog necklace on Isabel's mirror. When she asks who it is, Isabel quickly says it is her cousin. Later on, Colie discovers that the ugly girl was really Isabel, proving that she and Isabel have something in common. Isabel has long, blonde hair and blue eyes.
- Norman – An "art freak". His father does not support the idea of him being an artist, so this resulted in fights. Norman moved out of the house when he was 17. He works with Morgan, Isabel, and Colie at Last Chance as a cook. He has a small crush on Colie and collects sunglasses. He has a whole series of paintings that feature the models wearing sunglasses. Norman is shy and kind. He has long brown hair that reaches his shoulder and deep brown eyes. He lives with Mira and Colie because he has nowhere to go. Towards the end, he makes a painting of Colie for his series and becomes Colie's boyfriend.
- Kiki Sparks – Formerly Katharine Sparks. A famous exercise guru, Colie's mother. She and Colie shared a period of their lives which they called the "Fat Years", and during that time, she had to have the strength for the both of them. Throughout the story, she sometimes gets so caught up in her work, that she forgets that Colie is her daughter.
- Caroline Dawes – A snobby girl from Colie's school, described as Colie's worst enemy. She teased Colie when she was fat, and once she lost the weight, she spread rumors about her being a slut and kept them circulating throughout the school. She is said to be tall, tan, and skinny with long black hair that she frequently swings around.
- Josh – The cousin of Caroline Dawes, meets Colie at a fireworks show in Colby.

== Major themes ==
Publishers Weekly claimed that Colie "[learns] some pretty important lessons about friendship and learning to love herself". Likewise, TheCelebrityCafe.com picked up on the theme of self-acceptance, writing that the novel deals with "teenage issues" that Colie has to overcome. Reviewers saw Keeping The Moon as a "kind of Cinderella story" in which Colie undergoes "a happy metamorphosis".

== Reception ==
Publishers weekly described the dialogue as "snappy" and complimented the "colorful episodes" throughout the novel. They also praised the "unexpected pearls of wisdom". Booklist, however, stated that "it's unfortunate this novel doesn't have something more original to say about the perpetually vexing problem of teen body image", and complained that it was "predictable". The Kirkus Review noted that the book was a "life-altering experience" and TheCelebrityCafe.com complimented the book's "entertaining yet touching portrait".

== Style ==
Sarah Dessen is "an absolutely wonderful writer—stylish, smart, and funny" claims Michael Cart. Publishers Weekly also noted that Dessen's "ironic sense of humor and her knack for creating characters with quirky personalities and universal emotions set[s] her book apart [from others]".

== Allusions to other books ==
- Colie is later mentioned in Along for the Ride as the pretty, dark-haired, girl with a lip ring who Auden gives her order to. She also waits on Emaline in The Moon and More.
- Colie is mentioned in The Moon and More as the waitress with dark hair and protractor tattoo who took Emeline and Luke's order.
- Colby is where Along for the Ride and The Moon and More take place. Also mentioned in The Truth About Forever, Once and For All and What Happened to Goodbye
- Isabel is mentioned in What Happened To Goodbye as the waitress at the Last Chance Diner.
- Isabel and Morgan appear in Along for the Ride as Heidi's friends.
- Lacey, Olivia's cousin from Lock and Key was inspired to run for a marathon because of Kiki Sparks, Colie's mother.
