= Along for the Ride =

Along for the Ride may refer to:

- Along for the Ride (novel), a 2009 novel by the American author Sarah Dessen
  - Along for the Ride (film), a 2022 film adaptation of the novel
- "Along for the Ride" (song), a song by the American progressive metal band Dream Theater
  - Along for the Ride (tour), a world tour by the same band
- Along for the Ride (2000 film), by Bryan W. Simon
- Along for the Ride, a 2001 studio album by John Mayall
- Along for the Ride, a 2016 documentary about Dennis Hopper
