= This Lullaby =

2002 novel by Sarah Dessen

- First edition
- Author: Sarah Dessen
- Language: English
- Published: May 27, 2002
- Publisher: Viking Books
- Publication place: United States
- ISBN: 978-0-670-03530-4

This Lullaby (2002) is a young adult novel written by Sarah Dessen.

== Plot summary ==
Remy is an eighteen-year-old who is about to leave for college. Her father, a musician, wrote his one and only hit song the day she was born. The song, called "This Lullaby," became extremely popular, but he died soon after its release. Now, Remy's mother is getting married for the fifth time. After her mother's previous failed marriages, love is something that Remy doesn't believe exists.

One day, she randomly meets Dexter at a car dealership that her mother's fiancé owns. He claims to feel a connection with her the second he saw her. He is messy and a musician, two of her least favorite traits. But he is persistent. She slowly finds herself falling for him. She doesn't want to care about him, but somehow she just can't bring herself to get rid of him. Eventually, they start dating and she is surprised by how open and honest and caring he is. When Dexter overhears Remy saying that she only wants him to be a summer fling, they break up. Remy begins to date another guy, but she finds herself always thinking about Dexter. Meanwhile, her brother is getting engaged, her mother's new husband is cheating with his secretary, and her friends are all having problems of their own. But in the end, Remy realizes that she truly does love Dexter, and they get back together. Remy still leaves for college but in Just Listen it is revealed that Remy and Dexter are together because Remy is shown with Dexter while Remy is on fall break from college.

== "This Lullaby" lyrics ==
This lullaby is only a few words
A simple run of chords
Quiet here in this spare room
But you can hear it, hear it
Wherever you may go
I will let you down
But this lullaby plays on...

Note: When Truth Squad does a cover of "This Lullaby", Dexter sings the 6th line as "Even if I let you down" instead.

== Characters ==
- Remy Starr – Remy is the protagonist of This Lullaby and is cool, calm, and cynical. After seeing her mother's failed marriages, she proclaims that she doesn't believe in love. She believes that she has the upper hand in all of her relationships. She is also obsessive about cleanliness and does not allow anyone to eat or smoke in her car. Remy is named after an expensive brand of cognac that her mother saw in Harper's Bazaar. She is emotionally scarred by her past, as her father – whom she never knew – wrote her the song "This Lullaby" the day she was born, and then left soon after. The song becomes a one-hit wonder, and Remy constantly hears it in her life. She claims to have relationships all figured out, in logical, mathematical terms. She used to be known for sleeping around and partying.
- Dexter Jones – Dexter is the lead singer of a band called Truth Squad (also known by their wedding persona, the G-Flats). Gangly and sociable, he bumps (literally) into Remy at her stepfather-to-be's car dealership, claiming to have sensed a special bond with her. It is later revealed he dropped out of college for music, "breaking his mother's heart", as Remy's stepfather Don says at the Fourth of July barbecue. Don's sister is Dexter's aunt, but Don is not Dexter's uncle. Dexter's dog is named Monkey because he wanted a monkey when he was ten, but got a dog instead. He is carefree, kindhearted, and funny; he loves to throw down ridiculous challenges at every given opportunity, as shown when he dares John Miller to eat ten bananas (later changed to 9 and a half due to Remy's judging abilities), and also when he dares Chloe to stand on her head for 20 minutes. During the novel, he works at a one-hour photo place where he saves funny pictures. One of these photos is evidence of Remy's stepfather's affair, and Remy mistakenly believes Dexter shows it to her on purpose to hurt her. Also, Dexter hates English muffins.
- Barbara Starr – Barbara is Remy's mother, who also happens to be a famous author. Her books are the romantic type, all about exotic locations and women who have everything yet nothing. Her latest book is 'The Choice'. She has been married numerous times, each time changing her outward personality to match her newest husband, yet still believes in love despite her failed relationships, in direct contrast to Remy's view on love.
- Christopher Starr – Chris is Remy's brother. He used to be a juvenile delinquent, before he met his girlfriend, Jennifer Anne, whom he met at his job at Jiffy Lube. Since then, he's shaped up considerably. He breeds lizards in his room. He is named after his mother's favorite saint and he is very close to Remy because of their shared childhood. Towards the end of the book, he and Jennifer Anne state that they are engaged to get married.
- Jennifer Anne Baker – Jennifer Anne is Chris's girlfriend, who is described as being small with big blond hair, and whip smart. She is seen as an uptight, annoying perfectionist in Remy's eyes only, and is the only one who refers to Chris as "Christopher". Later in the book, she and Chris become engaged. Remy often cannot tolerate Jennifer Anne; however, she means well. Jennifer Anne reads many self-help books and greatly dislikes Chris's obsession with his lizards.
- Don Davis – Don is Barbara's fifth husband. They met at the car dealership when Barb and Remy went to buy a new car. A lifelong bachelor, he has habits that annoy both Chris and Remy: his paintings and statues, which often seem to have sexual or violent themes, and his pyramids of Ensure cans. After his marriage with Barbara, he is caught having an affair with his secretary, Patty....
- Jess – Jess is Remy's oldest friend. She is generally very emotionless, and clashes a lot with Chloe. Remy describes her as "big," but not fat. She is the "mother" of their group of friends because she's been raising her two younger brothers since her mom died in fifth grade. She disagrees and fights with Chloe often. She is also the most responsible of the group; she doesn't drink or smoke, always drives. Jess avoids dating problems by not dating at all for the most part. She is somewhat Chloe's polar opposite.
- Lissa – Lissa is Remy's friend, the "emotion" of the bunch. Unlike Chloe and Remy, she believes in true love. She plans to attend the local university to be together with her boyfriend, Adam, whom she gave her virginity to. However, when Adam abruptly breaks up with her, she is miserable. She becomes more upset when she sees Adam with another girl. She has an "infamous" sweet tooth – Remy considers her the only person she knows who can thoroughly explain the difference between chocolate-covered raisins and Raisinettes. She also thinks that all of Remy's boyfriends and exes are nice and are keepers. Not that Remy cares, because, as she tells Lissa, "You like everybody."
- Chloe – Chloe is one of Remy's friends. She shares Remy's skeptical views on love. Her mother is an airline stewardess, and often brings home small mini-bottles of liquor that the girls steal and drink. Her mom is also a compulsive shopper, so Chloe is often seen in new clothes and is referred to as "our little trendsetter". Chloe doesn't understand Remy's attraction to Dexter, and is often insensitive. Jess and Chloe often argue over mundane things.
- John Miller – When John Miller first appears, he is referred to as Ringo, as in Ringo Starr, by Lola, Remy's boss. John Miller is the redheaded drummer of Truth Squad, and possibly the one who makes the most appearances (following Dexter). He is "madly in love" with Scarlett, one of the main characters in Someone Like You. Scarlett later finds him "immature" and "not husband material" as John Miller points out while he is drunk at the Quick Zip.
- Ted – Ted is the guitarist for Truth Squad. Unlike the others, he is uptight about everything and feels very deeply about how their music is accepted and understood. He does not like doing covers, as this reminds him of their G-Flats wedding persona. So he helps to write "The Potato Song", a song which he feels strongly about. During the novel, he works at a grocery store where he often brings home bruised but edible fruit, like crates of tangerines. In Just Listen, he and Owen are good friends.
- Lucas – Lucas is the keyboardist for Truth Squad. He has "been in several bands", including a hair metal band. He has a tendency to be an "eggbert". He and Dexter both work at Flash Camera, and Lucas is the technician there.
- Paul – After Remy and Dexter break up, Remy agrees to go on a blind date with Paul, who she immediately christens "Perfect Paul". Lola often raves about his perfect hands and the fact that he is bilingual. One of his favorite bands is Spinnerbait, a band Truth Squad considers talentless frat boys.
- Patty – Patty is Don's secretary. She has an affair with Don. She ran off with another guy who we later know was her husband. In the novel she gets a divorce with her husband to be with Don. She later sends a picture of herself in lingerie to Barbara, which was taken in Don and Barbara's bedroom, when Barbara was in Florida.
- Scarlett Thomas – The manager of Jump Java and also Remy's brother's ex-girlfriend. John Miller had a crush on her. She is a character in Someone Like You.

== Allusions to other books ==
- Scarlett, who is the manager of Jump Java, was Michael Sherwood's girlfriend and Halley's best friend in Someone Like You.
- In Just Listen, Annabel meets Remy and Dexter while she goes backstage when she goes to Bendo to watch Truth Squad.
- When Owen first drives Annabel home in Just Listen, there are Truth Squad CDs in the back of his car.
- In The Truth About Forever, Macy notices that Stella, the woman who gives her the directions to Delia's house, is reading a book by Barbara Starr. Barbara Starr is Remy's mother.
- In Lock and Key, Ruby is introduced to Barbara Starr during the holidays. Her sister Cora was her divorce lawyer.
- In The Moon and More, Spinnerbait is playing a gig while Emaline is on a date with Theo.
- In Saint Anything, Spinnerbait and Truth Squad are mentioned by Eric.
- In "Once and For All, Spinnerbait is mentioned.
- In "The Rest of the Story, Spinnerbait is mentioned.

== Film adaptation ==
In May 2019, it was announced that the novel was one of three books by Dessen picked up by Netflix to become a feature film.

Despite Netflix's pick-up of the novel in 2019, they declined to move forward with an adaptation. As of July 2023 a script and director are still attached to the book.

== Awards and nominations ==
- PW Best Book of The Year
- Los Angeles Times Book Prize finalist
- South Carolina Book Award Nominee for Young Adult Book Award (2005)
- Michigan Library Association Thumbs Up! Award Nominee (2003)
- Missouri Gateway Readers Award Nominee (2005)
