= Along for the Ride (novel) =

2009 novel by American author Sarah Dessen

- First edition
- Author: Sarah Dessen
- Original title: Along for the ride
- Language: English
- Genre: Young adult
- Publisher: Viking Children’s Books
- Publication date: June 16, 2009
- Publication place: United States
- Media type: Print (hardback & paperback)
- Pages: 383pp

Along for the Ride is a novel by Sarah Dessen. It was released on June 16, 2009. The novel focuses on Auden West, who never sleeps at night due to her parents' continuous fighting when she was in high school. Before heading off to college, Auden decides to spend her summer before college with her father, his wife and their new baby. Although Auden is at first reluctant, she comes to really like her stepmother and half-sister. Auden also ends up spending her nights making up for her lost childhood with Eli, a loner and insomniac with an intriguing past. She learns that second chances are possible and questions if people can truly change.

== Plot summary ==
Auden West is an academically accomplished girl who didn't get the chance to enjoy the activities young children often got to do (such as riding a bike) when she was a child. After being accepted into Defriese University upon graduating high school, Auden is not sure on how to spend her summer. After receiving a package from her brother Hollis who is touring Europe, she decides to take up her father's offer to spend her summer before college in the beach town Colby. When she arrives, she hopes she can have some bonding time with her father. However, she is disappointed to find that that will not be the case since her father spends all his time working on his novel. One night Auden heads down to the Tip, a stretch of beach where all the teens hang out. At the Tip she runs into a guy named Jake, with whom she almost ends up having a one-night stand with. Feeling guilty and wrong about what she was doing, Auden leaves for home. Early in the morning, she helps out her young stepmother Heidi by supervising her newborn half-sister, Thisbe, while Heidi rests. Auden also helps Heidi run an errand for Heidi's boutique named Clementine's.

There she meets one of Heidi's employees, Maggie. Maggie's friends Leah and Esther walk into the store and reveal to Maggie that her ex-boyfriend Jake (who she is still in love with) hooked up with a girl the previous night, though they don't know that it was Auden yet. Once they figure out who he hooked up with, Auden ends up briefly explaining to Maggie that she has no relationship with Jake whatsoever. The next day Auden's family decides to head down to the Last Chance diner for dinner. It is clear that Auden's father is irritated since he does not want to leave the house so he can finish his book. Heidi has to go to her boutique on the way to dinner due to a business error, which irritates Auden's father even more. While waiting for Heidi at the diner, Auden is prompted by her father to take care of Thisbe outside. A young man called Eli helps her out by calming down Thisbe.

At that moment, Heidi appears and thanks Eli, who leaves. She informs Auden that Eli runs the bike shop next to her boutique. She also mentions that Eli has a little brother around Auden's age named Jake. Auden quickly realizes that Eli's little brother Jake is the same Jake she fooled around with. At dinner a dispute rises between Heidi and Auden's father which they leave unresolved. Realizing their fight is not over, Auden does not go home until two hours later. However, Auden arrives at the peak of the fight. Auden stays on the porch and overhears her father say that the only reason he invited Auden was so she can help out with Thisbe. She also overhears Heidi standing up for her and telling her father that he should spend more time with both his daughters. Auden leaves for another three hours and is unsure whether to feel grateful or not for Heidi defending her. Later that night after everyone was asleep, Auden spends the night fixing Heidi's finances. Grateful, Heidi offers Auden a job working on the store's books. After a remark from Auden's father, Auden accepts the job, much to her father's disappointment.

While Auden works she's treated kindly by the other girls. After a few day, Auden's professor mother comes down to visit. She is highly critical of Heidi and the store for the stereotype of women it projects. Auden's mother notices that her daughter has changed and once Auden defends Heidi. The employees at Heidi's boutique encourage Auden to go to a party with them and there she has an encounter with Eli. They keep bumping into each other, and eventually find out that both of them have nocturnal habits. They start hanging out with each other when night time comes. They do things that Auden hasn't really done before, such as bowling. They start getting closer and eventually kiss for the first time at a bar. Auden asks Maggie if she can teach her how to ride a bike. Maggie agrees to help.

Jason, Auden's ex-prom date comes around. Auden breaks the friendship between her and Eli because she feels uncomfortable with how different she is becoming. Jason asks Auden to go with him to the Beach Bash, an event Heidi had planned for the end of the summer. Auden accepts. When the Beach Bash comes, Jason turns Auden down again. Auden asks Eli to go with her, but he rejects her and it takes a toll on Auden. However, when Eli and Auden meet again, they talk things out and decide to go to the Beach Bash together and have a great time. At the end of the book, Auden has started university and is at Ray's, a diner she used to regularly visit when she had insomnia, with Eli. They end the novel being a couple again.

== Characters ==
=== Major ===
- Auden Penelope West: Auden is the main character of Along for the Ride. She is a quiet and smart girl who lived with her mother after her parents' divorce, devoting herself to schoolwork in an attempt to please her perfectionist of a mother. Academia is like her "old friend" and she relies on it as her place to keep calm. Along the way, she realizes she lost most of her childhood because her parents treated her as an adult since she was young and she never bothered to participate in any of the important milestones of becoming a teenager. Auden decides to spend her last summer before college in the beach town of Colby where her father, stepmother and new baby sister live. Breaking free from the constraints of her parents' impossibly high expectations, Auden begins to live her own life, and discovers things about herself she never knew. Throughout the novel, she experiences many normal high school experiences she missed out on growing up. As she opens up to others and learns that yes, people can change, the world becomes a much more inviting place, with more things to offer than just textbooks to hide behind.
- Eli Joseph Stock: Eli is a native of Colby who is an insomniac, like Auden. He and his best friend since grade school, Abe, rode bikes together in competitions until Abe died in a car accident where Eli was driving. Since the accident, Eli has kept to himself and seemingly stopped riding his bike until Auden finds him one lonely night, and they teach each other to grow and love again.
- Dr. Victoria West: Auden's mother is a "Mensa level" scholar who has treated her daughter like an adult since she was a child. She doesn't particularly agree with Auden's decision to spend the summer with her father, but once she realizes that the trip has transformed Auden into a better person, she learns to embrace her life and appreciate her daughter.
- Maggie: Maggie is another native of Colby who works at Clementine's, Auden's stepmother, Heidi's boutique. She dated Eli's brother, Jake, for most of high school, and they were in a rough patch when Auden came to town and hooked up with Jake on her first night in Colby. Maggie finds out that Auden and Jake had sex behind the sand dunes at The Tip, but she decides it is for the best and the two become friends. Maggie teaches Auden how to ride a bike, and the two are both very bright students and end up becoming roommates at Defriese University.
- Adam: Adam is another native of Colby who works at the Bike shop, later called "Abe's Bikes". He is in love with Maggie, which everyone knows but Maggie. He helps teach Auden how to ride a bike. He was the only person on the staff of his high-schools yearbook, causing all other native to Colby not let him take a picture. Adam ends up dating Maggie at the end of the book.
- Robert West: Robert is Auden's father. He is a professor at a college and divorced Auden's mother after she became more successful than him. He marries Heidi West and has Thisbe. He is described as selfish and never helps with Thisbe. He and Heidi fight and he moves out, but in the end, appears to want to turn a new leaf. Auden states that he moves back in at the end of the book.
- Heidi West: Auden's upbeat 26-year-old stepmother who has been married to Robert West for about a year. Auden initially can't stand Heidi's enthusiasm and love for pink but later learns that she was wrong about her. She owns a boutique, Clementine's, which is next to the bike shop where Eli works. A self-proclaimed former "cold bitch", she dreamed of opening a store in New York City before she moved to Colby one summer to take care of her sick mother and met Auden's father.

=== Minor ===
- Jake Stock: Jake is a playboy, he dated Maggie, but had a relation with Auden behind the sand dunes and he is Eli's younger brother.
- Belissa Norwood Eli's jealous ex-girlfriend, who got mad at Auden for trying to steal her boyfriend, because Auden was talking with Eli. Though in reality, she and Eli were just talking, and Belissa was oblivious to the actual conversation, accusing Auden falsely.
- Hollis West: Auden's free-spirited, happy-go-lucky older brother who has been backpacking abroad in Europe for a couple years prior to the beginning of the story. He later returns home after having met and fallen in love with Laura, a scientist at "The U", whom Heidi noticed strongly resembled Auden's mother, and begins a steady job at a bank. He explains to Auden that all children are kids with their parents, unless the parents are too childish themselves - one of the reasons he'd left home.
- Thisbe Caroline "Isby" West: The newborn daughter of Heidi and Robert, Auden and Hollis's father. She was extremely fussy until Heidi had a breakdown, prompting Auden to call Eli, who brought his mother Karen Stock, who raised four children and has four grandchildren, to help Heidi and give advice for caring for Isby.
- Leah: Leah is another native Colby. She is best friends with Esther and Maggie. Clementine's is where she works. Leah is outgoing and a ready to face the world girl. Throughout the story, the girls are always looking for things to after work. She always wants to go to the local dance club (Tallyho).
- Esther: Esther is yet another native Colby, that works at Clementine's and is best friends with Leah and Maggie. She, however, is more reserved. She's always the one to say "No, no, no to tallyho."
- Karen Stock: Karen is a kind and caring retired maternity ward nurse who helps Heidi during her nervous breakdown and helps care for Thisbe afterwards.
- Clyde: The owner of the bike store that many of the characters work at, he also owns and operates many other companies in Colby. His laundromat and pie shop is where Auden and Eli often start their night adventures.
- Wallace:

== Allusions to other books ==
- Auden mentions going to both Jackson High for two weeks which is Caitlin's school in Dreamland, Macy's school in The Truth About Forever, Annabel's school in Just Listen, Mclean's in What Happened to Goodbye, and Sydney's in Saint Anything
- Auden goes to Perkins Day for a little bit which is where Rogerson, Caitlin's boyfriend, goes to school in Dreamland, the school Will Cash goes to in Just Listen, and where Ruby and Nate go to in Lock and Key And Sydney's school at the beginning of Saint Anything.
- Auden ends up going to Defriese University which Ruby applies to in Lock and Key and the basketball team McLean and her dad loved in What Happened to Goodbye.
- Auden mentions at one point awkwardly flirting with Nate Cross, who was Ruby's neighbor, and later boyfriend in Lock and Key, when she attended Perkins Day.
- Auden has a Ume.com page which is the social media website that was created by Jamie from Lock and Key.
- Auden lives with her mother in the same town that Ruby moved to in Lock and Key, where McLean later moves to in What Happened to Goodbye and where Annabel and Owen live in Just Listen and Sydney in Saint Anything
- "The U" is a college mentioned in this book and in Lock and Key.
- Jason who was Macy's boyfriend in The Truth About Forever
- Wes from The Truth About Forever is referenced by Jason as a "delinquent welder with a tattoo".
- Heidi's best friends are Morgan and Isabel from Keeping the Moon.
- Heidi and Auden get necklaces with a studded key at the store. These are the necklaces from Lock and Key.
- Auden goes to the Last Chance Cafe and gives her order to a pretty, dark-haired girl, with a lip ring who is most likely Colie Sparks from Keeping the Moon.
- Heidi and Auden briefly talk to Daisy and Emaline in Heidi's boutique in Colby in “The Moon and More”
- In "Once and For All" when Louna and Ethan went to a pie shop, they saw Auden and Eli
- Esther appears in The Moon and More as a film student.

== Film adaptation ==
In May 2019, it was announced that the novel, was one of three Dessen books that were picked up by Netflix to adapt into a feature film. On April 22, 2021, Netflix announced Sofia Alvarez would be adapting & directing the film.
