= Someone like You (novel) =

1998 young adult novel by Sarah Dessen

Someone Like You
- Author: Sarah Dessen
- Cover artist: Cover photo: Getty Images; Cover design: Linda McCarthy
- Language: English
- Genre: Young adult
- Publisher: Julia MacRae Books
- Publication date: May 1, 1998
- Publication place: United States
- Media type: Print (hardback and paperback)
- Pages: 281pp
- ISBN: 978-0-14-240177-4
- OCLC: 55498517

Someone Like You (1998) is a young adult novel by Sarah Dessen. The movie How to Deal was based on this novel as well as one of Dessen's other novels, That Summer.

== Plot summary ==
The book is split into three parts.

=== Part I: The Grand Canyon ===
Halley and Scarlett Thomas live in directly opposite houses and both had jobs at Milton's Market.

At the beginning of the summer, Scarlett starts dating Michael Sherwood but they decide to keep it quiet, with only Halley really knowing, because Michael recently broke up with cheerleader Elizabeth Gunderson and he claims he didn't want her to get upset.

For the last two weeks of summer vacation, Halley is sent away to Sisterhood Camp against her will by her mother, who is having difficulties coming to terms with Halley growing up and changing. Then disaster strikes and Halley gets a phone call from Scarlett telling her about Michael's death. Scarlett asks Halley to come home and be with her.

Her mom, even though she is unhappy about this, brings her home.

On the day of the funeral, it is clear that no one knew about Scarlett and Michael, and Elizabeth Gunderson seems to be taking it very hard. On the ride home, it is raining heavily and as they are driving along they see Macon Faulkner, Michael's best friend, walking and they offer him a lift which he declines as he is clearly upset.

Going back to school on the first day, Scarlett states she feels ill. Halley goes to class and finds her new schedule is wrong so she goes to the guidance counselor's office to sort it out. There she gets talking to Macon who jokes around with her and teaches her the "Jedi Mind Trick" (using one's mind to move things). Halley is a bit surprised by his sudden friendliness. Later that day, she finds out they have P.E. together. She develops a crush on him as he fascinates her with his unpredictable and wild lifestyle.

Macon mentions a party, casually asking her out and she says "yes". She and Scarlett later go to the party, where Macon doesn't show up. When the party host, Ginny Tabor, throws everyone out, they go back to sit on Scarlett's porch and Halley talks about how she doesn't deserve him. He later turns up at her window and tells her he did go to the party but he was in the attic so it was all a misunderstanding. He kisses her. Halley's nerdy ex-boyfriend, Noah Vaughn, is watching from the kitchen window.

While she is doing her chore of mowing the lawn, Macon turns up with a giant mower to help which pleases her father but makes her mother angry as it is supposed to be her job to mow the lawn. Her mother becomes very nosy and keeps bugging Halley about who he is.

=== Part II: Someone Like You ===
Halley and Scarlett are working when Scarlett pulls Halley into the bathroom and tells her that she is pregnant.

They tell Scarlett's mother, who books an abortion appointment. On the day of the abortion, Scarlett decides against it and calls Halley to pick her up from the clinic. Halley asks Macon to drive her there and he does. When they have picked up Scarlett, Halley's mother sees them and assumes they are just cutting class. She tells Scarlett's mother, who then enlists Halley's mother's help to sort a compromise. Halley is then grounded.

Halley has a birthday dinner the next day with her family, the Vaughn family, and Scarlett. Later, she sneaks out with Macon. He takes her to the quarry where they passionately make out, leaving Halley feeling as though the girl she used to be has left her and she has been replaced by someone new.

The next chapters are focused on the changes that happen throughout Scarlett's pregnancy and the pressures of Halley's relationship with Macon, who is constantly asking her to have sex with him. Although she thinks about it a lot she isn't ready and they start to become distant, which isn't helped by his secretive lifestyle. Elizabeth Gunderson drops hints about him cheating on her. Her mother is forever asking her about Macon and she dislikes him despite never having met him. Halley is forbidden from seeing Macon. Everyone at school finds out about the pregnancy because Ginny, who can't keep secrets, overhears them talking in the bathroom.

When Halley decides to have sex with Macon at a New Year's Eve party, Scarlett tries to convince her not to, and they get into a major argument that leaves them not speaking. Halley gets drunk before she can do it. When she throws up and leaves, Macon is furious because he thinks she has been just leading him on. While he is driving her home, he is too busy shouting at her to watch the road and they get into a major car accident. Before going into the emergency room, Macon holds Halley's hand tightly and says, "I love you." Halley is seriously injured. Macon doesn't visit. Her mother is disappointed in her because she does not know the truth about what really happened.

=== Part III: Grace ===
After Halley gets out of the hospital, Macon comes to see her at her window. Halley having had enough breaks up with him which breaks his heart because he then realizes he's in love with her. Her mother comes down and starts to shout at her for seeing Macon. Halley explains what has just happened. She also tells her mother how she feels about all the restrictions she has put on her and they come to an understanding: both of them will try harder to get on.

Next is prom with Elizabeth now dating Macon. Halley goes to prom with the family-friend and former boyfriend Noah. Noah gets drunk and rips Halley's prom dress. She gets angry and is forced into the bathroom where she bumps into Elizabeth. Elizabeth tells her that Macon still loves her but they are interrupted by the announcement that Scarlett is in labor.

Halley, Scarlett, Scarlett's other friend, Cameron try to leave but the only transport to the hospital is Macon's car. Macon and his now girlfriend Elizabeth (who appear to be in a fight) take them to the hospital. Halley calls her mother, who comes down and helps her through the labor.

After the birth, Scarlett names the baby Grace Halley Thomas and everyone turns up in the waiting room. The school prom-goers and all Scarlett's mother's friends all come together in happiness for the birth. After everything has calmed down and everyone has gone home, Halley starts to walk home alone, but she is happy, thinking about Grace Halley's life ahead and what she could offer her in life.

== Allusions to other works ==
- Scarlett reappears in This Lullaby as the manager of Jump Java.
- Macy goes to Milton's Market with Wes in The Truth About Forever.
