= Once and for All =

Once and for All may refer to:

- Once and for All (album), a 1994 album by Loudness
- Once and for All (Ninjago), an episode of Ninjago
- Once and for All (novel), a 2017 novel by Sarah Dessen
- Once And For All (song), a song in the 1992 musical film Newsies
