= Kristina Forest =

American romance novelist

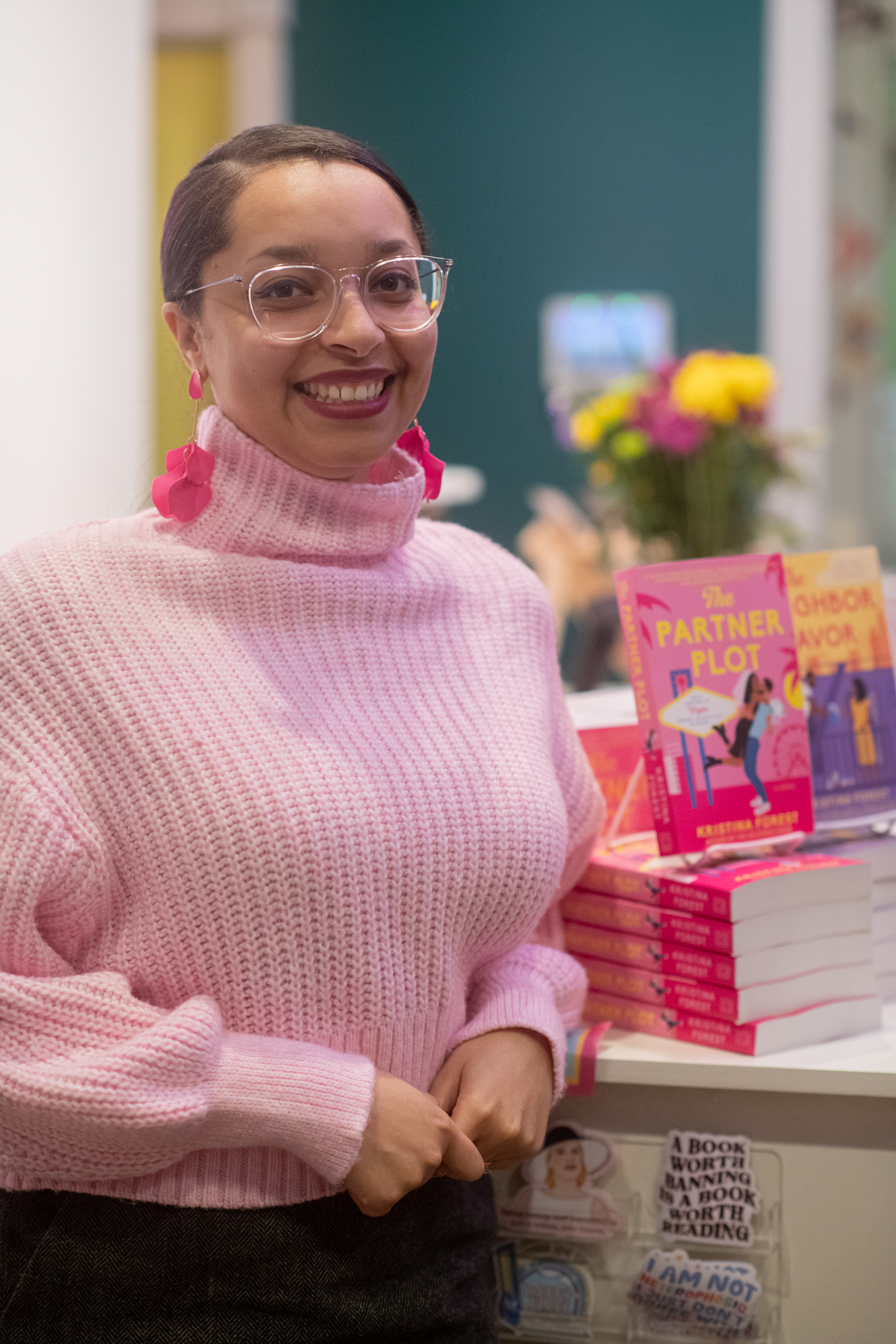
- Forest at Loudmouth Books in Indianapolis
- Education: Rowan University; The New School (MFA)

Kristina Forest is an American romance author of novels for teens and adults, including The Neighbor Favor (2023) and Zyla & Kai (2022). Her most recent novel, The Partner Plot (2024), was Good Morning America's Buzz Pick of February 2024.

== Biography ==
Forest earned a writing arts degree from Rowan University and completed her Master of Fine Arts in Creative Writing at The New School.

Forest began writing young adult fiction; her book The Neighbor Favor began her first adult romance series. The second book in the series, The Partner Plot, was published in February 2024. In a starred review, Kirkus Reviews stated, "Forest's novel is a sweet portrayal of first love and second chances. Violet and Xavier are memorable, real, and vulnerable as they struggle with career sacrifices and the fear of more heartbreak. Yet they were destined from the start—and Forest's romance never misses a shot."

In addition to her work as an author, she has worked as a Subsidiary Rights Coordinator for Penguin Random.

== Personal life ==
Forest lives in New Jersey. She was inspired to write romance novels as a teenager by reading novels by Sarah Dessen, but she wanted to focus on writing romance novels for Black girls and women.

== Publications ==
- I Wanna Be Where You Are (2019)
- Now That I've Found You (2020)
- Zyla & Kai (2022)
- First-Year Orientation (2023)
- The Neighbor Favor (2023)
- The Partner Plot (2024)
