= FNAC =

Fnac (Fédération Nationale d’Achats des Cadres) is a French multinational electronics chain store

FNAC or fnac may also refer to:

- Fine-needle aspiration cytology, a diagnostic procedure used to investigate lumps or masses under the skin
- FNAC (rifle), a variant of the FN SCAR assault rifle
- Fonds national d'art contemporain, a public collection of contemporary art in France

== See also ==
- Prix du roman Fnac, a literary prize established by the retail chain Fnac in 2002
