= Thélyson Orélien =

Haitian-born Canadian writer (born 1988)

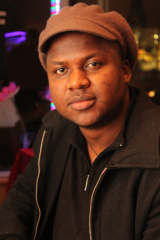
- Born: May 23, 1988 (age 38); Gonaïves, Haiti
- Education: State University of Haiti; Université de Montréal
- Occupations: Novelist; poet
- Writing career
- Language: French
- Period: 2006–present
- Notable work: C'était ça ou mourir (2026)

Thélyson Orélien (born May 23, 1988) is a Haitian-born Canadian novelist and poet. He is best known for his 2026 novel C'était ça ou mourir, published by Éditions du Boréal in Quebec and by Éditions Grasset in France. The work received widespread critical acclaim and appeared on the selection lists for numerous literary awards, including the Prix Goncourt. Orélien was subsequently accused of plagiarism and of using generative AI in several of his works. C'était ça ou mourir was removed from consideration for the Prix Goncourt as a result.

== Early life ==
Orélien was born in 1988 in Gonaïves, Haiti. He is the third of five children and was raised in a middle-class, Creole-speaking Protestant family. His father was an accountant and his mother was a seamstress. He was educated at a private Catholic school. He studied at the State University of Haiti in Port-au-Prince before moving to Canada following the 2010 earthquake, and continued his studies at Université de Montréal in Quebec.

== Career ==
Before the publication of his 2026 novel, Orélien published poetry and some prose but was little known as a writer. He published his first poetry collection, Au-delà du silence, in 2006. In 2007, he was awarded the Prix Interrégional Jeunes Auteurs in Switzerland, taking first place in the langue apprise ('learned language') category, for his poem Les Couleurs de ma terre.

Orélien submitted an unsolicited manuscript to Quebec publisher Éditions du Boréal, which published the novel, titled C'était ça ou mourir ('It Was That or Die'), in March 2026. Before its publication, rights to the novel were already sold in 22 countries. It tells the story of Jonas Dorléon, a young Haitian teacher who flees his country amid gang violence, and his experiences as a migrant venturing to Canada. On September 2, 2026, it was included in the first selection for the Prix Goncourt. It also appeared on selection lists for the Prix Goncourt des lycéens, Prix Décembre, Prix Renaudot, Prix Renaudot des lycéens, Prix du premier roman français, Prix Femina, Prix Femina des lycéens and the Prix Médicis. On September 21, 2026, it was awarded the Prix du roman Fnac.

=== AI and plagiarism allegations ===
On September 21, 2026, an X account named Balance ton Claude ("Expose your Claude") accused C'était ça ou mourir of being "written almost entirely by artificial intelligence", citing analysis by AI detector Pangram. Agence France-Presse (AFP) reported that it tested the excerpts selected by the X account through InVID-WeVerify, a verification tool the news agency co-created, which classified them as "very likely written by a human". AFP also tested the excerpts through other AI detection tools and reported varying results. Éditions Grasset denied the accusations and called them "fake news". Orélien also denied the accusations, saying that he had become the victim of "racist attacks". Grasset described the controversy as a "campaign of hate". In an interview with La Presse, Orélien said, "I have never used artificial intelligence to produce texts," and "Perhaps it's my way of writing; perhaps I should stop writing."

Several of Orélien's other works were subsequently investigated. According to Radio-Canada's Décrypteurs team, about half of his short story "Où va le monde", which was awarded CBC/Radio-Canada's Prix du public in 2012, was plagiarized from The Morning of the Magicians, a book by Louis Pauwels and Jacques Bergier published in 1960. The opening lines closely follow those of the 1960 book, with the last two words removed. According to Le Point, Orélien's opening lines also clumsily copied the original's "débonder une source" as "déborder une source", and elsewhere in the story he copied many sentences verbatim. Radio-Canada also found at least five journalistic pieces by Orélien that were published by Canadian and French media in 2012 and 2013 and which it determined had been partly copied from texts by other writers. Orélien's 2013 opinion piece "Ne mettons pas nos héros sur un piédestal", published in La Presse, was found to have plagiarized a piece published five days earlier in The Philippine Star. This was acknowledged by La Presse, which has now tagged the article saying, "Since the publication of this text, we have learned that its author committed plagiarism." Orélien's 2013 piece "Barack Obama aurait pu être Trayvon Martin il y a trois décennies", published on the blog of France's RFI, included a word-for-word translation from Portuguese to French of at least four paragraphs of "Matin, Obama" by Gilberto Rodrigues, which was published by Pressenza days earlier. His 2013 piece "Le prochain pape devrait être plus jeune", also for RFI, features verbatim almost half of an editorial published in India's The Hindu two days earlier. Additionally, in 2013, his piece "Sommes-nous aussi libres que nous le pensons?", also for RFI, borrowed phrases and paragraphs from "The Problem of Free Will" by Pablo Saborío, published in 2008 on Saborío's personal blog Beyond Language.

On September 24, 2026, the literary news site ActuaLitté reported that a September 17, 2023, article on Orélien's blog appeared to contain a prompt for AI: "Discuss the role of Quebec as the guardian of French linguistic heritage in the Americas" (originally in French). The article was titled "Renaissance littéraire : La littérature québécoise séduit la scène mondiale". ActuaLitté also reported that Libération had tested several of Orélien's columns from the same website with Pangram, which classified them as "100% AI". The report noted that detector scores alone did not establish how a text was written.

On September 24, Éditions du Boréal suspended promotional activities for the novel, citing concern for Orélien's well-being.

On September 25, 2026, the Académie Goncourt removed Orélien's novel from the initial selection for the Prix Goncourt, citing the author's past plagiarism as well as the "consistent findings of several credible researchers and journalists which indicate that C'était ça ou mourir is, in all likelihood, very largely the product of artificial intelligence". In the statement, the academy said it wanted to send a clear message "that we neither condone nor endorse, in any way whatsoever, the creation of texts generated with the assistance of AI". It also said the decision was to preserve the integrity of the Prix Goncourt and Académie Goncourt, stating that its "central role is to promote and reward literature written by women and men".

On October 13, 2026, Orélien again characterized the AI allegations as "slander and heresy", saying he used AI tools "here and there" for research, particularly when researching foreign idioms, but that "not a single sentence in this book was created by a machine, nor the meaning or the structure of a story that comes from my gut." In the same statement, he admitted to the alleged plagiarism committed during his early career, describing them as "unacceptable mistakes" from his youth. On October 14, 2026, Éditions du Boréal published a statement saying, "In the absence of definitive conclusions, the novel will therefore remain available in bookstores." That same day Éditions du Boréal's co-director, Renaud Roussel, told Radio-Canada's Tout un matin, "I have to trust him [...] Today we have a machine that produced a result, a machine whose reliability is often called into question, and we have an author's word. Between the two, between the machine and the author, I choose the human's words."

On October 21, 2026, Éditions du Boréal announced it had cut ties with Orélien, saying that it would not reprint the novel nor publish any future books by Orélien. The publisher said that it had spent the last few weeks working with Orélien to put together a record documenting his writing process, in order to prove that the AI allegations against C'était ça ou mourir were unfounded. However, the publisher said those efforts failed and Orélien refused to provide any further information on the book's writing process. The publisher requested an external analysis of all working versions of the novel, which it says "revealed traces of AI markers in the metadata of certain documents". It said Orélien had repeatedly assured to them he had never used AI tools to write the novel.

== Bibliography ==
=== Novels ===
- Éternels Amants (Éditions Rocheuses, Ottawa, 2023)
- Le rêve de la mer noire (C3 Éditions, Haiti, 2025)
- C'était ça ou mourir (Éditions du Boréal, Montreal, 2026)

=== Poetry ===
- Au-delà du silence (Méga Imprimeur, Gonaives, Haïti, 2006)
- Les Couleurs de ma terre, in La Poésie (Éditions de l'Hèbe, Switzerland, 2007)
- Le Temps qui reste (Éditions des Marges, Montréal, 2015)
- Tant que le silence saigne, je parlerai (Éditions Rocheuses, Ottawa, 2024)

=== Nonfiction ===
- Penser le mot en N: Cartographie d'une blessure vivante (Éditions Rocheuses, Ottawa, 2024)
