= Prix du roman Fnac =

The prix du roman Fnac is a French literary award established in 2002 by the retail chain Fnac.

== List of winners ==
Year		Author	Title	Publisher (x fois)	Notes
2002		Dominique Mainard	Leur histoire	Joëlle Losfeld	
2003		Pierre Charras	Dix-neuf secondes	Mercure de France	
2004		Jean-Paul Dubois	Une vie française	l'Olivier	also prix Femina
2005	nothumb	Pierre Péju	Le Rire de l'ogre	Gallimard	
2006	nothumb	Laurent Mauvignier	Dans la foule	Minuit	
2007		Nathacha Appanah	Le Dernier Frère	l'Olivier (2)	
2008		Jean-Marie Blas De Roblès	Là où les tigres sont chez eux	Zulma	also prix Médicis
2009	nothumb	Yannick Haenel	Jan Karski	Gallimard (2)	also prix Interallié
2010	nothumb	Sofi Oksanen	Purge	Stock	also prix Femina étranger
2011	nothumb	Delphine de Vigan	Rien ne s'oppose à la nuit	JC Lattès	
2012	nothumb	Patrick Deville	Peste et Choléra	Seuil	also prix Femina
2013	nothumb	Julie Bonnie	Chambre 2	Belfond	
2014	nothumb	Benjamin Wood	Le Complexe d'Eden Bellwether	Zulma (2)	
2015	nothumb	Laurent Binet	La Septième Fonction du langage	Grasset	also prix Interallié
2016	nothumb	Gaël Faye	Petit Pays	Grasset	
2017	nothumb	Véronique Olmi	Bakhita	Albin Michel	
2018	nothumb	Adeline Dieudonné	La vraie vie	L'Iconoclaste	
2019		Bérengère Cornut	De pierre et d'os	Le Tripode	
2020		Tiffany McDaniel	Betty	Gallmeister	
2021		Jean-Baptiste Del Amo	Le fils de l'homme	Gallimard	
2022		Sarah Jollien-Fardel	Sa favoris	Éditions Sabine Wespieser	
2023		Jean-Baptiste Andrea	Watching Over Her	L'Iconoclaste	
2024		Marie Vingtras	Les ames fétéreuses	Éditions de l'Olivier	
2025	nothumb	John Boyne	The Elements	Transworld	
2026	nothumb	Thélyson Orélien	C'était ça ou mourir	Grasset	
