= Watching Over Her =

2023 novel by Jean-Baptiste Andrea

- First edition cover
- Author: Jean-Baptiste Andrea
- Original title: Veiller sur elle
- Translator: Frank Wynne
- Language: French
- Publisher: L'Iconoclaste
- Publication date: 17 August 2023
- Publication place: Paris
- English publication date: 28 August 2025
- Pages: 584
- Awards: Prix Goncourt (2023)
- ISBN: 978-2-378-80375-9

Watching Over Her (French: Veiller sur elle) is a 2023 novel by French author Jean-Baptiste Andrea. It was published on 17 August 2023, by the French independent publisher L'Iconoclaste. It received the Prix Goncourt on 7 November 2023. It has sold over 700,000 copies, making it one of the best-selling Goncourt winners. Watching Over Her was also recipient of the Prix du roman Fnac and the Grand Prix des Lectrices de Elle.

The book has been translated into 34 different languages. The English translation by Frank Wynne was published by Atlantic Books on 28 August 2025.

== Synopsis ==
Spanning several decades in 20th-century Italy, the novel focuses on a poor sculptor named Michelangelo "Mimo" Vitaliani, and his tumultuous relationship with Viola Orsini, the daughter of an aristocratic family.

== Film adaptation ==
In June 2024, it was announced that former Pathé executives Muriel Sauzay and François Ivernel secured the screen rights to the novel for an adaptation produced by their company Montebello.
