= Alexandra Holden =

American actress

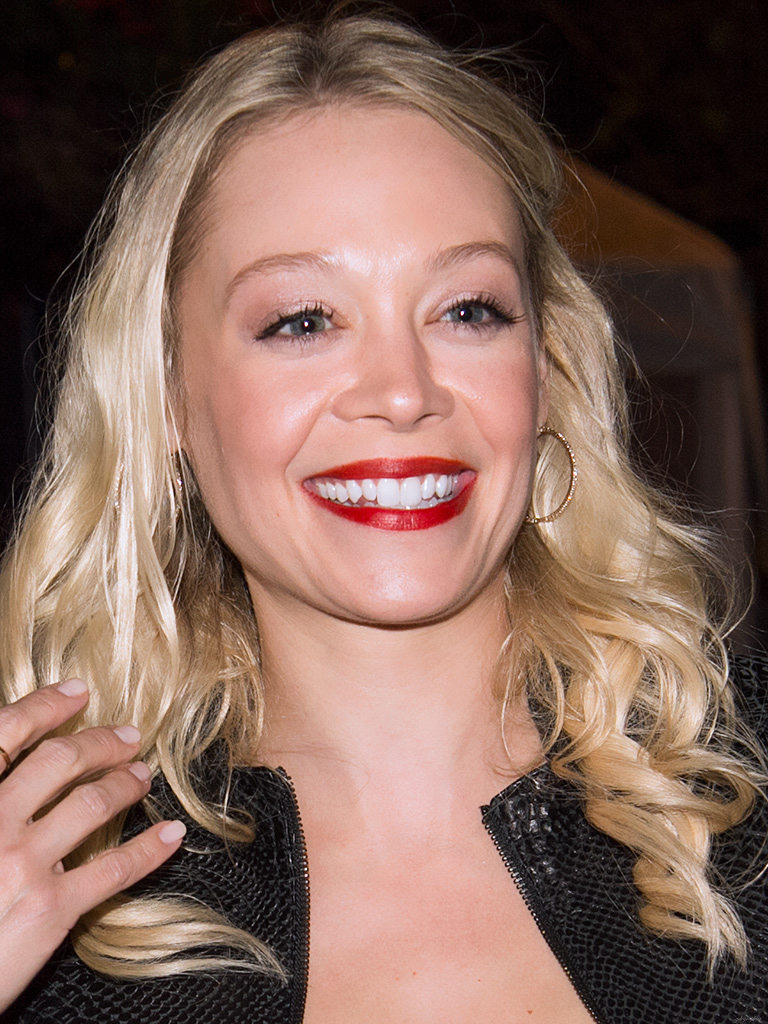
- Alexandra Holden in 2011
- Occupation: Actress
- Years active: 1996–present
- Spouse: Johnny Strong (m. 1997, divorced)

Alexandra Holden is an American actress. Known for her film work in the comedy and horror genres, her credits include In & Out (1997), Drop Dead Gorgeous (1999), Sugar & Spice (2001), The Hot Chick (2002), Wishcraft (2002), Dead End (2003), and Lovely Molly (2011). Her television work includes recurring roles on series such as Friends, Ally McBeal, Friday Night Lights, Franklin & Bash, and Rizzoli & Isles.

== Early life ==
Holden is of English, German, Swedish, Norwegian, Scottish and Irish descent.

== Career ==
=== Film ===
Holden made her screen debut in 1997, playing the supporting role of Vicky in the low-budget drama The Last Time I Committed Suicide. She had parts in a range of comedies throughout the late 1990s and early 2000s, such as In & Out (1997), EDtv (1999), Drop Dead Gorgeous (1999), Sugar & Spice (2001), and The Hot Chick (2002). Next, she starred in the horror films Wishcraft (2002), Dead End (2003), Dark Reel (2008), Lovely Molly (2011), and Always Watching: A Marble Hornets Story (2015). Other notable credits include American Gun (2002), How to Deal (2003), Special (2006), All the Days Before Tomorrow (2007), In a World... (2013), and the crime thriller Other Monsters (2022).

=== Television ===
Holden guest-starred as Elizabeth Stevens, a student who dates Ross Geller, on the sixth season of Friends (2000). She then played Frania Beatus, a Warsaw Ghetto partisan, in the critically acclaimed NBC television film Uprising (2001), and went on to play recurring roles on Ally McBeal (2001), Friday Night Lights (2007), Franklin & Bash (2011), and Rizzoli & Isles (2012–2014).

== Other work ==
In 1997, Holden appeared in the music video for Aerosmith's "Hole in My Soul".

== Personal life ==
Holden married actor Johnny Strong on December 10, 1997. They have since divorced.

== Filmography ==
=== Film ===
Year	Title	Role	Notes
1997	The Last Time I Committed Suicide	Vicky	
1997	In & Out	Meredith	
1998	Dancer, Texas Pop. 81	Vivian	
1999	Guinevere	Angelic Girl	
1999	EDtv	College Girl	
1999	Drop Dead Gorgeous	Mary Johanson	
2001	Sugar & Spice	Fern Rogers	
2001	Uprising	Frania Beatus	TV film
2002	Wishcraft	Samantha Warren	
2002	American Gun	Mia	
2002	Four Reasons	Nurse	
2002	The Hot Chick	Lulu	
2003	Dead End	Marion Harrington	
2003	Moving Alan	Dee Dee	
2003	How to Deal	Scarlett Smith	
2003	Purgatory Flats	Sunny Burkhardt	
2005	Everything's Gone Green	Rosemary	Short film
2005	Window Theory	Kate	
2005	Everything You Want	Jessica Lindstrom	TV film
2006	Special	Maggie	
2006	Wasted	Amber	
2006	A Trick of the Mind	Jennifer	TV film
2006	A Dead Calling	Rachel Beckwith	
2007	All the Days Before Tomorrow	Alison	
2008	The Frequency of Claire	Claire	
2008	Dark Reel	Scarlett May	
2009	Post Grad	Cute Funky Girl	
2010	Healing Hands	Natasha Waverly	TV film
2011	Lovely Molly	Hannah	
2011	Let Go	Kelly	
2013	In a World...	Jamie	
2014	Zoe Gone	Alicia Lynne	
2015	Loaded	April	
2015	Always Watching: A Marble Hornets Story	Rose	
2022	Other Monsters	Laura	

=== Television ===
Year	Title	Role	Notes
1996–1997	Mr. Rhodes	Dani Swanson	3 episodes
1997	Cracker	Debbie	2 episodes
2000	Once and Again	Cassidy	2 episodes
2000	Friends	Elizabeth Stevens	5 episodes
2001	Ally McBeal	Jane Wilco	3 episodes
2002	Six Feet Under	Rebecca Leah Milford	Episode: "In the Game"
2004	Tru Calling	Jackie Connors	Episode: "Drop Dead Gorgeous"
2006	Grey's Anatomy	Jaime Carr	Episode: "Where the Boys Are"
2007	Friday Night Lights	Suzy	5 episodes
2008	CSI: Miami	Carla Hoyle	Episode: "Gone Baby Gone"
2008	Private Practice	Laura Larson	Episode: "Serving Two Masters"
2009	Cold Case	Caroline Kemp in 1958	Episode: "Libertyville"
2009	Royal Pains	Zoe Hill	Episode: "Wonderland"
2010	The Mentalist	Crystal Hargrove	Episode: "Blood in, Blood Out"
2011	Franklin & Bash	Debbie Wilcox	5 episodes
2011	Friends with Benefits	Dakota	Episode: "Pilot"
2011	Man Up!	Rebecca	Episode: "High Road is the Guy Road"
2011	Covert Affairs	Grace Langford	Episode: "Horse to Water"
2012	Bones	Margot Sandoval	Episode: "The Partners in the Divorce"
2012	NCIS	Brooke Fenton	Episode: "Shell Shock (Part II)"
2012–2014	Rizzoli & Isles	Lydia Sparks	6 episodes
2013	The Mob Doctor	Bethany Maslan	Episode: "Resurrection"
2013	Vegas	Dawn Fields	Episode: "From This Day Forward"
2013	Drop Dead Diva	Becca Holt	Episode: "One Shot"
2014	CSI	Mary Haymond	Episode: "Dead Rails"
2014	NCIS: Los Angeles	Elise Elena Jaeger	Episode: "War Cries"
