= How to Deal =

- Theatrical release poster
- Directed by: Clare Kilner
- Written by: Neena Beber
- Based on: That Summer and Someone Like You by Sarah Dessen
- Produced by: Erica Huggins; William Teitler
- Starring: Mandy Moore; Allison Janney; Trent Ford; Alexandra Holden; Dylan Baker; Peter Gallagher
- Cinematography: Eric Alan Edwards
- Edited by: Shawna Callahan; Janice Hampton
- Music by: David Kitay
- Production companies: Radar Pictures; Golden Mean Productions
- Distributed by: New Line Cinema (United States); Focus Features (International)
- Release date: July 18, 2003
- Running time: 101 minutes
- Country: United States
- Language: English
- Budget: $16 million
- Box office: $14.3 million

How to Deal is a 2003 American romantic comedy-drama film directed by Clare Kilner and starring Mandy Moore, Allison Janney, and Trent Ford. The film is based on Sarah Dessen's novels That Summer and Someone Like You.

== Plot ==
Halley Martin is a 17-year-old high school student who is disillusioned with love after seeing many dysfunctional relationships around her. Her parents are now divorced and her father, Len Martin, a radio talk show host, has a new young girlfriend that the entire family despises. Her mother, Lydia, is now always alone while her sister, Ashley, is so overwhelmed by her upcoming wedding with Lewis Warsher that she barely exists in the house. The shallowness of all the teens at her school convinces Halley that finding true love is impossible.

When Halley walks in on her best friend Scarlett having sex with her boyfriend, the high school soccer champ, Michael Sherwood, Halley tries to warn her of the complications that lie ahead. Ignoring her advice, Scarlett embarks on a summer fling with Michael. In the meantime, Halley must deal with Ashley and the rest of the Martins must deal with her soon-to-be in-laws, Lewis' overbearing Southern parents, who have an African American maid. In the meantime, Halley runs into classmate Macon Forrester, a slacker who never shows up for biology and is more interested in having fun than school work. He is Michael Sherwood's best friend.

Then a few weeks later, Michael dies of a heart defect on the soccer field while Halley, Scarlett and other classmates watch helplessly. This event changes the lives of Halley and Scarlett forever. While Scarlett does her best to look beautiful for Michael at his funeral, Macon gives a moving speech about his friend. Struggling with Michael's death, Scarlett, at age sixteen, soon learns that she is pregnant with his child. With Halley at her side, Scarlett reveals the pregnancy to her mother.

Halley's father, Len Martin, marries his mistress, Lorna, in a beach-side ceremony, with guests from all over the world, or "within his radio frequency", as Halley puts it.

Halley and Macon eventually start a relationship. He takes her to his and Michael's favorite hangout and once come close to having sex. Halley and her mother get into an argument and on New Year's Eve that got her punished, Halley sneaks out with Macon to a party. Again, they come very close to having sex but this time Halley stops it and Macon is upset. On their way home, they are both upset and distracted and hit a tree. Halley gets a broken arm, but otherwise they both walk away from it unharmed, but Halley breaks up with Macon saying that she can't wait around for him to grow up. Later things go awry when Halley finds Ashley drunk on the family's front porch. Finding a male stripper's thong around her neck, Halley witnesses the break-up of her sister's engagement. She also learns that her mother sneaks out once a week to have sex with a man she met a couple of weeks previously, Steve. After another make-up, Lewis proposes to Ashley again, this time at a crowded airport: she says yes.

On the day of Ashley and Lewis' wedding, Macon bursts into Len's radio studio, professing his apologies and love to Halley. He then heads to the wedding. On the way, he finds Scarlett, who insisted on walking to the wedding, going into labor on the side of the road. He puts her in the car and walks into the wedding, getting Halley's attention. The three rush to the hospital, leaving Scarlett's mother left behind.

While Scarlett is having her baby, Halley makes a list of all the little things she hates about Macon, the way his hair falls over his face, the way his voice gets low when he's serious, the way he bites his lip when he's nervous and the way his eyebrow twitches. Halley playfully uses Macon's 'Jedi Mind Trick' and they kiss and dance briefly in the hallway. The movie then ends with Halley and Macon embracing and viewers see that Scarlett gave birth to a baby girl.

== Cast ==
- Mandy Moore as Halley Martin
- Allison Janney as Lydia Williams Martin
- Trent Ford as Macon Forrester
- Alexandra Holden as Scarlett Smith
- Dylan Baker as Steve Beckwith
- Nina Foch as Grandma Halley Williams
- Peter Gallagher as Len Martin
- Mackenzie Astin as Lewis Gibson Warsher II
- Connie Ray as Marion Smith
- Mary Catherine Garrison as Ashley Renee Martin
- Sonja Smits as Carol Warsher
- Laura Catalano as Lorna Queen
- Ray Kahnert as Donald Sherwood
- Andrew Gillies as Buck Warsher
- John White as Michael Sherwood
- Alison MacLeod as Sharon Sherwood
- Bill Lake as Ed
- Charlotte Sullivan as Elizabeth Gunderson
- Philip Akin as Mr. Bowden
- Claire Crawford as Seamstress
- Ennis Esmer as Ronnie
- Thomas Hauff as Minister

== Soundtrack ==
=== Track listing ===
1. "Billy S." - Skye Sweetnam
2. "Do You Realize??" - The Flaming Lips
3. "It's on the Rocks" - The Donnas
4. "Why Can't I?" - Liz Phair
5. "Wild World" - Beth Orton
6. "Not Myself" - John Mayer
7. "That's When I Love You" - Aslyn
8. "Thinking About Tomorrow" - Beth Orton
9. "Promise Ring" - Tremolo
10. "Take the Long Road and Walk It" - The Music
11. "Waves" - Marjorie Fair
12. "Surrender" - Echo
13. "Wild World" - Cat Stevens

== Reception ==
=== Critical reception ===
The film was not well received. On Rotten Tomatoes, it received a 27% approval rating based on 98 reviews, with an average rating 4.6/10. The site's consensus describes it as a "soap opera for teens." Metacritic, which uses a weighted average, assigned the film a score of 45 out of 100, based on 29 critics, indicating "mixed or average" reviews.

=== Box office ===
In its opening weekend, the film grossed $5,809,960 million in 2,319 theaters in the United States and Canada, ranking #8 at the box office. By the end of its run, How to Deal grossed $14,195,227 domestically and $112,905 internationally, totaling $14,308,132 worldwide.
