= Dead End (2003 film) =

- Film poster
- Directed by: Jean-Baptiste Andrea; Fabrice Canepa
- Written by: Jean-Baptiste Andrea; Fabrice Canepa
- Produced by: James Huth; Sonja Shillito; Gabriella Stollenwerck; Cécile Telerman
- Starring: Ray Wise; Alexandra Holden; Lin Shaye; Mick Cain; Billy Asher; Amber Smith
- Cinematography: Alexander Buono
- Edited by: Antoine Vareille
- Music by: Greg De Belles
- Production companies: Sagittaire Films; Captain Movies; StudioCanal
- Distributed by: Lions Gate Films
- Release dates: 30 January 2003 (Gerardmer Film Festival); 12 December 2003 (United Kingdom); 9 November 2004 (U.S.)
- Running time: 85 minutes
- Country: France
- Language: English
- Budget: $900,000
- Box office: 800,000

Dead End is a 2003 English-language French horror film written and directed by Jean-Baptiste Andrea and Fabrice Canepa, and starring Alexandra Holden, Ray Wise, Lin Shaye, Mick Cain, Billy Asher, and Amber Smith. It tells the story of a dysfunctional family who find themselves on a never-ending road in the middle of a forest during a routine drive on Christmas Eve, while under pursuit of a mysterious hearse and a woman dressed in white.

== Plot ==
Driving on Christmas Eve with his family, Frank Harrington decides to take a short cut through a remote location because he is "bored" with the usual route. In the car with him: his wife Laura, his son, Richard, his daughter, Marion, and her boyfriend, Brad.

After a near-collision with another car, a white-clad woman appears at Frank's window, holding a baby. Marion suggests they drive the woman to a nearby cabin; because the car is full, she volunteers to follow behind them on foot. When they arrive at the cabin, Frank and Laura go to explore it and Richard disappears into the woods, leaving Brad alone with the woman. He asks how the child she carries can breathe with its face covered by blankets. She replies that it is dead and shows him the corpse. His screams of terror draw Richard back to the car, but Brad and the woman are nowhere to be seen. As she walks to the cabin, Marion sees a hearse drive by with Brad screaming for help in the back. When she gets to the cabin, she makes them pursue the hearse.

They find Brad's mutilated body in the road. Laura calls the police but on the end of the line is a woman begging for help, something that she hides from her family. As they continue to drive, Frank and Laura argue, and he reveals that he dislikes her family. When they stop to investigate a baby carriage in the road, Richard is abducted by the hearse. While the three run to save Richard, Frank sees the "woman in white" again. They find Richard's body and Laura begins to show signs of insanity.

The family pass a sign that says "Marcott" and Frank realizes that this must be a military road that is not on the map. During another stop, Laura shoots Frank in the leg with a shotgun that was intended to be a present for a family member. Shortly after, Laura talks about seeing the face of a friend who had died 20 years earlier in the woods and jumps out of the car to "visit" with her. The hearse appears again, but Frank manages to ward it off with the shotgun. Instead he shoots Laura in the head, killing her. Frank and Marion take her to a nearby rangers station, where Frank writes a note to later give to Marion. The woman in white attacks Frank. Afterwards, he becomes deranged and beats Marion into unconsciousness. Seeing the woman in white again, he pursues her into the woods, where he is killed by an unseen force.

Marion awakens and, because the car is out of gas, walks for help. She finds body bags containing her dead family members in the middle of the road. The woman in white appears, tells her that the hearse isn't there for her, then gets into the hearse and drives off.

Marion suddenly awakens in the hospital, heavily bandaged. Dr. Marcott tells her of her coma and assures Marion that she and the baby will be fine. On the way out of the hospital, the doctor talks to a man claiming to be the one that found the family after the car crash. The man confirms that only Marion survived and that the crash also claimed the life of a young woman and her baby in the other car. When the doctor tries to leave, her car fails to start, and the man who found the family offers her a lift in the same hearse from Marion's dream.

Two workers who are sweeping up debris from the crash find the note Frank had written to Marion before their final stop.

== Cast ==
- Ray Wise as Frank Harrington
- Lin Shaye as Laura Harrington
- Mick Cain as Richard Harrington
- Alexandra Holden as Marion Harrington
- Billy Asher as Brad Miller
- Amber Smith as Lady in White
- Karen S. Gregan as Dr. Helen Marcott
- Sharon Madden as Nurse
- Steve Valentine as Man in Black
- Jimmie F. Skaggs as 1st Worker
- Clement Blake as 2nd Worker

== Production ==
The film was shot in Los Angeles County, California in 2002.

== Release ==
After its premiere at the Festival international du film fantastique de Gérardmer in January 2003, the film received a theatrical release in the United Kingdom on 12 December 2003.

=== Critical response ===
On Rotten Tomatoes, the film has an approval rating of 78% based on 9 reviews, with an average rating of 6.4/10.

Peter Bradshaw of The Guardian praised the film as "macabre and supernatural in the approved manner, not stunningly original, but with some ingenious twists and humorous performances." Neil Smith of BBC gave the film three out of five stars, writing "Dead End— feels like an extended episode of The Twilight Zone, but it's witty and chilling enough to offer some spine-tingling surprises en route." Variety's Derek Elley wrote: "With most of the gore off-screen, and almost the entire film set within the family car or on the country road, Andrea & Canepa manage to sustain interest largely through dialogue, pitched at a satisfyingly pulpy level and played with straight-faced glee by the small cast."

John Noonan of HorrorNews.net gave the film a positive review, writing, "A potent mix of nasty and fun, Dead End is the perfect film to put on at family gatherings to get them all out of your house." Arrow in the Head rated the film a score of 7 out of 10, commending the film's atmosphere, performances, humor, and tension, while criticizing the soundtrack as being "a mixed bag". Johnny Butane from Dread Central gave the film a score of 3.5 out of 5, praising the film's performances, plot, and blend of thrills and humor, while noting the film's weak ending.

=== Accolades ===
- 2004 – Fantasporto – International Fantasy Film Award – Nominee Only
- 2004 – Peñíscola Comedy Film Festival – Best Actress (Lin Shaye) – Winner
- 2004 – Peñíscola Comedy Film Festival – Best First Work – Winner
- 2003 – Brussels International Festival of Fantasy Film – Grand Prize of European Fantasy Film in Silver – Winner
- 2003 – Brussels International Festival of Fantasy Film – Pegasus Audience Award – Winner
- 2003 – Cinénygma - Luxembourg International Film Festival – Grand Prize of European Fantasy Film in Gold – Nominated only
- 2003 – Doaui First Film Festival – Youth Jury Award – Winner
- 2003 – Fant-Asia Film Festival – Jury Prize – Winner
- 2003 – San Sebastián Horror and Fantasy Film Festival – Audience Award – Winner
