= Wishcraft =

- Directed by: Richard Wenk (credited as Danny Graves)
- Written by: Larry Katz
- Produced by: Larry Katz; Jeanne Marie Van Cott
- Starring: Alexandra Holden; Michael Weston; Huntley Ritter; Michael Aday
- Cinematography: Suki Medencevic
- Edited by: Tim Board
- Music by: J. Peter Robinson
- Production company: Gold Circle Films
- Distributed by: Wishcraft LLC
- Release dates: March 23, 2002 (Brussels International Festival of Fantasy Films); February 24, 2002 (United States)
- Running time: 102 minutes
- Country: United States
- Language: English
- Budget: $5,000,000 (Estimated)

Wishcraft is a 2002 American slasher film directed by Richard Wenk (credited as Danny Graves) and starring Michael Weston and Alexandra Holden. The screenplay concerns a teenager who receives a talisman that gives him three wishes.

== Plot ==
A high school student named Brett Bumpers (Weston) receives a mysterious package one day. It contains a bull penis totem with a note explaining that it will grant him three wishes. His first wish is for Samantha (Alexandra Holden) to go to a spring dance with him. Samantha invites him to the dance the next day, and he suspects his wish has come true. Samantha's boyfriend Cody is the star jock at the school, and he is humiliated by Samantha's decision.

After the dance, one of Cody's buddies is murdered by a cloaked figure with a grotesquely disfigured face. When Brett drops Samantha off at home, she suggests they should return to being friends. Heartbroken, Brett makes his second wish: for Samantha to become his girlfriend and actually fall in love with him. Samantha breaks up with Cody the next day and initiates a relationship with Brett. Meanwhile, the cloaked figure continues to kill students at the high school.

Feeling guilty about wishing Samantha into a relationship, Brett confesses the truth to her. As Samantha is coming to grips with the truth, the cloaked figure attacks the pair. He lures Brett away from Samantha and then reveals himself to be Brett's history teacher, Mr. Turner (Austin Pendleton). Mr. Turner explained that he had bought the totem and discovered it granted wishes. He wished his wife dead to avoid divorcing her. Then he wished for "fuck-you-money", and he promptly got $100 million, which he hid in a Swiss bank account. Mr. Turner confessed that he also wished for supernatural strength because he decided to kill problem students at the school. As he was killing the students on his list, he sent the totem to Brett because he was an exemplary student. If the totem is given to another person, that person can also make three wishes.

Mr. Turner then reveals that Samantha is the last name on his list. Just as he is about to kill Samantha, Brett makes his third wish, asking for more strength and agility than Mr. Turner. The two struggle, and eventually, Brett kills Mr. Turner with a samurai sword. Brett gives the totem to Samantha so that she is not forced to love him against her will. She uses the totem to begin their relationship again, but this time, on her terms.

== Cast ==
- Michael Weston as Brett Bumpers
- Alexandra Holden as Samantha Warren
- Huntley Ritter as Cody
- Austin Pendleton as Mr. Turner
- A.J. Buckley as Howie
- Scott Caudill as Blaine
- Michael Aday as Detective Sparky Shaw
- Gregory Cooke as Detective Jeff Bauer
- Emily Arlook as Hannah Bumpers

== Reception ==
Website Beyond Hollywood gave the film a positive review, stating: "The film doesn’t have the Hollywood slick and gloss, but it makes up for the lack of visual polish with a surprisingly good script and an all-around good cast." Eye for Film gave Wishcraft two out of film stars, saying that only fans of the genre would enjoy the film: "Perhaps dedicated fans of the genre might find some solace in the films use of the old horror clichés, but I don't think anyone else will. Still, at least there's plenty of suspects for you to play Guess The Psycho..." Luisito Joaquín González from Slash Above also reviewed the film, concluding: "Of the myriad of Scream imitators that were unleashed during the early noughties, Wishcraft is most definitely not one of the worst that you can place your hands upon. Weston and Holden make for an agreeable pairing and the film is worth seeing for maintaining an impressive pace and generating moments of unique humour. It is an ok time-waster rather than a good one and I can’t help but feel that it tries too hard to have one over on Wes Craven and Kevin Williamson."
