= Along for the Ride (film) =

2022 American film by Sofia Alvarez

- Official release poster
- Directed by: Sofia Alvarez
- Screenplay by: Sofia Alvarez
- Based on: Along for the Ride by Sarah Dessen
- Produced by: Bryan Unkeless; Eric Newman
- Starring: Emma Pasarow; Belmont Cameli; Kate Bosworth; Dermot Mulroney; Andie MacDowell
- Cinematography: Luca Del Puppo
- Edited by: Justin Chan
- Music by: Beach House
- Production company: Screen Arcade
- Distributed by: Netflix
- Release date: May 6, 2022
- Running time: 106 minutes
- Country: United States
- Language: English

Along for the Ride is a 2022 American romantic drama film written and directed by Sofia Alvarez, based on the novel of the same name by Sarah Dessen. The film stars Emma Pasarow, Belmont Cameli, Kate Bosworth, Laura Kariuki, Andie MacDowell and Dermot Mulroney. The film was released on May 6, 2022, by Netflix.

The film's official logline reads: "The summer before college Auden meets the mysterious Eli, a fellow insomniac. While the seaside town of Colby sleeps, the two embark on a nightly quest to help Auden experience the fun, carefree teen life she never knew she wanted."

== Plot ==
Eighteen-year-old Auden West, a recent high school graduate, goes to stay with her father Robert in the small beachside town of Colby, wanting to spend a carefree summer reinventing herself before she leaves for college. A daughter of academics and an exemplary student, her mother Victoria objects to her wanting to spend time with her father. An absentee dad for years, locking himself away in his office to work on his studies, he has an infant daughter Thisbe with his new wife, Heidi.

Upon Heidi's suggestion, Auden goes to a place called "the Tip" on her first day. Wanting to experiment, she makes out with a guy, later regretting it. Heidi takes her in to her shop the next day, where she's to look after the receipts. She meets three other girls - Leah, Esther and Maggie - who work there. Maggie, ex-girlfriend of the guy Auden had kissed, is initially cold towards Auden.

A loner and night-person, Auden roams the streets after everyone else is asleep. Ten days after her arrival she meets fellow insomniac Eli Stock. A BMX biker, he takes her on nightly adventures and he challenges her to a quest to do all the things she missed out on in her childhood. On their first outing, they go to a secret pie shop, and he introduces her to Connect Four. The next day, they play mini golf and she tells him that she didn't attend her prom and regrets not being able to wear her prom dress.

Auden's mother turns up on a rainy day, taking her for lunch. As she expresses her disapproval of Auden bonding with Heidi, Maggie later comforts an upset Auden and the two slowly bond. Auden gets closer to the girls, being invited both to watch Maggie do cross-country BMX biking and to a Conch House party. There she finds out that Eli's best friend and BMX partner Abe died in an accident where Eli was driving, since which Eli has shut himself from everyone.

During an outing to the drive-in to see The Princess Bride, Auden and Eli talk about being night-owls. She admits that it started when she was a child, from trying to prevent her parents from fighting, but he doesn't talk about himself and deflects the topic. That night, she finds videos of him and Abe on YouTube.

Another evening, Auden agrees to do the quest, so they break into the lighthouse. Later, talking in Eli's truck, he pushes the idea of learning to ride a bike again, and she tries to bring up his BMX biking, but neither want to talk about it. A night when he is wheeling her around in a shopping cart, it falls over and, although she is fine, Eli panics and keeps on apologising. Worried, Auden asks him if he wants to talk about something, but Eli ignores the topic.

Auden asks Eli to attend the annual Fourth of July "Hot Dog Party" with her. Eli refuses, saying he dislikes parties. He gets upset when Auden brings up Abe. Hours later he actually shows up, surprising everyone. A food fight ensues and afterwards, during a night swim, Auden and Eli kiss for the first time under the fireworks.

On a coffee run, Auden sees her dad with a suitcase in front of the café. He reveals that he has temporarily left the house as he feels that Heidi is behaving unreasonably. Auden criticizes him for never trying hard and giving up the moment things become difficult. Auden calls her mother for help, who supports Heidi for taking a stand for herself and assures her that she did the right thing by demanding better from Robert. Affected by Auden's words, Robert eventually returns. After an honest conversation with Heidi, Robert takes on his fatherly responsibilities that he had long avoided, and starts helping out with Thisbe. Auden reconciles with her mother, who apologizes for acting jealous.

Auden and Eli have a temporary falling out. She refuses to admit, out of embarrassment, that she doesn't know how to ride a bike and when Eli tries to tell her it's fine, she gets angry at him and calls him out for giving up his dream of pursuing biking due to Abe's death. Later, after talking with Heidi, Auden asks Maggie to teach her how to ride a bike and slowly learns. Eli gets back to training and competes in the skate park in a biking competition days later. Auden congratulates him on his win, as Eli admits that he had quit biking because it reminded him of Abe but now realizes that he loves biking too much to give it up.

The next day, Eli shows up wearing a tux, so Auden comes out wearing her prom dress. She bikes with him to the beach, their friends join them also dressed for the prom, and they have an impromptu party where Auden and Eli kiss again.

In the closing scene, Auden, who is in college, reads a postcard from Eli who is in Barcelona. She and Maggie, who is her college roommate, then head to lunch.

== Cast ==
- Emma Pasarow as Auden
- Belmont Cameli as Eli
- Kate Bosworth as Heidi
- Laura Kariuki as Maggie
- Andie MacDowell as Victoria
- Dermot Mulroney as Robert
- Genevieve Hannelius as Leah
- Samia Finnerty as Esther
- Paul Karmiryan as Adam
- Marcus Scribner as Wallace
- Ricardo Hurtado as Jake

== Production ==
In April 2021, Deadline Hollywood announced that production had begun on a film adaptation of Sarah Dessen's 2009 novel Along for the Ride after Netflix acquired film rights. Sofia Alvarez, who had previously adapted two of Jenny Han's novels for the platform, was hired to write the screenplay and direct the film.

Principal photography began on April 22, 2021, in Carolina Beach, North Carolina, with location shooting in the North Carolina localities of Wilmington, Kure Beach and Oak Island. Filming continued through early June which included shooting at County Line MX, located in Bolton, North Carolina.

== Release ==
Along for the Ride debuted on Netflix on May 6, 2022.

== Reception ==
On the review aggregator website Rotten Tomatoes, 57% of 23 critics' reviews are positive, with an average rating of 5.8/10. A large majority of the criticism towards the film is from reviewers saying that the film is a dumbed down version of Dessen's novel, while others said the film was cheesy but had compelling and emotional moments with great performances by the actors. At least one critic said the film lacks the continuous spark of a traditional teen rom-com, seen in To All The Boys I've Loved Before, and laid partial blame on the perceived flat and bottled Auden portrayal by Pasarow. The flatness of the characters was echoed by a New York Times reviewer who said the characters had all majorly been dumbed down to present an "Instagram-friendly" adaptation, leaving the film with no clear conflict or stakes. Another reviewer highlighted the effect of the film's shooting location, saying that along with the script and actresses, the shooting locations in North Carolina helped bring the film's setting to life.
