= The Moon and More =

2013 book by Sarah Dessen

- First edition
- Author: Sarah Dessen
- Language: English
- Genre: Young Adult
- Published: June 4, 2013
- Publisher: Viking
- Publication place: United States
- ISBN: 9780670785605

The Moon and More is Sarah Dessen's eleventh book, published in June 2013, and is a young adult novel. The protagonist, Emaline is a Colby native, a small beachside town, and so summer at the beach for her means hard work and a new population of beach goers. During this, her last summer before college, Emaline meets Theo while working for her family's rental business. He's a city boy who's come to Colby as the assistant to a high-strung documentary filmmaker who's in town to profile a reclusive local artist. Emaline knows he's not her type, but she can not help feeling drawn to him. And as their relationship develops, Emaline finds herself questioning her own goals, values, and choices.

== Plot summary ==
Emaline is spending the summer working for her family's real estate agency and getting ready to head to the local college in the fall. Her plans for the summer involve working at her family's realty, while hanging out with her two best friends Daisy and Morris, and her boyfriend Luke. She plans to attend the local university in the fall, East U, with her high school sweetheart Luke, on a full ride scholarship. Emaline longs for a summer like a tourist, one where she isn't a supporting character in someone else's summer romance, but where she is the lead in hers.

But things don't go according to plan. First, Emaline's biological father turns up in Colby. He had been urging Emaline to apply to Ivy League schools and even offered to help pay her tuition, but mysteriously rescinded his offer once she got into Columbia. Her father brings along her half-brother Benji, whom she has to spend time with. Then Emaline starts noticing that she and Luke aren't as much in sync as usual, and that they haven't been since earlier that spring in April. Finally, a documentary filmmaker from New York shows up in town to interview Clyde Conway, a mysterious artist who disappeared at the height of his career. The filmmaker, Ivy, has brought along her young assistant, Theo, who is eager to impress his boss by getting Emaline to show him the lay of the land in Colby.

After she finds out that Luke cheated on her, Emaline turns to Theo and experiences the summer romance she always wanted. Except, her summer romance doesn't turn out to be what she thought it would be: she realizes Theo is selfish and has been using her for his own agenda. Emaline also learns that her father and his wife are getting a divorce, which is why he couldn't pay for her college tuition. She also tries to help Benji cope with his family's divorce.

In the end Emaline realizes what is really important to her: family. She no longer longs for a life outside of Colby. She doesn't end up with either guy, although she remains good friends with Luke. The novel ends with Emaline interning for Ivy in New York City. Morris is helping Clyde with an art tour.

== Characters ==
Emaline: A local girl in a small beach town by the name of Colby. She is in her summer between college and high school, with a summer job of working at her family's real estate agency; Colby Realty. At the start of the book she is in a relationship with local golden boy Luke who embodies the town of Colby. She is best friends with Daisy who works at her family's (and the town's only) nail shop, Wave Nails. Emaline later meets a film student from New York, an aspiring documentarist named Theo, who introduced her to all the wonders outside of Colby. Emaline is faced with many life decisions of whether to face her fears and venture out into the world of uncertainty or stay with the familiarity.

Luke: Cleans pools in order to make money. Loves to walk around shirtless. Is an all-around nice guy.

Theo: Hipster from NYC. He's an intern for Ivy, trying to make a name in the art world. Acts like he's dating Emaline but is really just using her.

Morris: A local boy from Colby as well who has grown up with Emaline, Daisy and Luke. He is the lazy one in the group, really laid back and if he is given instructions, they need to be very detailed instructions. His personality is hinted at because he has not had a father in his life and his mother is all but interested in his life. Emaline has looked out for Morris since the third grade no matter how frustrating he may be. Rob, Emaline's stepdad, even gives Morris a job and doesn't fire him because he feels the same way Emaline does about Morris. Morris is also the boyfriend of Daisy.

Daisy: Fashion-forward Asian friend. Dating Morris.

Benji: Emaline's half brother. 10 years old. Loves Luke. Struggling to come to terms with his parents' divorce.

Ivy: Famous documentary maker. Goes to Colby to film a documentary on Clyde. Appears mean but is very nice in the end.

Clyde: Owns the bike shop and the laundromat. Used to be a very famous artist but left NYC to return to Colby.

Joel: Emaline's Biological father, who left when she was little. Was married to Leah but they end up getting divorced.

Leah: Benji's mom.

== Allusions to other books ==
Clyde is a semi important character in the book Along for the Ride. He owns the bike shop and the laundromat mentioned in the novel.

Auden is the main character in Along for the Ride. She and her stepmother Heidi were at Clementine's (Heidi's shop) where Daisy works. Before they got there they also ran into Maggie from the same book (Along for the Ride) – the one Daisy tried to give the flyer to.

Spinnerbait from This Lullaby is playing a gig while Emaline is on a date with Theo.

Wes and Burt from The Truth About Forever are mentioned as cousins with Luke.

"Gerts" bracelets from What Happened to Goodbye are worn by several characters.

Esther from Along For the Ride is the film student who Ivy hires to film the art exhibition.

Benji and his parents briefly stay at the Poseidon, where McLean retreats to in What Happened to Goodbye.
