= The Rest of the Story (novel) =

2019 novel by Sarah Dessen

- First edition
- Author: Sarah Dessen
- Language: English
- Genre: Young adult
- Publisher: Balzer + Bray
- Publication place: United States
- Media type: Print (hardback & paperback) Audiobook E-Book
- ISBN: 978-0062933621

The Rest of the Story is a novel by Sarah Dessen. It was released on June 4, 2019. The novel focuses on Emma Saylor Payne, and her summer with her mother's family, after her summer plans are canceled and her father scrambles to find a solution before he leaves the country. As her only option, she spends the summer with her maternal grandmother, whom she last saw years earlier at her mother's funeral. Over the summer she reconnects with relatives and friends she hadn't seen in years, and learns more about her past and connects the idea of her mother with the truth.

== Plot summary ==
At 17-years-old, Emma Saylor Payne is stuck with nowhere to go after her summer plans fall through and her father, stepmother, and grandmother are all leaving the country. It was decided that she would spend the summer up at North Lake; her mother's childhood home, with her cousins, aunts, and maternal grandmother. Emma Saylor doesn't remember much about her mother, who died when she was ten, but she does remember some of the stories that her mother would tell her about a big lake, and upon arriving at the lake she realizes that her mother's stories don't paint the full picture. There are two communities at the lake; her mother grew up in working-class North Lake, while her father spent the summers in a wealthier Lake North resort.

The more time that Emma Saylor spends at North Lake the more time it feels like she is divided into two people; Emma, who her father has raised and grown to know, and Saylor, the name her mother called her and maternal family has adopted. However, with the help of Roo Price, the boy who was her best friend at four during her first time at the lake she learns more about her past and reconciles her two images of herself.

== Characters ==
=== Major ===
- Emma Saylor Payne: Emma Saylor is the main character of The Rest of the Story.
- Christopher "Roo" Price: A local of North Lake, who was Emma Saylor's childhood best friend. He works 6 different jobs in order to save up for college, between his work he helps Emma Saylor connect to her mother's family and her past. The two end up falling in love.
- Mimi Calvander: The maternal grandmother of Emma Saylor, who primarily calls her Saylor and runs a motel at North Lake.
- Dr. Matthew Payne: Emma Saylor's father who is a dentist and struggles to connect with her after the summer at the lake.

=== Minor ===
- Bridget: Friend of Emma Saylor, who she was supposed to be staying with during the summer but has a family crisis.
- Ryan: Friend of Emma Saylor, who is at theater camp during the summer and falls in love with another girl at camp.
- Nana Payne: The paternal grandmother of Emma Saylor, who she lived with for a time and comes from wealth
- Dr. Tracy Feldman: Emma Saylor's new stepmother who is a dentist.
- Waverly Calvander: Emma Saylor's deceased mother who had struggled with addiction before dying of a heroin overdose.
- Trinity: Emma Saylor's pregnant cousin who works in housekeeping for Mimi Calvander's motel.
- Bailey: Emma Saylor's cousin who becomes her main friend in North Lake who is boy crazy for the guys at the luxurious hotel across the lake in Lake North.
- Jack: Emma Saylor's cousin that looks out for her towards the end.
- Oxford: Emma Saylor's grandfather, Mimi Calavander's husband, who shares the paper every morning with Emma Saylor.

== Themes ==
A major theme in the book is about the topography of people in the vacation towns, after a trip by Dessen to White Lake and the gentrification of the area inspired her. The town that Emma Saylor stays at for the summer is split between North Lake and Lake North, with the locals and less monetarily well off on one side and the new country clubs and more monetarily well off individuals on the other.

Another major theme that is traced throughout the book is about mental health and addiction as Emma Saylor recounts her mother's personal struggles with drugs, alcohol and repeatedly going to rehab, before dying of a heroin overdose when Emma Saylor was 12-years-old. Dessen also brings it up as many of the friends and relatives Emma Saylor meets adhere to the "No Drinking and Boating" Rule and bring up the alcohol based accident that killed Roo's father. Dessen claimed that she was inspired by her concern of a larger showing of younger people in the obituary papers she read and wanted to highlight the "epidemic" of addiction within the United States.
