= Sarah Dessen =

American novelist (born 1970)

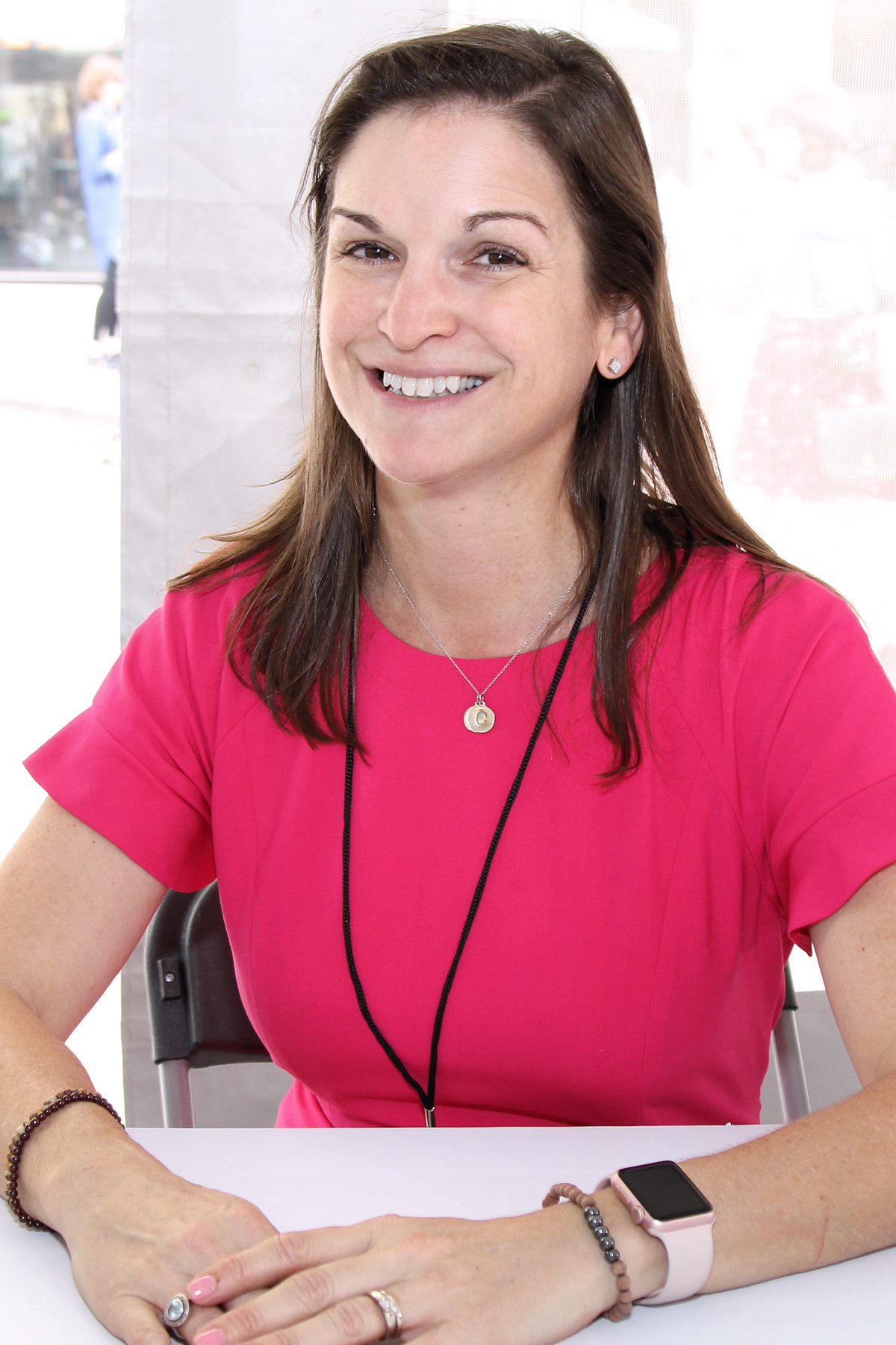
- Dessen at the 2017 Texas Book Festival
- Born: Sarah Dessen; June 6, 1970 (age 56); Evanston, Illinois, U.S.
- Education: University of North Carolina-Chapel Hill
- Occupation: Novelist
- Children: 1
- Writing career
- Period: 1996–present
- Genre: Realistic fiction
- Subject: Young adult literature
- Website: www.sarahdessen.com

Sarah Dessen (born June 6, 1970) is an American novelist known for her contributions to young adult fiction. Her first book, That Summer, was published in 1996, and has since published more than a dozen other novels and novellas. In 2017, Dessen won the Margaret Edwards Award for some of her work, and two of her books were adapted into the 2003 film How to Deal.

== Early life, education and personal life ==
Dessen was born in Evanston, Illinois, on June 6, 1970, to Alan and Cynthia Dessen, who were both professors at the University of North Carolina, teaching Shakespearean literature and classics.

In her adolescence, Dessen has described herself as shy and introverted. In a piece penned for Seventeen, Dessen described a relationship with an older individual during her teenage years and her continual understanding of that experience over time.

Dessen attended Greensboro College in Greensboro, North Carolina, but dropped out before the end of the first semester. Upon moving back home she enrolled at the University of North Carolina-Chapel Hill, to take classes in creative writing, resulting in her graduating with highest honors in 1993.

Today Dessen lives in Chapel Hill, North Carolina, with her husband Jay and daughter Sasha Clementine.

== Career ==
In her early career, Dessen waitressed at the Flying Burrito restaurant in Chapel Hill and was an assistant to Lee Smith. Smith later passed one of Dessen's manuscripts to an agent, helping to launch Dessen's career.

After the 1996 publication of her first book, That Summer, Dessen continued working at the restaurant. Following the publication of Dreamland, Dessen taught at the University of North Carolina- Chapel Hill. She became a full-time writer before the 2006 release of Just Listen.

Dessen's Along for the Ride made the New York Times Best Sellers List in 2009. After its publication, Dessen was referred to as a "best-seller machine".

== Awards and honors ==
Some of her novels have been among the ALA's "Best Fiction for Young Adults" selections: That Summer (1997), Someone Like You (1999), Keeping the Moon (2000), Dreamland (2001), This Lullaby (2003), Just Listen (2007), and Along for the Ride (2010). Someone Like You was also one of the two winners of the 1999 "School Library Journal Best Book" award, and Keeping the Moon was the sole winner the next year.

In 2017, Dessen was awarded the Margaret A. Edwards Award for her novels Dreamland (2001), Keeping the Moon (2000), Just Listen (2007), The Truth About Forever (2004), Along for the Ride (2010), What Happened to Goodbye (2011), and This Lullaby (2002).

== Common Read controversy ==
In November 2019, an Aberdeen News article quoted a comment from 2016 by a Northern State University alumna regarding the University's 'Common Read' program, which identifies books "representing diverse points of view" for undergraduate students to read as part of their curriculum. The student, Brooke Nelson, said she became involved with the program "simply so I could stop them from ever choosing Sarah Dessen." Regarding Dessen's book, Nelson stated, "She’s fine for teen girls, but definitely not up to the level of Common Read."

Dessen posted parts of this interview that were critical of her on Twitter, redacting Nelson's name and the institution but stating that the comments were "mean and cruel”. Her post was supported by a number of authors, including Jodi Picoult, Jennifer Weiner, Siobhan Vivian, Roxane Gay, and N. K. Jemisin. Following this, Northern State University issued an apology for the alumna's comments.

Dessen deleted her tweet. She apologized for her remarks, acknowledging it had resulted in her fans connecting her comments with their source to identify and harass Nelson. This led the former student to delete her social media accounts. Dessen stated, "With a platform and a following, I have a responsibility to be aware of what I put out there." Several of the other authors who had supported Dessen apologized to Nelson, noting they had supported Dessen’s expression of her feelings but did not support the subsequent identification and bullying of Nelson.

== Themes and writing style ==
Young adult literature often addresses complex emotional and social issues reflective of adolescent experiences and development. Dessen's novels have been known for their focus on adolescent identity, personal growth, and complex relationships, especially with families and peers. Her novels typically focus on a female protagonist going through a major transitional period in her life, how she navigates it, and in the process discovering herself. Reviews of her work in Publishers Weekly have noted her consistent exploration of teenage emotional experiences.

In 2017, Dessen was interviewed by Anna Gragert. During the interview, Gragert asked Dessen about the style she uses in some of her books, otherwise known as "effortless perfection". Dessen describes this term as the young girls in her books being able to have friends, look good, be a good student and have one's life together, and to make it look easy. At the start of the book, the reader is supposed to relate with the main characters and throughout their changes in the book, the reader should see that it is okay to not have everything together and not be perfect.

== Bibliography ==
- 1996 – That Summer
- 1998 – Someone Like You
- 1999 – Keeping the Moon (also known as Last Chance)
- 2000 – Dreamland
- 2002 – This Lullaby
- 2004 – The Truth About Forever
- 2006 – Just Listen
- 2008 – Lock and Key
- 2009 – Along for the Ride
- 2010 – Infinity (novella)
- 2011 – What Happened to Goodbye
- 2013 – The Moon and More
- 2015 – Saint Anything
- 2017 – Once and for All
- 2019 –The Rest of the Story
- 2026 – Change of Plans

== Film adaptations ==
The 2003 romantic comedy-drama film How to Deal starring Mandy Moore, Allison Janney, Dylan Baker, Peter Gallagher and Trent Ford was based on both That Summer and Someone Like You.

On May 30, 2019, it was announced that Netflix had purchased the rights to adapt three of Dessen's books into films: This Lullaby, Along for the Ride, and Once and for All. In June 2021, it was announced The Truth About Forever was added to the Dessen books obtained by Netflix to be adapted into a feature film. Along for the Ride was released on May 6, 2022. In July 2023, Dessen shared online that Netflix was no longer moving forward with other adaptations.
