= Jean-Baptiste Andrea =

French film director and screenwriter

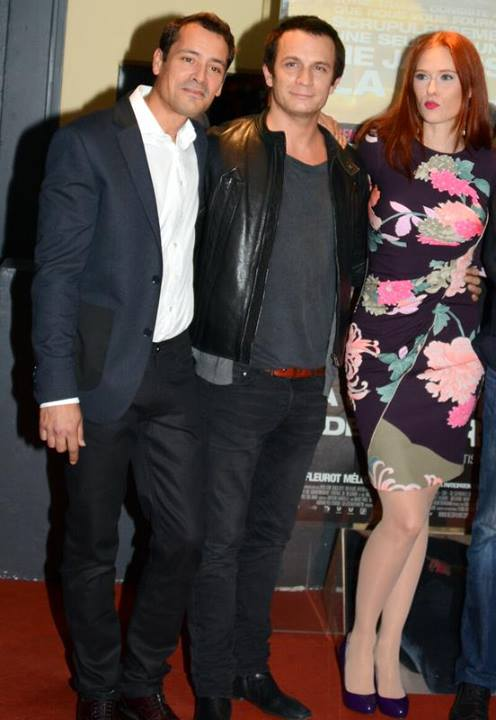
- Jean-Baptiste Andrea (left) with Jérémie Renier and Audrey Fleurot, at a première of La Confrérie des larmes.
- Born: 4 April 1971 (age 55); Saint-Germain-en-Laye, France
- Occupations: Film director, screenwriter

Jean-Baptiste Andrea (born 4 April 1971) is a French novelist, film director and screenwriter.

== Biography ==
He grew up in Cannes, where he started making short films. He later moved to Paris and graduated in political science and economics. In Paris, he met Fabrice Canepa, and the two of them began writing films together. Together, they wrote and directed the cult horror film Dead End.

His debut novel, Ma Reine (My Queen), was published in 2017 and won a dozen awards, including Best French Debut Novel and the Students Femina. His third novel, Des diables et des saints (Devils and Saints), also received multiple awards, including the Grand Prix RTL-Lire, and Watching Over Her obtained the prestigious Prix Goncourt in 2023.

== Bibliography ==
- 2017: Ma Reine
- 2019: A Hundred Million Years and a Day
- 2021: Devils and Saints
- 2023: Watching Over Her

== Filmography ==
- 2021: King (writer)
- 2013: Brotherhood of Tears (writer, director)
- 2007: Hellphone (writer)
- 2006: Big Nothing (writer, director)
- 2003: Dead End (writer, director, with Fabrice Canepa)
- Brighter Than The Sun (music video) - Consumer Republic
- Take The Money and Run (music video) - Trank
