= That Summer (Dessen novel) =

1996 novel by Sarah Dessen

- First edition
- Author: Sarah Dessen
- Language: English
- Genre: Young adult
- Publisher: Orchard Books
- Publication date: October 1996
- Publication place: United States
- Media type: Print (Hardback & Paperback)
- Pages: 198 pp
- ISBN: 053109538X
- OCLC: 34475372
- LC Class: PZ7.D455 Th 1996

That Summer is Sarah Dessen's first novel, published in 1996. This novel and Dessen's Someone Like You are the basis for the film How to Deal.

== Plot summary ==
That Summer tells the story of a 15-year-old girl Haven, as she copes with her sister's engagement, her father's remarriage, and her best friend's personality changes. Nothing seems stable except for Haven's memories—especially those of the summer when Ashley dated Sumner Lee, who, as part of the backstory, is described as bringing the family together. Within the course of the novel, Sumner reappears in Haven's life. Fed up with the drama in her life, Haven runs away. When she doesn't come home, her family searches for her. Ashley finds Haven in the woods, where she tells Haven she had only broken up with Sumner because he had cheated on her, breaking Haven's illusion of their perfect past.

== Characters ==
- Haven McPhail – The protagonist of the novel. She is 15 years old, lanky, grey and nearly six feet tall. She is very insecure about her height. Her summer revolves around two weddings, those of her dad and the weather girl Lorna Queen and her sister Ashley and boring Lewis.
- Mac McPhail – Haven's dad. Cheated on his wife with a younger woman – Lorna Queen – who was also the weather girl on the local news station. He is the sports broadcaster on the same channel. He married Lorna at the beginning of the book. Towards the end of the book, he is having a baby with Lorna.
- Lorna "The Weatherpet" – Haven's dad's new wife. Is a southern belle who is only five years older than Haven's sister Ashley and the weather girl. She is described as very pretty and perky. She marries Mac at the beginning of the book.
- Ashley McPhail/Warsher – Haven's older sister. She is 21 years old and has had many boyfriends. Her husband is Lewis Warsher, a boring man whom she met at the mall. She marries him at the end of the book, having gone through many dramas before.
- Casey Melvin – Haven's best friend. Had gone to 4-H camp before the book and came back a different person. She got herself an older boyfriend, started to smoke and had a bad attitude. After her boyfriend broke up with her, she went back to normal.
- Sumner Lee – Ashley's former boyfriend who gets along well with Haven. He is happy, joyful, always looks on the bright side and always makes Haven feel happy. Works multiple jobs during the day. Haven saw Ashley break up with Sumner but didn't know that he had cheated on her with then Ashley's best friend, Laurel Adams. He was in a commercial for Cheesables while dating Ashley.
- Lydia Catrell – Haven's neighbor. Is a widow and befriended Haven's mom. Has highlighted hair, goes out every Thursday and wants Haven's mom to go to Europe with her.
- Gwendolyn Rogers – A Lakeview model. Is really famous but suffers a nervous breakdown in the book.
- Bert Isker – Manager of Little Feet (where Haven works.) Is old and sometimes scary.
- Lewis Warsher – Ashley's fiancé. Haven finds him boring throughout the story. He is polite and at the end of the book marries Ashley.
