= Dreamland (Dessen novel) =

2000 novel by Sarah Dessen

- First edition
- Author: Sarah Dessen
- Language: English
- Genre: Young adult
- Publisher: Viking Press
- Publication date: September 1, 2000
- Publication place: United States
- Media type: Print (hardback & paperback)
- Pages: 250
- ISBN: 978-0-14-240175-0 (Paperback) 0-670-89122-3 (Hardback)
- OCLC: 55857711

Dreamland (2000) is a teen novel by the American author Sarah Dessen.

== Plot summary ==
The book is split into three parts.

=== Part I: Cass ===
Cassandra, Caitlin's older sister, runs away on Caitlin's birthday. Cassandra's disappearance leaves her family devastated. Before Cass ran away, though, she gave Caitlin a dream journal as a present. Caitlin ends up using it to record her thoughts as if she was talking to Cass. Caitlin's parents are frantic and try to contact people Cass knew. Caitlin and Cass's mother knew that Cass ran away with her boyfriend, Adam, instead of going to Yale. Cass was a high achiever who was popular in school. Caitlin was jealous of her and felt like she was in Cass's shadow. Caitlin was always on the B honor roll while Cass got straight As. In the next few chapters, the school year begins and Caitlin goes to a party with her friends. Work in progress

=== Part II: Rogerson ===
Caitlin and Rogerson's relationship becomes more physical. Rogerson introduces Caitlin to drugs and a woman in her mid-twenties named Corinna. They become best friends and begin to smoke pot.

Caitlin starts skipping school and cheerleading practice so Rogerson won't have to wait for her when he picks her up. He soon begins to be abusive. He hits Caitlin in the face when they're in the car and he is upset with her; a pattern develops where he hits her but only in places covered by clothes. Caitlin begins writing in the gift that she received from Cass, a dream journal. Meanwhile her mother spends every afternoon watching the TV show that Cass's boyfriend works on, and gets occasional glimpses of her daughter.

On Christmas Eve, Caitlin finally agrees to sleep with Rogerson. She says later in the book that whenever they have sex it is the only time she feels safe.

One day, Caitlin's friend, Rina, decides to take her out for some fun. They go to Rina's step fathers' lake house, but Caitlin was terrified because she knew that Rogerson was waiting outside of her house. She tried calling him, but he never picked up the phone.

Caitlin walks away and heads home. She sees Rogerson parked in front of her house. She gets into his car and Rogerson becomes angry with her and begins to abuse her, until she is pushed out of the car. He continues to abuse her until Caitlin's mother shoves Rogerson away from her and calls for help. One of the neighbors calls the police, and Rogerson is arrested.

=== Part III: Me ===
Caitlin joins the Evergreen Rest Care Facility after Rogerson is arrested. She comes in because of drug addiction, and after all Rogerson did to her, she still loved Rogerson. She starts counseling and begins a slow improvement.

Caitlin gets a letter from her friend, Corinna, saying that she left her longtime boyfriend, Dave, and is in Arizona living her life, trying to forget her past. She says she hopes to see Caitlin again soon. She also gets a letter from her sister, Cass, saying that she did not want to go to Yale. She was having a tough time and wasn't happy with her parents' plans for college, which explains her sudden departure. She wanted to be able to do what she wanted to do with her life, and if her parents knew where she was they would try and come get her.

Rina tells Caitlin that she ran into Rogerson at the Quick Zip and he briefly passed by her not saying a word or looking her in the eye. Caitlin realizes that she must prepare herself for the next time she sees Rogerson.

At the end of the book, Caitlin is released but before she goes she takes a picture of the new her, and compares it to the old picture she once ripped but has put back together. Her family has a welcome home party with a special guest, Cass.

== Characters ==
- Caitlin O'Koren – Caitlin is a sixteen-year old high school student whose coming of age is the focus of the novel.
- Rogerson Biscoe – an attractive and charming small-town drug dealer, a rich kid, who is abused by his father and then abuses Caitlin.
- Cassandra "Cass" O'Koren – Caitlin's older sister, who ran away from home on Caitlin's birthday to be with her boyfriend, Adam, instead of going to Yale. She works on a TV show which is similar to The Jerry Springer Show.
- Margaret O'Koren – Cass and Caitlin's mother, a suburban housewife with high hopes for her children. After Cass runs away, she falls into depression.
- Boo and Stuart Connell – the next-door neighbors. Boo is like a second mother to Cass and Caitlin, and their mother's best friend. Stuart is an artist. She and her husband are vegetarian hippies, and in many ways the opposite of their best friends, the O'Korens.
- Rina Swain– Caitlin's best friend, a popular cheerleader.
- Corinna – Caitlin's new friend, whom she met through Rogerson. She lives in a small farm house with her boyfriend, Dave. She attended the same high school as Caitlin and Cass, but was disowned by her parents after running off to be with Dave.

== Allusions to other books ==
- Rogerson is Marshall's roommate in Lock and Key who Ruby mentions was charged with assault.
- Boo Connell is mentioned in Just Listen. Owen's mother and his sister are said to be taking mother-daughter classes run by her.
- Rogerson is mentioned again in Saint Anything when Sydney's mom is planning a get together for the families who are attending the graduation at the Lincoln Correctional facility where her brother Peyton is located.
