= Just Listen (novel) =

2006 novel by Sarah Dessen

- Author: Sarah Dessen
- Language: English
- Genre: Young Adult
- Published: April 6, 2006
- Publisher: Viking
- Publication place: United States
- ISBN: 9780670061051

Just Listen (2006) is a young adult novel written by author Sarah Dessen. It is her seventh published novel.

== Plot summary ==
Annabel Greene is a girl who has it all—at least, that's how it seems on TV commercials. Annabel's life is far from perfect. Her friendship with her best friends Clarke and Sophie ended bitterly. This left her alone and friendless at the beginning of a new school year. Her sister Whitney's eating disorder is weighing down the entire family, and Annabel fears speaking out about her past and her lack of enthusiasm for modeling. Annabel and Clarke were best friends before meeting Sophie. When Sophie joined their friend group, she bullied Clarke about her allergies and not using makeup. One night, Annabel ditched Clarke to hang out with a boy, and Clarke didn't speak to her again. Later on, Annabel was sexually assaulted by Sophie's boyfriend Will Cash. Sophie walked in and thought Annabel was fooling around with Will. In the midst of her isolation, she meets Owen—a music-obsessed, intense classmate who, after taking an anger management class, is determined to tell the truth. With his help, Annabel may start facing her fears—and more importantly, speaking the truth to herself.

== Characters ==
- "Annabel Greene"—The main character of the novel and the youngest of three sisters. She used to be popular, but after a horrific incident at a party, she loses all of her friends and becomes lonely. She is a model, but wants to quit and she has a hard time telling her mother this, who wants her to continue modeling, as she hates confrontation of any kind. She has a habit of not telling the truth so she can try to spare people's feelings. She then meets Owen, and develops a close bond with him. She lets him in, which she doesn't do with any other person. The pair don't speak to one another for two months after a misunderstanding. Only when Annabel comes to tell Owen about her sexual assault and the fact that she will have to speak at a trial to have her rapist convicted does she confront Owen after his radio show one Sunday morning, mending their bond. She confesses what's happened in her life since the party where Will raped her, and he convinces her to testify at the trial. She starts a relationship with him after they share a kiss after the trial.
- "Owen Armstrong"—A music obsessed, broody boy, who is a loner. He loves techno music which Annabel isn't very keen on. He also has a little and very annoying sister, Mallory, who is obsessed with models, including Annabel Greene. He had anger problems in the past which caused him to go to Anger Management classes. He meets and develops a close bond with Annabel Greene, whom he falls in love with. Along the way, he teaches her what is important, and to speak the truth. He also has his own radio show named, incidentally, Anger Management that airs every Sunday morning at seven. Once he discovered that Will raped Annabel he goes to see him where a band he knew Will liked was playing at "just to look at him" but ends up punching him instead; giving him a black eye. Owen, in the end of the novel, starts a relationship with Annabel after explaining why he missed the trial and shares a kiss with her.
- "Sophie Rawlins"—A cruel girl, who was Annabel's best friend for four years. Originally, she was dead-set on being friends with Kirsten, but when that didn't exactly work out she settled for Annabel, figuring she'd have someone to boss around. Annabel chooses Sophie's friendship over Clarke's, who was her best friend prior to Sophie's arrival. Sophie is shown to be bossy, rude, and cruel to people, especially Annabel. She stops being friends with Annabel after thinking she slept with her boyfriend, Will. At the end of the novel, she ends up alone, with no friends and no boyfriend.
- "Whitney Greene"—Annabel and Kirsten's middle sister, who is said to be beautiful, and was also a model. Whitney develops anorexia, weighing down the whole family. She becomes moody and distant but starts redeeming herself at the end of the novel, thanks to her psychiatrist, Moira.
- "Kirsten Greene"—Annabel and Whitney's oldest sister, Kirsten, used to be a model, but quit. She was very rebellious during her teenage years. She and Whitney stop talking to each other, though. Kirsten goes to college and enjoys her classes. She is cheery and bubbly and has a habit of over-talking. However, as the novel reaches its end, she learns to control how much she says.
- "Emily Shuster'"—A girl whom Annabel met at a calendar shoot for Lakeview Models. She later abandons Annabel to be friends with Sophie instead, after Annabel becomes a loner. She too is raped by Will Cash, and, like Annabel, this ends her friendship with Sophie. However, unlike Annabel, she tells authorities about Will and gets Will arrested for second-degree rape.
- "Clarke Reynolds"—A girl who used to be Annabel's best friend, until Annabel chose Sophie over her. Clarke was born in China and was adopted by the Reynolds when she was six months old. Annabel thought Clarke hated her and Clarke thought Annabel hated her. It appears as though Clarke and Rolly are dating since Annabel vaguely introduced them at Bendo's while waiting for the Truth Squad to come onto the stage (who were the band in the book 'This Lullaby'). They repair their friendship at the end of the novel.
- "Will Cash"—Sophie's boyfriend who raped Annabel, Emily, and other unknown girls. Will is arrested after Emily reports him and he winds up in jail. Owen punches him, giving him a black eye, for what he did to Annabel.
- "Mallory Armstrong"—Owen's hyper, pop music and model loving little sister, who adores Annabel because of her modeling abilities and in general. She annoys Owen because of the music she likes. She also dreams of becoming a model.
- "Rolly"—Owen's best friend and Owen's radio show assistant. Later, he becomes Clarke's boyfriend.
- "Grace Greene"—Annabel's mom. She enjoys Annabel's modeling and is clinging on to that part of Annabel's life. Her other daughters, Whitney and Kirsten, had already quit modeling, so Annabel was all she had left. She was heartbroken when Annabel quits at the end of the novel, but then she realizes her daughter is growing up, and she can make her own decisions.
- "Andrew Greene"—Annabel's dad. They would sometimes watch television shows, which he enjoyed, late at night. It was their "tradition".
