= Lock and Key (novel) =

Book by Sarah Dessen

- First edition
- Author: Sarah Dessen
- Language: English
- Genre: Young adult
- Publisher: Viking
- Publication date: April 22, 2008
- Publication place: United States
- Media type: Print (hardback and paperback)
- Pages: 422pp
- ISBN: 978-0-670-01088-2
- OCLC: 159919383
- LC Class: PZ7.D455 Lo 2008

Lock and Key is a novel written by author Sarah Dessen. It is her eighth published novel. It was published by Viking's Children's Books in 2008.

== Plot ==
After her drug and alcohol addicted mother abandons her, child services forces 17-year-old Ruby Cooper to move in with her sister, Cora, who had left for college when Ruby was young. Ruby is upset about this arrangement and continues to wear the key to her old home on a chain around her neck. After learning she will be transferring to a new high school, Ruby attempts to run away but is found out. Nate Cross, Jamie and Cora's next-door neighbor, covers for her. Over the span of the story, Ruby slowly becomes closer to Nate.

As Ruby adjusts to her new life, she learns Cora had not been avoiding her; in fact, Cora had been trying to rescue Ruby from their mother but had always been stopped. Ruby feels overwhelmed with all this, so she skips school to take alcohol and drugs, and later finds herself in Nate's car when he picks her up. Ruby comes home to a furious Jamie, who accuses her for being ungrateful to him and her sister. Having seen resemblances between herself and her mother that night, Ruby becomes determined to change her ways.

One of Nate's clients, a high-strung woman named Harriet, offers Ruby a job at her jewelry store in the mall. Harriet's business booms after a line of key-shaped pendants, inspired by Ruby's necklace, becomes an instant hit. Harriet struggles with a conflict of her own: because of her independence, she is reluctant to form a relationship with Reggie, who owns the kiosk next to her.

Throughout the story, Ruby becomes suspicious about Nate's father, and eventually learns that he abuses Nate. Nate is defensive about this, and that leads to them fighting and breaking up. One day, Cora and Jamie inform Ruby that the police had found her mother unconscious in a hotel room and sent her to a rehabilitation center. Later, Ruby finds out that Nate has run away, but finds him in an apartment room that she and Nate had visited while she was tagging along with him on his job. Ruby drives Nate to the airport when he decides to leave his father to live with his mother. After a sudden realization, she takes the key to the yellow house off its chain, replaces it with the key to Cora and Jamie's house, and hands the necklace to Nate.

At the end of the school year, Ruby gives her English report on the meaning of family. For evidence, she shows two pictures, both of family. The first was of Jamie's huge family, while the second was taken at Ruby's eighteenth birthday party. After trying for months, Cora learns she is finally pregnant, and Ruby is accepted to the same university as Nate. She wants to write a letter to her mother, but not knowing what to say, simply mails a copy of her acceptance letter. At the end of the novel, she stands in the backyard, and as Cora and Jamie are calling for her to leave for her graduation, she takes out the old key to the yellow house from the pocket of her robe and drops it into the koi pond.

== Characters ==
- Ruby Cooper is the protagonist of the story, a seventeen-year-old who was abandoned by her mother. She lived by herself for two months, but is shipped to live with her sister, Cora, who'd left when Ruby was eight, after the government finds out. Ruby is convinced she can take care of herself, but later finds otherwise. She is sarcastic and independent, but changes her cynical worldview as the story develops. She has inherited many physical features from her mother, both described to have pale skin, red hair, and a tall-wiry frame.
- Cora Cooper-Hunter is Ruby's older sister, though they look nothing alike. She left for college when Ruby was eight, and married Jamie Hunter two years later. She tried to keep in contact with Ruby, but her mother continually moved and put fake addresses in Ruby's school records. Cora tries to get pregnant throughout the story. She finds out she is pregnant at the end of the novel. Cora is described to have dark hair and a curvy shape.
- Nate Cross is Jamie and Cora's neighbor. He is a senior, like Ruby, and carpools with her every day. He is constantly helping Ruby when no one else is there for her, although she doesn't think she needs anything from him. Nate works for his father's business "Rest Assured" and is often abused when his dad loses his temper. He was a swimmer, but quit when his father became too involved in it. He is friendly, popular, and optimistic. Nate is described as having blond hair, and being "cute, but in a rich-boy kind of way".
- Jamie Hunter is Cora's wealthy, easygoing, amicable husband. He came from a large family and loves to celebrate festivities. He is the founder of the most popular social networking website UMe and built a pond in his backyard.
- Olivia Davis is Ruby's new friend, who also attended Ruby's old school. She is constantly on her cell phone. She is somehow related to Don Davis, from This Lullaby.
- Gervais Miller is young for his grade, but is one of the smartest kids in school. He carpools with Nate and Ruby and excels in Calculus. He tutors Ruby to become friends with Olivia.
- Blake Cross is Nate's father who founded a service to run errands for people. He owns the house beside Cora and Jamie's. Blake also beats Nate throughout the story and that helps form Ruby and Nate's relationship
- Marshall is a boy from Ruby's old school with whom Ruby had an "arrangement".
- Peyton is Ruby's best friend before Ruby moved away. Ruby later finds out that Marshall was in a relationship with Peyton. Peyton went to private school before she got expelled for possessing drugs on school grounds. She went Jackson High after that, where she met Ruby through her boyfriend.
- Rogerson Biscoe is Marshall's best friend and roommate (also a character from Sarah Dessen's other work Dreamland).
- Laney is Olivia's cousin who throughout the novel trains and takes part in the 5K race, in which she is the last one to finish the race.
- Harriet is a red-haired, hard-working woman who owns a jewelry kiosk at the mall and provides Ruby with a job with great reluctance at first. She drinks too much coffee and shares Ruby's same independence and self-reliance.
- Reggie owns a vitamin kiosk near Harriet's. He and Harriet constantly bicker and tease each other, but it is obvious that he is interested in her.
- Heather Wainwright is Nate's extremely selfless, kindhearted ex-girlfriend. She wanted to help Nate and his problem with his dad, but was turned down every time. Thus, the breakup.

== Motivations ==
Sarah Dessen conducted an interview with the blog The Sarah Dessen Diarist.

RUBY chose abuse and neglect as a key theme as she "...was really interested in taking on a different type of narrator. Most of my girls are from upper middle class families, living in pretty solid environments. I was intrigued by taking a girl who WASN'T like that at all and dropping her into this whole new world. I liked the idea that you'd think it would solve all her problems—having a roof over her head, money, a family—but that it actually brought up a whole other set to deal with. Also, I liked the idea of my narrator having to sort of "save" someone else in order to save herself."

Another key theme was family. It started out with Ruby not knowing the true meaning of family, only thinking that it meant people related by blood or marriage. So in Ruby's mind, the only family she had was her mother and her sister. But by the end of the book, Ruby realized that family is not only relatives, it's everyone who takes care of you, anyone who you trust, anyone who loves you.

The concept of the English project sprung from her want to "...focus on the idea of family, and I thought it would be an interesting way to get Ruby thinking about it without it seeming too forced. Plus I really liked the idea of how everyone would have different definitions for the word, and in giving them, they'd be sort of defining themselves, as well."

The song, Angel of Montgomery, allowed Dessen to "...get down the character of Ruby's mom. There's a certain sadness, and tiredness, in that song, and the woman speaking in it, and it really reminded me of what I was trying to do with Ruby's mom. I often will have a song that brings to mind a character, or helps fill them out a bit."

The interview went into further detail with questions regarding character choices and inspirations for themes.
