= Once and for All (novel) =

2017 novel by Sarah Dessen

- First edition
- Author: Sarah Dessen
- Language: English
- Genre: Romance
- Published: June 6, 2017
- Publisher: Viking Books for Young Readers
- Publication place: United States
- ISBN: 9780425290330

Once and for All is the fourteenth novel by Sarah Dessen. It was published in hardcover on June 6, 2017 and in paperback on May 22, 2018. According to Dessen's website, she was worried she no longer had anything to say after her novel Saint Anything was released in 2015. Surrounded by two people planning weddings and their desire for "wanting things to go perfectly," she felt something needed to be said about the amount of things in our lives we want to go "perfect". And so, Once and for All was written.

== Synopsis ==
Louna, the daughter of famed wedding planner Natalie Barrett, has witnessed countless weddings in unique locations through her mother's wedding-planning business. While working there during her last summer before college, she meets Ambrose, whom she has to drag away from a girl so he can escort his mother down the aisle.

After years of facing brides with cold feet and badly behaved wedding guests, Louna has become skeptical about romance and plans on remaining single. Luckily, the busy wedding schedule provides plenty of legitimate excuses for Louna to avoid meeting potential dates. That changes when satisfying a particularly fussy bridal party requires hiring the bride's brother, Ambrose. He's a lady's man who typically charms more than one potential date during every social gathering. Louna is outwardly dismayed by his antics, but his kind gestures, such as impulsively adopting a rescue dog, begin to win her over. However, Louna was once in love with a boy named Ethan, who she met at a wedding and later spent the night on the beach with him. Ethan was later shot during a school shooting.

== Major theme ==
The main theme in this novel is grief over the tragic loss of a loved one. Louna's love story unfolds in flashbacks tempered by the knowledge that it didn't last. Throughout the novel Louna struggles with the question of whether losing someone is really worth getting to love them. As she tries to move on after losing her first love, her opinions on weddings and romance change. Dessen said in an interview with Publishers Weekly that, "Long-term love has its ups and downs. Life is the light and the dark. Louna is not just grappling with feeling cynical about love itself, but also with her own heart."

== Film adaptation ==
In May 2019, it was announced that the novel was one of three of Dessen's books that were picked up by Netflix to adapt into a feature film.
