= What Happened to Goodbye =

2011 novel by Sarah Dessen

- Author: Sarah Dessen
- Language: English
- Genre: Young adult
- Published: May 10, 2011
- Publisher: Viking Juvenile
- Publication place: United States
- ISBN: 9780670012947

What Happened to Goodbye is a young adult novel by Sarah Dessen. The book chronicles the life of a teenage girl, Mclean, and her journey of self-discovery. The book was released on May 10, 2011, by Viking. It received mainly positive critical reception.

== Plot summary ==
Seventeen-year-old Mclean Sweet and her father, restaurant consultant Gus Sweet, have just moved to Lakeview, their fourth move in two years. Gus is there to turn around a struggling Italian restaurant, Luna Blu, managed by the headstrong Opal, who has worked there since she was a teenager.

As a way of preventing herself from forming attachments, Mclean takes on a different name and persona with each move. In Lakeview, despite her best efforts, Mclean finds herself revealing her true personality, opening up to new people and new experiences. Mclean and her new friends help Opal construct a model of the town and develops an attraction to her neighbor Dave Wade.

After living in Lakeview for a few months, Mclean discovers that Gus has another job offer in Hawaii. While she is trying to cope with the ideas of moving for a fifth time, Mclean's new friends find the various social media profiles she has created for her different personas. Mclean goes to the small beach town of Colby with her mother Katherine. While she is in Colby, Mclean overhears Katherine telling a friend that she thinks that it was a mistake inviting Mclean to come to the beach. Mclean decides to leave her mom's house to go to the Poseidon, an old, worn out motel where she and Katherine stayed on one of their spontaneous beach trips. Confused and in need of a companion, Mclean calls her "two a.m.," the person she knows she can always rely on no matter what: her friend Dave Wade. When Mclean's parents find her at the Poseidon, she tells them about the different personas she has taken on. They realize how hard the divorce is for her and apologize.

When Mclean returns to Lakeview, she finds out her father is dating Opal and Luna Blu is officially closing. Two weeks later, Mclean and her friends have finished the model, and Gus has officially been assigned to the project in Hawaii. Mclean prepares to move back to Tyler with her mother, but Katherine decides she can't take her daughter away from Lakeview and all of her friends. Mclean moves into Opal's spare room and finishes her senior year at Jackson High.

== Characters ==
- Mclean Sweet – The protagonist of the story. Mclean is a senior in high school and is still grieving over her parents' divorce.
- Dave Wade – Mclean's neighbor and later boyfriend, a "boy genius who skipped, like, all of junior high and was taking college courses"
- Gus Sweet – Mclean's father, a restaurant consultant, divorced for two years.
- Katherine Hamilton – Mclean's mother. She wants to connect with Mclean, but Mclean thinks her mother ruined their family by divorcing her father.
- Opal – The manager of Luna Blu
- Deb, Heather, and Ellis – Mclean's new friends from school
- Peter Hamilton – Mclean's stepfather, the new head coach of the Defriese University basketball team.
- Lindsay – A councilwoman in Lakeview, Opal's rival since high school
- Riley Benson – Dave's childhood best friend.
- Maddie and Connor Hamilton – Mclean's twin half siblings

== Major themes ==
A recurring theme in What Happened to Goodbye is the search for self-identity. Seventeen Magazine noted that, "if you're having any pangs of I-don't-know-who-I-am, Mclean's journey might feel both familiar and inspiring to you". YA Reads said that the novel addresses "how important our identities are"

The novel also stresses the importance of family relationships. Pamela Kramer from the Examiner noted that "what the reader learns through Mclean is the importance of family". Galley Smith added that the novel has "many common themes relating to children of divorce and family dynamics".

Another important theme is friendship. One reviewer stated that "working together on an intricate model of the community is a not-so-subtle metaphor for Mclean building an emotional community for herself." Dessen emphasizes friendship throughout the novel by "having the characters reach out to one another to forge genuine relationships".

== Reception ==
What Happened to Goodbye has mostly received positive reviews. The Horn Book Magazine said that Dessen "creates a comfortable space for young adults struggling with identity, relationships, and all that messy family stuff". Los Angeles Times Reviewer Susan Carpenter said Dessen's writing as " remains true to modern adolescence" Seventeen Magazine noted that Dessen's "ability to write about serious issues in an upbeat manner allows teens to relate to situations they face".

Many reviewers praised Dessen's "realistically flawed" characters with "distinct personalities". Melissa DeMoux of the Deseret News said that each character "resonates with the reader". The Los Angeles Times said that Dessen "avoid[s] the usual cliches for such characters," Publishers Weekly commented that "the depth of her well-developed characters grabs readers' attention and leaves them anxious for each new release". Common Sense commended Dessen's "strong supporting cast", though Joceline Farrah of YA Reads disagreed.

Galley Smith commented that "What Happened to Goodbye has some simple plot elements yet still manages to be surprisingly complex". Publishers Weekly also points out that Dessen does not use "complicated dialect".

Karen Elliot of Library School Journal criticized the "slight lack of tension... which keeps it from being truly compelling". Publishers Weekly commented that it has an "emotional punch to a long narrative that doesn't otherwise have much of an arc". Common Sense reviewer Darienne Stewart said that the weak conflict causes the story to ramble in "unnecessary circles," noting that "Dessen often skips backward and forward in the narrative."
