= Ghost Golf =

- Location within California
- 36.81194020080077°N 119.79194437353544°W

Club information
- Location: 5179 N Blackstone Ave; Fresno, California
- Established: 2009 (Concord, California); October 22, 2018 (Fresno, California)
- Type: Public
- Owner: Daryn Coleman
- Tota holes: 18
- Website: http://ghost.golf/

Ghost Golf is a humorous horror-themed indoor miniature golf course and arcade located on North Blackstone Avenue in Fresno, California.

== History and description ==
Ghost Golf was originally a Halloween-inspired display set up in the front yard of the private residence of Daryn Coleman. Tired of having his "one day of glory" a year, he opened a 9-hole course in nearby Concord, California in 2010 on Salvio Street. Approximately four years later, they relocated to a larger 18-hole course in a former Hollywood Video on Clayton Road in Concord, adding a private party room and mummy shooting gallery. The location featured multiple animatronics along the course, including wise-cracking skeletons, a possessed voodoo doll, and a singing skeleton band that performed "Skeletons in my Closet" by The Fat Man and Team Fat.

Although someone started a petition supporting Ghost Golf, their location closed in early 2018 to make room for a flagship Dunkin' Donuts location and two other retail spaces after the landlord raised the rent. The business then re-opened in a larger 10,000-square-foot location, formerly home to No Surrender Lazer Tag, in Fresno near Whitie's Pets on October 22, 2018. They retained the animatronics and graveyard designs from their first two locations while adding an additional party room.

== Lawsuit ==
On October 30, 2020, it was reported that, due to the COVID-19 pandemic in California, Ghost Golf had shut down in March of that year and reopened two months later in June after being given the all-clear by Fresno County. However, they were only open four days before the business was closed again, this time due to Governor Gavin Newsom's pandemic response. According to Coleman, this has cost him $23,000 to $25,000 per month plus rent and other business expenses. Furthermore, Newsom's restrictions abruptly halted his additional plans to open an escape room due to insufficient funds. As a result, Coleman filed a lawsuit against Newsom on October 26, 2020. They were later allowed to re-open at limited capacity in early April 2021 when Fresno County moved to the yellow tier, just over a year since their initial closure in March 2020.
