= Julie Wainwright =

American businesswoman

- Education: Purdue University (BS)
- Known for: Founder of The RealReal

Julie L. Wainwright is an e-commerce entrepreneur. She is the founder and the former CEO of The RealReal, an online marketplace for authenticated luxury consignment.

== Career ==
=== Clorox ===
Early in her career Wainwright began working for The Clorox Company in brand management and computer software.

=== Berkeley Systems ===
By 1996, she had replaced Wes Boyd as CEO of Berkeley Systems where she was instrumental in changing the company's strategy by making it a leading interactive entertainment entity. As president and CEO of the company, she reduced a two-year decline in productivity. She was among one third of the employees that were laid off from Berkeley when the company was sold to CUC in late 1996.

=== Reel.com ===
In March 1998, Wainwright became president and CEO of Reel.com, replacing founder Stuart Skorman. Four months later, Hollywood Video purchased Reel.com "in a deal valued at $100 million." Reel.com was closed in 2000.

=== Pets.com ===
Wainwright was approached by John Hummer of Hummer Winblad Venture Partners to run Pets.com, and was CEO of Pets.com when it ceased operations 268 days after its initial stock offering — "one of the shortest-lived public companies on record" according to Kirk Cheyfitz, author of Thinking Inside the Box: The 12 Timeless Rules for Managing a Successful Business. After shutting Pets.com in November 2000, her husband sought a divorce. Wainwright said that this was a very difficult time in her life: "I had two major life crises in the same week, one public and one private, that sent me on a journey of self-discovery and healing I couldn’t have anticipated."

=== The RealReal ===
Wainwright founded The RealReal in 2011, and the company shipped its first orders in June of that year. In a 2015 article, Forbes gave The RealReal a FORBES-estimated valuation of $300 million saying “the startup is in a much better place than Pets.com ever was.” By December 2017, The RealReal employed 950 people. The company's focus on sustainability led to its becoming the first luxury member of the Ellen MacArthur Foundation's CE100 USA.

In early 2019 The RealReal announced it would be adding an additional half-million square feet of e-commerce center space in Perth Amboy, New Jersey to its existing e-commerce centers in Secaucus, New Jersey and Brisbane, California. Wainwright was mentioned on CNBC in a report about the company's authentication process. In early 2020, TheRealReal was sued by investors in a class action lawsuit in connection with alleged securities laws violations stemming from TheRealReal's initial public offering.

On June 22, 2022, The RealReal announced that its founder and CEO Julie Wainwright had stepped down.

=== Advisory Roles ===
Wainwright is an advisor to Springboard Enterprises’ New York Fashion Tech Lab and Purdue University's Krannert School of Management. She has been a board member of the Headlands Center for the Arts, Magic Theatre and San Francisco Art Institute.

== Recognition ==
In 2019, Wainwright received the Parsons Table Award. In 2018 Wainwright was included in Inc.’s Female Founders 100 list, Entrepreneur’s 50 Most Daring Entrepreneurs and Fast Company’s Most Creative People In Business. In 2017, The RealReal received the award for Best-Performing Company in the small-cap category from WWD. She has been included in the Business of Fashion’s BoF500 for both 2016 and 2017, Vanity Fair’s New Establishment list 2017, and Forbes 40 over 40. In 2016, Wainwright accepted the Fashion Group International’s award for Innovation in Retail e-Commerce on behalf of The RealReal and won Springboard Enterprises’ Northstar Award. The San Francisco Business Times recognized Wainwright as one of the most-admired CEOs of the year in 2014, and again in 2017 as one of the most influential women of the year.

Wainwright was selected for the inaugural 2021 Forbes 50 Over 50; made up of entrepreneurs, leaders, scientists and creators who are over the age of 50.

== See also ==
- Recommerce
- Sukhinder Singh Cassidy
- Tradesy
