= Datacasting =

Broadcasting of data over a wide area

Datacasting (data broadcasting) is the transmission of data over a wide area using radio waves. It typically refers to supplemental information sent by television stations alongside digital terrestrial television (DTT) signals. However, datacasting can also be applied to digital data signals carried on analog TV or radio broadcasts.

== Overview ==
Datacasting often provides a variety of information such as news, weather forecasting, traffic reporting, stock market updates, and other data that may or may not relate to the broadcast programs. It can also include interactive elements like gaming, shopping, or educational content. An electronic program guide is typically included, though this feature is sometimes considered inherent to the digital broadcast standard.

The ATSC, DVB, and ISDB standards support broadband datacasting via Digital Terrestrial Television (DTT), although the specifics of implementation are not always defined. For analog TV, moderate and low bandwidths are used via overscan and the Vertical Blanking Interval (VBI), respectively. DirectBand and RDS/RBDS are medium and narrow subcarriers used for analog FM radio. The EUREKA 147 and HD Radio standards both allow for datacasting on digital radio, defining a few basics but also allowing for later expansion.

The term IP Datacasting (IPDC) is used in DVB-H for the technical elements required to send IP packets over DVB-H broadband downstream channel combined with a return channel over a mobile communications network such as GPRS or UMTS. The set of specifications for IP Datacast (phase1) was approved by the DVB project in October 2005.

== Datacasting services around the world ==
=== North America ===
==== Ambient Information Network ====
Ambient Information Network, a datacasting network owned by Ambient Devices presently hosted by U.S.A. Mobility, a U.S. paging service which focuses on information of interest to the local (or larger) area, such as weather and stock indices, and personalized information will be provided with a paid ambient subscription on that particular device.

==== RBDS ====
A slight variation of the European Radio Data System, RBDS is carried on a 57 kHz subcarrier on FM radio stations. While originally intended for program-associated data, it can also be used for datacasting purposes including paging and dGPS.

==== DirectBand ====
DirectBand, owned by Microsoft, uses the 67.65 kHz subcarrier leased from FM radio stations. This subcarrier delivers about 12 kbit/s (net after error correction) of data per station, for over 100 MB per day per city. Data includes traffic, sports, weather, stocks, news, movie times, calendar appointments, and local time.

==== MovieBeam ====
The now-defunct MovieBeam service used dNTSC technology by Dotcast to transmit 720p HDTV movies in the lower vestigial sideband of NTSC analog TV. The set-top box stored the movies to be viewed on demand for a fee. This was distributed through PBS's National Datacast.

==== TV Guide On Screen ====
TV Guide On Screen is an advertising-supported datacast sent by one local station in each media market. It supplements or replaces the limited electronic program guide sent by each TV station, which is already mandated by the U.S. Federal Communications Commission (FCC).

==== ATSC-M/H ====
ATSC-M/H is yet another mobile TV standard, although it is transmitted and controlled by the broadcasters instead of a third party, and is therefore mostly free-to-air (although it can also be subscription-based). From a technical standpoint, it is an IP-encapsulated datacast of MPEG-4 streaming video, alongside the ATSC MPEG transport stream used for terrestrial television broadcasting. Heavy error correction, separate from that native to ATSC, compensates for ATSC's poor mobile (and often fixed) reception.

==== Qterics ====
Qterics (formerly Broadcast Data Corporation and later UpdateLogic Incorporated's UpdateTV) is a service used by some brands of TV sets and other ATSC tuners to update their firmware via over-the-air programming. This is also transmitted on PBS stations via National Datacast.

=== Australia ===
Australian broadcast infrastructure company Broadcast Australia undertook a three-year trial in Sydney of a datacasting service using the DVB-T system for use in Australia.

The trial consisted of a number of services on one standard 7 MHz multiplex, collectively known as Digital Forty Four.

The collection included:

- A combined program guide for the free-to-air broadcasters (Channel 4)
- ABC news, sport, and weather items (Channel 41)
- Channel NSW (link) Government and Public Information, including real time traffic information and life surf webcam images (Channel 45)
- Australian Christian Channel (Channel 46)
- Expo Home Shopping (Channel 49) and
- Federal parliamentary audio broadcasts.

More recently a near-Australia wide broadcast of a datacasting channel called MyTalk commenced on April 13, 2007. Broadcasting as part of the multiplex on Southern Cross and Southern Cross Ten stations, it provided news, weather and other information, available free to anyone able to tune in. The stream consisted of text applicable to the viewer's location and a 4:3 video window of terrestrial TV from the relevant Southern Cross/Southern Cross Ten station.

On February 25, 2008, MyTalk ceased broadcasting. Digital Forty Four was shut down at exactly midnight on the night of April 30, 2010.

=== Malaysia ===
Malaysian multi-channel pay-TV operator, MiTV Corporation Sdn Bhd launched its IP-over-UHF service in September 2005. The full digital broadcast capacity was used to deliver IP services which such as multicast streaming and datacasting.

=== Middle East ===
Toosheh, or "Knapsack" in Persian is a datacasting technology that uses existing set-top-boxes for reception of files without requiring an Internet connection. No special equipment is required, the transmission is in the form of a standard video stream containing embedded data that is 'recorded' to a USB stick and then viewed using special software on a PC.

=== South Africa ===
Mindset Network has developed an IP satellite datacast platform for the distribution of educational and health content, to sites around South Africa and the rest of Africa as well. The model is a forward and store model, allowing users of the platform to view content in an on-demand fashion. Content distributed in this way includes video content, print-based content (in the form of PDF files), and interactive computer-based multimedia content.

Significantly, the model also includes access to a GPRS network that allows the receiving sites to communicate back to the Mindset central server. Communications include statistics about the physical health of the machine (e.g. power status, disk drive usage), as well as usage statistics indicating what content has been viewed.

The model also includes a distributed deployment of the Moodle LMS, allowing users to take assessments and have the results transmitted via GPRS to the Mindset server for accreditation.

=== United Kingdom ===
Teletext was used extensively on analogue channels; a type of datacasting using the overscan on analogue transmissions. Teletext Limited and Ceefax were the main providers. Within digital terrestrial television, the Digital Teletext name is used extensively although the technology used to provide this service is unrelated and uses the MHEG-5 UK profile.

=== Worldwide ===
==== Blockstream Satellite ====
Blockstream Satellite broadcasts the Bitcoin blockchain via a global network of broadcast satellites. It also gives everyone the ability to transmit arbitrary files at low cost which can be received in total anonymity worldwide by anyone with a standard DVB-S2 receiver card or USB adapter.

==== Outernet ====
Outernet's goal is to provide free access to content from the web through geostationary and Low Earth orbit satellites, made available effectively to all parts of the world. The project uses datacasting and User Datagram Protocol (UDP) through both small satellites, such as CubeSats, and larger, more conventional geostationary communications satellites in a satellite constellation network. Wi-Fi enabled devices would communicate with the satellite hotspots, which receive data broadcasts from satellites.

== Advantages over Internet transmission ==
Datacasting has certain advantages over using the Internet, specifically concerning privacy and censorship resistance, which can be considered important in an era of mass surveillance.

Both satellite and terrestrial broadcast multiplexes can carry multicast IP data. This can be forwarded onto a LAN with a suitable receiver, such as a low-cost set-top-box running custom firmware. The software to transmit web pages over multicast is fairly easy to implement; some of the technology has been already developed. Content received can be stored automatically on the set-top box's built in hard drive, served to users over Wi-Fi or Ethernet. A fractional broadcast multiplex can transmit up to hundreds of gigabytes of content each day.

=== Privacy ===
In extreme cases a receiver can be physically disconnected from the Internet, thus providing a system much more secure than Internet-based anonymity networks such as Tor. This could ultimately put a complete stop to law enforcement attempts to censor material on the darknet and making many censorship laws virtually impossible to enforce; thus restoring some of the 'anarchic freedom' of the early days of the Internet.

=== Censorship ===
It is much more difficult, on a technical and political level to jam a satellite signal compared to blocking a website. Data streams can be transmitted alongside television channels. An attempt to jam the data stream will end up jamming the TV stations as well.

=== Efficiency ===
Despite the very high cost of satellite bandwidth, broadcasting to hundreds of thousands or millions of receivers may well be cheaper than using the Internet. No build-out and maintenance of costly physical infrastructure (e.g. fiber optic cables) is required for the end-user, only a satellite dish or TV antenna is necessary, allowing services such as educational materials to be delivered to underserved communities.

== See also ==
- Interactive television
- DVB-H
- Multimedia home platform
- UDcast
- MPEG Multiprotocol encapsulation
- MPEG Unidirectional Lightweight Encapsulation
- Satellaview
- Digicas
