= Mindset Network =

Liberty Learn
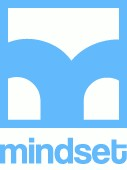
- Country: South Africa

Programming
- Language(s): English
- Picture format: 16:9 (576i SDTV); 16:9 (1080i HDTV)

Ownership
- Owner: Mindset Network; Liberty
- Sister channels: Mindset Pop (Pop Primary)(ended 10 December 2020)

History
- Launched: 2003
- Former names: Mindset (2003-2023)

Liberty Learn, formerly known as Mindset Network, is an African educational technology and media NGO nonprofit organization and a digital satellite television free-to air channel launched in 2003. Working across Africa. It was launched to educate and improve health in South Africa, uplift and empower communities with various Educational and Health initiatives and interventions. The organisation works with Government, international donors and blue-chip corporations to deliver sustainable and practical change to the developmental challenges that communities face. It develops, sources, distributes and uses digital content. Its multimedia content is distributed via broadcast television, IP based satellite datacast, the web, distributable media (hard drives, DVDs and CDs) and mobile networks. From 1 April 2020, MultiChoice launched a second channel Mindset Pop (Pop Primary) in South Africa and across Africa catering to Grade 4–9 with a lineup of programming for Grade R-3. As of 10 December 2020, the pop up channel will come to an end and no longer be available on its platform, but remained its original Mindset channel.

In June 2023, it was announced that the channel will rebrand into Liberty Learn which is a joint venture with Liberty.

"Education is the most powerful weapon we can use to change the world and Mindset Network is a powerful part of that world changing arsenal"

— Extract of Nelson Mandela's "Lighting Your Way to a Better Future" speech at the launch of the Mindset Network

== Programmes ==
Mindset currently has programmes divided into six categories: Learn, Life, Play, Health, Connect and ECD. Mindset is developing a Livelihoods channel for developing the skills of out-of-school youth.

=== Learn ===
Mindset Learn, the original category, is for Grades 8 to 12 at South African high schools. Most programming is recorded played on the channel and readily available to stream on the Mindset App. Archive footage and show notes is available to watch and download on the Mindset Learn website. Schools which use the Smart Technologies's Smart Board have preloaded videos and show notes. The programs covers subjects like Mathematics, Physical Science, Life Science, Geography, Economics, Business Studies, Accounting, English, and Information Technology.

=== ECD ===
Early Childhood Development (previously Mindset Cabanga), with support from USAID, is a programme for preschoolers and primary school children covering numeracy, spelling, cartoons and story times, all under the title 'Big School', mathematics, natural science and technology.

=== Health ===
Mindset Health is about treating HIV/AIDS and other health issues with shows such as MTV Shuga. The programme reaches patients in clinic and hospitals providers, rooms, and health care providers.

=== Life ===
Mindset life displays content outside the curriculum and is mostly infotainment. Most of these shows are taken from the SABC archives.

=== Play ===
Showcases sport highlights and docu-series such as The Immortals.

=== Connect ===
Programming related to science and technology such as The Big Idea and Dream The Future.

== Sister channels ==
Mindset Pop
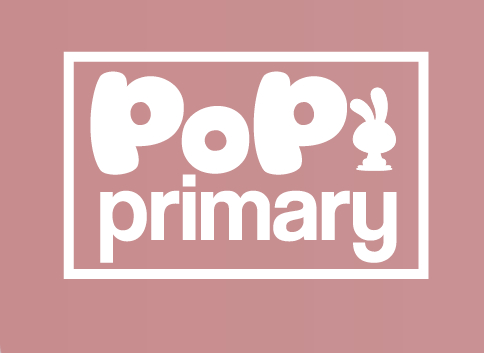
- Country: South Africa
- Network: Mindset Network

Programming
- Language(s): English
- Picture format: 16:9 (576i SDTV); 16:9 (1080i HDTV)

Ownership
- Sister channels: Mindset Network

History
- Launched: 1 April 2020
- Closed: 6 December 2020

In April 2020, MultiChoice partnered up with Mindset Network to launch a pop-up channel, Mindset Pop catered towards Grade 4-9 with programs from Grade 1-3. The channel was discontinued by 10 Development with content airing on the main channel.

The channel can also be referred to as Mindset Pop Primary and Pop Primary.
