= Video Update =

American video rental store chain

- Type: Public
- Traded as: Nasdaq: VUPDA
- Industry: Retail
- Founded: 1982; 44 years ago, in St. Paul, Minnesota, United States
- Founder: Daniel Potter; John Bedard
- Defunct: December 2001; 24 years ago
- Fate: Bought out of bankruptcy by Movie Gallery
- Headquarters: Minnesota World Trade Center, St. Paul, Minnesota, United States
- Website: VideoUpdate.com (archive)

Video Update was an American chain of movie rental stores. Founded in Minnesota in 1982, the company remained small until after going public in 1994, when it began expanding aggressively, primarily by acquisitions. The last of these, a 1998 merger with the South Carolina–based Moovies chain, made the company the third-largest in the video rental space behind Blockbuster and Hollywood Video, at one point boasting more than 700 stores. It also saddled the company with debt and created management problems just as the industry experienced a downturn. A wave of closures and payment difficulties with vendors and lenders led to a Chapter 11 bankruptcy filing in 2000 and a purchase of its U.S. and Canadian stores by Movie Gallery the next year. The name survived on at least one franchised store until 2012.

== Early years and rapid growth ==
Video Update was founded in St. Paul, Minnesota, in 1982, by Daniel Potter and John Bedard. Potter and Bedard, who met in law school and shared a love of movies, opened the first store the year before on Rice Street in Little Canada, living in the basement. The first franchises, all owned by law school students while they were in school, opened in 1983; at that time, the chain adopted the Video Update name. In 1985, Video Update began planning its expansion into Singapore; the company planned to open 50 stores in the country in next two years, but by 1986, the number of future stores in the country was reported to be only 15 to 20. In its early years, Video Update was primarily a franchise business; by February 1986, there were 91 units in the U.S., 41 of them in the Minneapolis–Saint Paul area. However, an attempt to take distribution in-house was not well-received by the film studios and generated cash flow problems: the company's net worth turned negative, creditors and the Internal Revenue Service sought money, and the Minnesota Department of Commerce restricted the company's ability to sell additional franchises in the state. In 1986, the company moved its offices from Maplewood, Minnesota, to the 31st floor of the Minnesota World Trade Center office tower. The first company-owned store opened in 1989.

Video Update completed an initial public offering (IPO) and began trading on the Nasdaq on July 20, 1994. It was one of three movie rental chains to go public within two years, the others being Hollywood Video parent Hollywood Entertainment and Movie Gallery. At the time, Video Update had 45 stores. The IPO gave Video Update the equity it needed to appeal to developers leasing space in new shopping centers and to begin expanding by acquisition; it was followed by two additional public offerings and a sale of warrants before December 1996. Between 1995 and 1997 the company acquired 28 Video Powerstores in Arizona and Nevada; the 10-store Indy Video chain in metropolitan Indianapolis; and seven Cox Video stores in Oklahoma and Texas. Video Update expanded into Canada by acquiring the 51-unit Wilderness Video Group of Vancouver; 94 Video West, which owned 12 Canadian video stores and two in Alaska; and the 23-store Video View chain in Alberta. The Wilderness acquisition immediately made Video Update the third-largest video rental company in Canada. Potter gained a reputation as a tough negotiator in acquiring smaller players. Analysts looked at Video Update favorably because its management was seen as strong and its investment into stores, particularly decorations, was minimal compared to the largest players, Blockbuster and Hollywood Video. In the year ending April 1997, Video Update added 145 stores to bring its total to 340.

== Purchase of Moovies ==
Around this time, all the regional companies were going public: West Coast, Video Update, Moovies, Movie Gallery. It was a race to be No. 3 behind Blockbuster and Hollywood. And the only way they could keep their stock price up was by acquisition.

— Chris Klapheke, video store operator, Louisville, Kentucky, on the situation in the mid-1990s

In October 1996, Video Update began negotiating for its largest acquisition: Moovies, a 269-store chain based in Greenville, South Carolina. Moovies, the fastest-growing company based in South Carolina at the time, had also expanded rapidly; it grew from eight stores in 1992 to 272 by 1997 and had only recently gone public itself. Potter hoped that the combination of Video Update and Moovies would be large enough to induce the movie studios to enter into revenue-sharing agreements with the chain, much as they had with Blockbuster. When the original deal was announced in July 1997, Moovies stockholders were to receive 1.1 shares of Video Update for every share of Moovies. The transaction took place amid a challenging market for video rentals in 1997; good weather and indications of shifting viewer habits were cited, as was a lack of major hit movies. In 1997, both companies faced steep drops in their stock prices: Moovies fell 79 percent and Video Update 46 percent. Potter, sensing an opening, sought a better deal than the original transaction; in October 1997, the stock swap was amended to 0.75 shares of Video Update for every share of Moovies. This decision caused merger talks to extend to March 1998, which Jim McCartney of the St. Paul Pioneer Press called a "harmful distraction" to both companies. Additionally, Video Update's chief financial officer resigned during the merger, apparently in objection to a financial statement.

When the Moovies deal was completed, it brought Video Update to 685 stores, the third-largest in the nation behind Blockbuster and Hollywood. The company spent $7 million to replace Moovies signage in the acquired stores with its own. Moovies, with its locations more concentrated in small towns than metropolitan areas, never properly integrated with Video Update; it had been neglected in the months leading up to the merger, with Potter saying that Moovies executives had "checked out" when the original deal was agreed. The company curtailed expansion plans in markets like Dallas–Fort Worth, in part because of the Moovies merger and in part to focus on existing locations.

The combined company also inherited several legal headaches. In 1998, Video Update and Rentrak sued each other after Video Update alleged that Rentrak forced it into buying new releases from the company as part of buying Moovies. The next year, a jury found that Video Update's buyout of the contract of the former Moovies chief operating officer was fraudulent and awarded him $1.3 million. Another lawsuit alleged Potter failed to disclose financial information to stockholders.

== Financial troubles and bankruptcy ==
Video Update swung from a $5 million profit for the year ending in April 1997 to losses of $14 million and $110 million in each of the next two years, and in fiscal year 1998–1999, it closed more stores than it opened. By August 1999, there were 707 company-owned and franchised stores, though it planned to close another 70 stores, mostly in the Southeast, by May 2000. The stock was delisted from Nasdaq after shareholders blocked a planned reverse stock split that would have met the exchange's listing requirements by keeping its share price above $1. The company was also accumulating creditors. Allen Industries—a sign manufacturer in Greensboro, North Carolina, which had been hired to change out signage on many of the stores acquired from Moovies—sued Video Update, which contended the company did shoddy work and refused to pay. Allen responded by placing liens on Video Update stores in eight states, including North Carolina, and it had sheriff's deputies seize and temporarily close four North Carolina locations.

In mid-2000, Video Update struggled to meet a payment deadline for part of the loan that had allowed the firm to buy Moovies. Potter secured agreement from 14 of the 15 lenders involved to amend the terms of the loan, but one lender—Fleet Bank—held out, apparently skeptical of the video rental industry's prospects. Fleet's refusal to amend the terms prompted a default on the loan, as well as a going concern warning from auditor Deloitte Touche and increasing demand for prompt payments from vendors, and was credited by Potter with forcing the company into Chapter 11 bankruptcy on September 18, 2000. The company's stock had declined 99.3 percent from its all-time high in August 1995 and was trading at seven cents a share; the bankruptcy filing estimated more than 1,000 creditors, with distributors Ingram Entertainment, Warner Home Video, and St. Louis Sight and Sound among the largest unsecured creditors. Ingram had previously been given equity in the company in exchange for continuing to supply it with product. St. Louis Sight and Sound, suddenly faced with a bill it was unlikely to collect, soon shuttered its doors. The bankruptcy did not include the Canadian division.

In bankruptcy, senior management made a proposal for their retention, to which the lenders—particularly Banque Paribas—objected, claiming it unjustly enriched top executives, something the company had been known for in the past. In January 2001, Bedard departed; company insiders noted the two were somewhat rivalrous and, at one point, a former employee claimed to have seen Potter and Bedard wrestling on the office floor. The company struggled to boost flagging morale and combat a rise in theft by employees at Video Update stores. Meanwhile, two waves of closings trimmed the chain's 450 U.S. stores to 260.

== Disposition ==
Movie Gallery acquired Video Update's senior secured bank debt at a steep discount in March 2001; the company, in a release, noted that this would give it "the opportunity of participating in the reorganization of Video Update and ... input in the disposition of each of the Video Update stores". Two parties objected: a 23-unit franchisee that owned stores on the Virginia Peninsula and in New Hampshire was uncertain how Movie Gallery would handle franchisees, and a secured creditor disputed the money it was to be paid. The bankruptcy court approved the company's sale to Movie Gallery in December 2001; this included the stores in Canada, a new market for Movie Gallery. After the purchase, in releasing Video Update's final financial statements, Movie Gallery warned that the company lacked "certain internal accounting and management controls" in the lead-up to and during its bankruptcy. It had previously noted that officers of Video Update may have engaged in embezzlement and fraud.

Franchised stores had varying fates. The Virginia and New Hampshire franchisee failed to reach an agreement with Movie Gallery; because Movie Gallery acquired the Video Update name, this resulted in the rebranding of the stores. In 2012, the last store bearing the Video Update name, a franchise in Eagan, Minnesota, closed; its owners had negotiated a lifetime franchise when Video Update filed for bankruptcy.
