= GameCrazy =

Defunct US video game rental chain (1998–2010)

- Final GameCrazy logo, used until 2010
- Type: Subsidiary
- Industry: Video game
- Founded: 1998; 28 years ago
- Defunct: July 31, 2010; 16 years ago (United States); August 8, 2010; 16 years ago (Canada)
- Fate: Chapter 7 bankruptcy Liquidation sale
- Headquarters: Wilsonville, Oregon, U.S.
- Parent: Hollywood Video
- Website: gamecrazy.com

GameCrazy was a video game rental shop based in Wilsonville, Oregon. It was a subsidiary of Movie Gallery. The stores were often, but not always, located adjacent to Hollywood Video stores.

GameCrazy and its parent company, Movie Gallery, filed for bankruptcy in May 2010.

== History ==
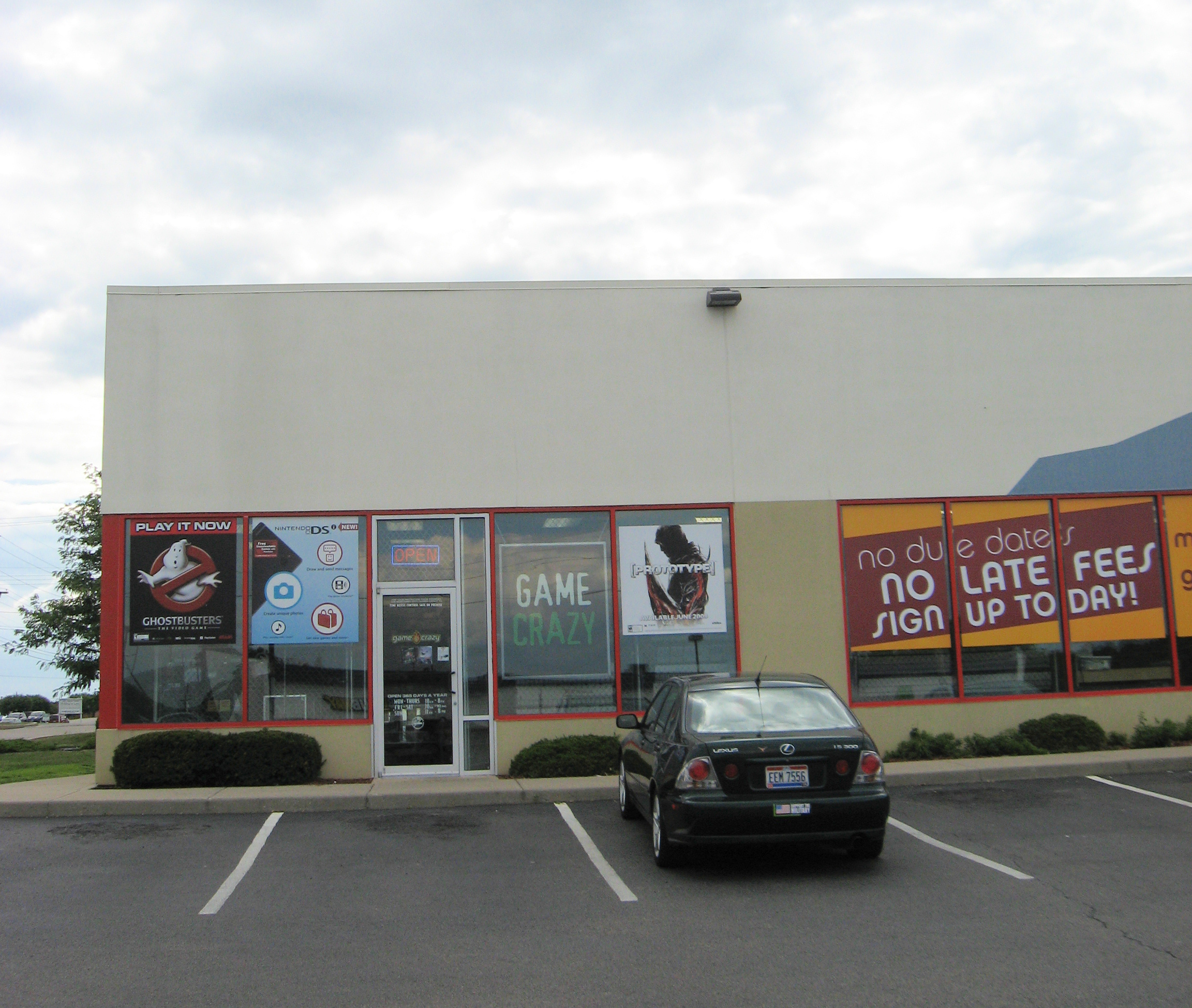
GameCrazy attached to a Hollywood Video store

In 1999, to compete in a growing video game market, Hollywood Entertainment launched a store-within-a-store concept called GameCrazy. It featured the ability to buy, sell, and trade video games, systems, and accessories inside of Hollywood Video stores. Each respective location offered video games for all "next generation" platforms in both new and used conditions. Select locations offered products for older systems such as the NES and Sega Genesis. GameCrazy enabled customers to play a particular title, new or used, prior to purchase. This "try before you buy" option was a staple GameCrazy policy.

Movie Gallery launched a similar store-within-a-store initiative called Game Zone. These stores were developed and implemented for use within Movie Gallery locations while GameCrazy was generally used within Hollywood Video stores. While many locations operated these areas as completely separate brands (i.e. Both Game Zone / GameCrazy operated with segregated staff and management), others operated using a single unified staff. While the majority of GameCrazy stores were located within their respective rental partner, the company did expand their chain to include standalone GameCrazy stores.

As of December 31, 2006, there were 634 GameCrazy locations which were generally located within the same building as Hollywood Video. The construction of standalone "concept stores" were ongoing at the time of the chain's closure, the most recent being opened in Las Vegas, Nevada. GameCrazy contributed 13% to Movie Gallery's revenue for 2006, with 70% of its revenue coming from new and used software and 30% from new and used hardware products. GameCrazy competed with both other specialty retail video game stores, such as GameStop and the fast-growing video game franchise, Play N Trade, as well as big box retailers such as Target, Walmart, and Best Buy.

== Downfall ==
The company began having financial difficulties despite its major efforts to respond to business challenges. In October 2007, Movie Gallery filed for Chapter 11 bankruptcy protection under the U.S. Bankruptcy code. Because of these troubles, the stock price fell below $1 per share and was no longer listed on the NASDAQ stock exchange in November 2007.

On September 28, 2009, Wilsonville, Oregon based Movie Gallery, which owned GameCrazy, announced it would close 200 of its 680 stores by the end of October 2009 due to financial problems brought on from the failing video stores.

Movie Gallery's stock price fell from $1.25 at close in October 2009 to $.05 at close in December 2009, and many locations fell behind on rent. As a result, the company hired restructuring firm Moelis & Company, giving it a 60-day grace period to negotiate with lenders and landlords. But it was forced into bankruptcy a second time in February 2010.

During a company-wide conference call on April 30, 2010, it was announced that all U.S. Hollywood Video, Movie Gallery, and GameCrazy stores would file for Chapter 7 bankruptcy in May 2010 and wind down business. Analysts generally believe that Movie Gallery & Hollywood Video's unprofitability, caused by competition from Blockbuster Inc. and online retailers such as Netflix and Redbox, was one of the major factors in the company's decision to close the retail chain.

As of December 15, 2011, the GameCrazy.com site has been relaunched as a gaming blog, but has ceased to update since late October 2014.

== Store information ==
As a video game specialty store, GameCrazy dealt primarily in new and used video game related products such as consoles, accessories, and games. Remuneration for video game and accessory trade-ins was provided in the form of cash or store credit. Consoles were provided with a credit value as cash was not given for previously used video game systems. Noteworthy was the GameCrazy price matching policy whereby the retailer would generally exceed the trade-in value offered by a physical retailer and/or competitor by 5%.

Midnight launches for highly anticipated titles were common but not compulsory.

GameCrazy instituted a "Wishlist" and "Special Order" feature which allowed the gamer the ability to procure elusive video game related product. The wish list notified the staff once a desired product had been traded in by flagging that particular item in the Point of Sale (POS) System. For immediate action, a special order could be placed where the desired item was shipped from the nearest GameCrazy to the consumer's local store.

The Most Valuable Player (MVP) was a service offered by GameCrazy which provided customers with a 10% discount on used games and accessories as well as a 10% increase in video game trade-in value. Most recently, GameCrazy launched an upgraded discount card called MVP Plus. This not only provided the 10% discount on used games and accessories, but also could be used at other businesses. It also provided a 5% cash back incentive to a member, through the MVP Plus login website, where a form was printed out, and relevant purchase receipts were mailed off. The card member then received a check in the mail for the 5% cash back. There was a yearly fee to carry this card.

Competitors with a similar business model include GameStop and their subsidiary EB Games, which also specialize in new and used video games. In addition to customer trade-ins, the store sold used games once offered for rental in Hollywood Video stores.

== See also ==
- List of companies based in Oregon
