= TVSN =

Australian and New Zealand home shopping television network owned by Direct Group

- Type: Home shopping
- Country: Australia
- Broadcast area: Australia; New Zealand; Indonesia; Papua Guiena
- Network: Seven Network (free-to-air); Foxtel (pay television)
- Headquarters: Frenchs Forest, Australia

Programming
- Language: English
- Picture format: 576i (SDTV) 16:9

Ownership
- Owner: Direct Group Pty Ltd
- Sister channels: On pay television; Expo Channel; On free-to-air; Channel 7; 7HD; 7two; 7mate; 7flix; 7Bravo; Racing.com

History
- Launched: 4 December 1995; 30 years ago (pay television); 24 September 2012; 14 years ago (free-to-air)
- Closed: 15 November 2026; 2 days ago
- Former names: The Value Channel

Links
- Website: tvsn.com.au tvsn.co.nz

Availability

Terrestrial
- ATN Sydney (DVB-T): 1321 @ 6 (177.5 MHz)
- HSV Melbourne (DVB-T): 1337 @ 6 (177.5 MHz)
- BTQ Brisbane/Gold Coast (DVB-T): 1353 @ 6 (177.5 MHz)
- SAS Adelaide (DVB-T): 1369 @ 6 (177.5 MHz)
- TVW Perth/Mandurah (DVB-T): 1385 @ 6 (177.5 MHz)
- New Zealand (DVB-T): 1419 on UHF band IV
- Freeview Metro (virtual): 77
- Freeview Regional (virtual): 67, 75 and 65

Streaming media
- Telstra T-Box/iTVSN Live: 920 and itvsn.com.au via RTSP

TVSN (an acronym for "Television Shopping Network") was an Australian and New Zealand broadcast, cable television and satellite television network specialising in home shopping. It is owned by parent company Direct Group Pty Ltd, a home marketing and shopping company based in the Sydney suburb of Frenchs Forest, which also owns sister channel Expo.

The channel broadcast live every day from 08:30 to 21:30 AEST.

== History ==
TVSN began broadcasting on 4 December 1995 from the North Ryde studios owned by Global Television (originally owned by Channel 10 Sydney) as The Value Channel. Warehousing was located off-site, as were the management and buying team. In May 1996, the channel was acquired by investors in Hong Kong and was rebranded as TVSN in June. It was soon listed on the Australian Securities Exchange in 1999 after sustaining some growth. Later in 2001, the channel moved to a purpose-built facility close by in Lane Cove, which also included onsite warehousing and management offices, being the first time all aspects of the operation were contained within the one location.

In 2004, the network was acquired by Innovations Direct Group Pty Ltd, an Australian-based home shopping company which produces a number of direct catalogue publications, including Innovations and Homecare magazines. Channel operations soon moved to new facilities in Frenchs Forest alongside the parent company. The new studios began broadcasting between Christmas and New Year in 2006 using some technology contained in an outside Broadcast truck located in an adjacent laneway, which was eventually redundant a few months later as the control rooms were completed soon after.

In April 2022, equity partners CPE Capital invested $40 million into its parent company Direct Group.

In October 2026, it was announced that TVSN would be closing down after more than 30 years of operation, after failing to find a new owner. Its parent company, Direct Group, stated that the channel would continue to operate while a buyer was sought, and would abandon the closure process if one was found.

== Channels and livestreaming ==
Some Australian pay television services carry TVSN as part of their basic subscription package. These services include Foxtel, Austar and Optus TV. It was previously carried by Neighbourhood Cable. The channel is also available free to air via the Optus C1 satellite. In addition, the company's website and their TVSN Now app for Android TV, Samsung, LG and Apple TV broadcasts a live video stream of the channel.

On 24 September 2012, TVSN became available to free-to-air to metropolitan viewers after Network Ten and TVSN partnered to broadcast the channel as a datacast service on LCN 14. From December 2012 to July 2016, regional Network Ten affiliate Southern Cross Ten broadcast the channel to regional viewers on LCN 54. At the same time, Southern Cross Austereo also broadcast TVSN on LCN 64 in Tasmania and LCN 74 in Darwin.

On 1 July 2016, Southern Cross Ten became part of Southern Cross Nine affiliated to the Nine Network, while WIN Television became the Network 10 affiliate. Consequently, TVSN would be broadcast on LCN 84 in Regional Queensland, Southern New South Wales and ACT, Griffith, Regional Victoria, Mildura, Tasmania, Eastern South Australia and Regional Western Australia via WIN.

Southern Cross Austereo used its old TVSN channel space to broadcast a similar New Zealand-based shopping channel, Yesshop, in their regional areas. The Yesshop channel became available on 1 August 2016 in Queensland, Southern NSW, ACT and Victoria on LCN 55; Northern NSW, Spencer Gulf and Broken Hill on LCN 54; Tasmania on LCN 64 and Darwin on LCN 74.

Northern New South Wales and the Gold Coast, Darwin, Broken Hill, and the Spencer Gulf, relaunched TVSN on 20 December 2016 on the LCNs 57 and 75.

On 30 August 2018 in WIN areas, TVSN became MPEG-4 to prepare for the launch of Sky News on WIN.

On 16 September 2020 in metropolitan areas, TVSN moved from Channel 14 to Channel 16 due to the launch of Network 10's third digital channel 10 Shake.

On 22 January 2024, as part of a new broadcast deal with Seven West Media (now owned by Seven Media Group), TVSN moved channel numbers from the Network 10 multiplex on channel 16 (channel 54/84 in WIN Television areas) to the Seven Network multiplex on channel 77 (channel 67 in regional areas), from 1 July 2024. As part of the deal, TVSN also live streams on 7plus.

== New Zealand version ==
From 20 August 2013, Kordia began broadcasting a localised version of the channel on LCN 20 to a national New Zealand audience on the Freeview terrestrial service and the encrypted Sky satellite channel launched at the same time. TVSN was removed from Sky on 19 August 2020. On 21 August 2021, TVSN was removed from Freeview.

From 21 May 2020, TVSN launched the TVSN Now app across Android TV, Samsung, LG and Apple TV which live streams their broadcast for free. The app provides both New Zealand and Australian versions of the stream, selectable in the menu.

== Logos ==
2001 – 2010

2010 – 2018

2018 – 15 November 2026

== See also ==
- Expo – TVSN's sister home shopping channel
- Shopping channels – a list of home shopping channels worldwide
- Seven Network – the channel's free-to-air broadcast partner
- Network 10 – the channel's former free-to-air broadcast partner
- HSN
