= Wolf-Speaker =

1994 novel by Tamora Pierce

- Original Simon & Schuster/Atheneum U.S. hardcover of the book featuring the title character
- Author: Tamora Pierce
- Language: English
- Series: The Immortals
- Genre: Fantasy
- Publisher: Simon & Schuster/Atheneum
- Publication date: 2 May 1994
- Publication place: United States
- Media type: Print (hardback & paperback)
- Pages: 182 pp (first edition, hardback)
- ISBN: 0-689-31833-2 (first edition, hardback)
- OCLC: 28721934
- LC Class: PZ7.P61464 Wm 1994
- Preceded by: Wild Magic
- Followed by: Emperor Mage

Wolf-Speaker is a fantasy novel by Tamora Pierce, the second in a series of four books, The Immortals.

This book details the journey of Veralidaine Sarrasri as she learns more about her wild magic and her journey to Dunlath to help the wolves, only to find there is a bigger and more dangerous plot afoot.

== Plot summary ==
Daine receives a summons from some old friends — the wolf pack from her old village, led by Brokefang and his mate Frostfur, who are unhappy with the nobles ruining the Long Lake, their territory. They send messengers to ask Daine for help and then disappear back into the night to hunt while Daine discusses the problem with her teacher, Numair Salmalin.

Numair agrees to help the wolves, but he decides to first visit the nobles of the Fief at a party in Castle Dunlath to further investigate, after they find the burnt remains of the Ninth Rider Group.

Numair recognizes Tristan Staghorn, a Carthaki war mage, who appears to be wooing Lady Yolane of Dunlath. After Daine boldly approaches them about the threat to the wolves and the area with a warning that if they don't change, things will happen, the nobles all laugh at her. She retreats with Numair back to their quarters in the village and they steal away from Fief Dunlath in the night.

Tristan Staghorn is a war mage from Carthaki university, where Numair studied to become one of the 7 most powerful mages in the world. Upon discovering Tristan's presence in Dunlath, Numair realizes that the situation is worse than they had thought. He creates a magical simulacrum (clone) of himself and plays on Tristan's knowledge of him back in Carthak, where he was a "book-bound idiot." He explains to Daine that people who are Black robe mages study books and learn nothing practical. Daine seems to think he relies too much on the enemy mage's stupidity.

Shortly after this, Numair decides to go back to the city where King Jonathan is and warn him of something afoot in Dunlath. Daine stays to sort out the mess with her friend Brokefang, and Numair tells her not to do anything extreme or he will lock her in the deepest darkest dungeon he can find when he gets his hands on her again.

Throughout the book, Daine reaches the next level in the development of her wild magic as she starts to share minds with animals, a useful ability as she uses the eyes of squirrels and other creatures to spy. This ability soon translates into gaining certain characteristics of animals once she returns to her natural, human shape.

Daine discovers she has the power to morph into animals after Maura, Lady Yolane's somewhat plain and much younger half-sister, runs away from Fief Dunlath. Shortly afterward Rikash Moonsword, the Stormwing, appears to be fond of Maura, making Daine rethink her theory about all Stormwings being naturally evil. Maura tells Daine about Yolane's plans to become Queen — a deal with Emperor Ozorne of Carthak, (who was also behind the 'pirate' siege of Pirate's Swoop in Wild Magic) - in order to secure the valley's precious, magical Black Opals. In the meantime Daine meets a basilisk named Tkaa, who becomes an important ally and partial tutor to 'Kitten,' her dragonet.

Tristan creates a magical barrier to isolate Fief Dunlath from help. Daine learns that Tristan and his mage friends Alamid and Gissa are going to dump a poison called Blood Rain into the river at the north end of the Long Lake to kill every living thing within ten miles of it. Tristan tries to hurt Daine with his magic, but Numair turns him into an apple tree with a word of power... causing a tree somewhere in the world to turn into a human.

== Release details ==
- 1994, US, Simon & Schuster / Atheneum Books (ISBN 0-689-31833-2), Pub date 2 May 1994, hardback (First edition)
