= Emperor Mage =

1994 fantasy novel by Tamora Pierce

- 1995 Atheneum hardcover of the book
- Author: Tamora Pierce
- Language: English
- Series: The Immortals
- Genre: Fantasy
- Publisher: Scholastic Press
- Publication date: November 17, 1994
- Publication place: United States
- Media type: Print (paperback)
- Pages: 256 pp (first edition, hardback)
- ISBN: 0-590-55802-1
- OCLC: 59967166
- Preceded by: Wolf-Speaker
- Followed by: The Realms of the Gods

Emperor Mage is a 1994 fantasy novel by Tamora Pierce, the third in a series of four books, The Immortals. It details the peace delegation sent by Tortall to Carthak which Daine joins, to save the emperor's birds.

== Plot introduction ==
Daine travels with a Tortallan embassy to Carthak in order to help cure the Emperor's birds of a mysterious sickness, as well to improve relations with the hostile country.

== Plot summary ==
Daine is sent with a delegation that includes both Sir Gareths of Naxen, Alanna the Lioness, and Numair Salmalin, to the Emperor Mage of Carthak, in hopes that she can smooth the international relations by helping with his prized birds. All seems well in the elaborate court of the charming emperor, who continues to proclaim his innocence in stirring up troubles in Tortall and seems to truly care for his prized aviary. This soothes the nervous delegation, though the situation is complicated by Numair, who had to flee Carthak and Ozorne's ire several years before.

Daine makes several friends in Carthak, including Numair's former teacher and close friend Lindhall Reed, Ozorne's heir and nephew Kaddar, and a marmoset named Zekoi. She also is reunited with the Stormwing Rikash Moonsword, who seems to bear her no significant ill will and in fact warns her several times about the trouble brewing in the empire. Despite her best efforts, she gets caught up in not only the political situation, but a religious one as well. Emperor Ozorne Muhassin Tasikhe has been neglecting the worship of the gods, primarily the chief Goddess of Carthak, the Graveyard Hag.

To Daine's surprise and later chagrin, she realizes that the Graveyard Hag has given her the ability to revive dead bodies, which leads to a series of mixed episodes which includes the revival of an only partly assembled Archaeopteryx skeleton and culminates in the revival of a whole nest of dinosaur eggs and nestlings. The reanimation of the nest results in Daine killing herself and having to get forcibly revived by the Badger god. During the time she is "dead," she gets a brief image of her mother with a mysterious horned stranger.

Daine fights her newly given "gift," which cannot be taken away except by the Graveyard Hag, who has supreme power in Carthak as the primary goddess. It is noted that the only one more powerful in Carthak is the Black God, god of death, but she is his daughter and he listens to her in matters involving Carthak. The Graveyard Hag urges Daine, as her vessel, to act by causing chaos with the revival of the human dead to get Emperor Ozorne to remember the gods once more. Daine is understandably disinclined to do so.

During her time healing the birds, Daine realizes that the birds illness is caused by metal paint that they are eating saying that it tastes good (it contains salt as well as lead) When she tells this to Ozorne, he congratulates her and gives her a drug to make her sleep in her food. Meanwhile, the Tortallan party is planning to leave Carthak, but Numair will not leave his "magelet" behind.

Daine is rescued from the dungeon by Zek, who is very fascinated by keys. She then meets up with Prince Kaddar. He tells her that Ozorne had Numair killed. Daine is overcome with fury. Using her power to revive dead beings to create an army out of the hall of bones. While looking for Ozorne, she meets with Numair's ex-lover. Daine tells her that Numair is dead. Daine finds the Hyenas and transforms into one. Using their excellent sense of smell, they hunt down Ozorne. They are about to attack him when he stabs himself with the Stormwing feather given to him by Rikash. Ozorne turns into a stormwing and flies away with the rest of them. Daine turns around to see Kaddar, Lindhall, and Numair. Losing her grip on her Hyena self, Daine transforms into her human, naked self. Numair gives her his robe and tells her that a Simulacrum of himself was caught and "killed" by Ozorne, not the real Numair. Then, the Graveyard Hag comes and takes the power of reviving the dead from Daine. Four days later, Daine wakes up to find Alanna at her side. She then goes to talk to His Imperial Highness, Kaddar. He tells Daine that she can have whatever she wants for saving his life (his uncle was planning to have him accused of treason of plotting against him). Daine asks that the people who have wild magic and the emperor's mutes must be released from slavery.

== Characters ==
- Veralidaine Daine Sarrasri – The main character in this book series, The Immortals.
- Skysong – Daine's constant companion throughout the series.
- Zek – A marmoset that joins the party and plays a pivotal role in the story.
- Numair Salmalin – Daine's teacher and friend.
- Alanna of Pirates Swoop and Olau – King's Champion and part of the delegation
- Prince Kaddar – Ozorne's nephew and Daine's friend
- Ozorne – The Emperor Mage
- Graveyard Hag – Most important god in Carthak, gave Daine the power to revive dead bodies
- Rikash Moonwing – A returning character from the previous book.

== Reception ==
Kirkus Reviews predicted the fans will love it and that "will be a huge seller."
