= DirectBand =

Datacasting network

FM station channels

DirectBand was a North American wireless datacast network owned and operated by Microsoft. It used FM radio broadcasts in over 100 cities to constantly transmit data to a variety of devices, including portable GPS devices, wristwatches and home weather stations.

== How it works ==
DirectBand used the 67.65 kHz subcarrier leased by Microsoft from commercial radio broadcasters. This subcarrier delivers about 12 kbit/s (net after ECC) of data per tower, for over 100 MB per day per city. Data included traffic, sports, weather, stocks, news, movie times, calendar appointments, and local time.

=== Not like RDS ===
DirectBand did not use the RDS (Radio Data System) subcarrier. RDS is a different system and has much lower data rate (~730 bit/s after ECC, including framing). Its much narrower subcarrier is primarily used for radio station information and traffic. DirectBand and RDS can co-exist on the same FM station.

=== Forward acting error correction ===
Since many DirectBand uses were mobile, and there was no opportunity to request retransmission of a broadcast signal, DirectBand utilized an advanced error-correction strategy that allowed for reconstruction of messages even when sizable portions of the message were lost due to buildings, tunnels or other obstructions of the FM signal. Error correction was 1/2 rate interleaved trellis with time diversity, soft-decision decode. The DirectBand data rate was in excess of 12 kbit/s after ECC.

=== Push network ===
DirectBand was a push network – new content was delivered every two minutes. Users pre-selected the virtual channels that they were interested in.

== Receivers ==
There were a variety of DirectBand receivers. All used a small (2.794 mm × 2.794 mm × 860 μm) radio receiver. Some designs added an ARM7-based processor.

The initial DirectBand products were a series of data watches. These had mild success, but never met expectations and production of new watches was discontinued in 2008. Recently, several other applications have surfaced, the most visible being the traffic data/local info market, particularly to auto GPS sets for Garmin and Avis. This competes directly with older RDS-based services, which operate at a substantially lower data rate.

== Microsoft design ==
DirectBand is a product of the Smart Personal Objects Technology (SPOT) team at Microsoft. System hardware was designed for Microsoft by SCA Data Systems of Santa Monica, California. MSN Direct is the consumer brand that Microsoft uses for devices that receive content from the DirectBand network.

== FM subcarrier usage ==
RDS uses a portion of the FM station spectrum immediately above the stereo signal, centered at 57 kHz (the stereo pilot frequency). RDS extends between about 55 and 59 kHz. DirectBand is above RDS, extending from about 59 kHz to 75 kHz.

== Shutdown ==
On October 26, 2009, Microsoft announced that MSN Direct service would end on January 1, 2012.

Although this clearly indicated Microsoft's intent to cease usage of the service, it is not yet known whether the DirectBand technology will be sold to another company, such as one of the hardware licensees of MSN Direct (e.g. Garmin) – or whether the technology will be put in the public domain as an open source technology.

== See also ==
- RDS
- PSIP
- Error correction
- Modem
- FM broadcasting
