= The RealReal =

American consignment company

The RealReal, Inc.
- Type: Public
- Traded as: Nasdaq: REAL
- Industry: Recommerce
- Founded: 2011; 15 years ago
- Founder: Julie Wainwright
- Headquarters: San Francisco, California
- Key people: Rati Sahi Levesque (CEO)
- Products: Ready-to-wear; couture; handbags; footwear; accessories; jewelry; watches; fine art; homewear
- Services: Consignment
- Revenue: ▲$600 million (2021)
- Number of employees: 3200 (2023)
- Website: therealreal.com

The RealReal, Inc. is an online marketplace for users to buy and sell luxury goods that are authenticated by experts. It was started in 2011 by Julie Wainwright and is headquartered in San Francisco.

It has more than 38 million members, and has sold nearly 40 million items as of September 30, 2023.

== History ==
The RealReal was founded in 2011 by Julie Wainwright, an e-commerce entrepreneur. By July 2018, the company had raised $288 million in venture capital funding.

On May 31, 2019, The RealReal submitted a preliminary filing (S-1) to the SEC to go public.

On June 28, 2019, The RealReal went public on Nasdaq under the symbol REAL and raised $300 million during its IPO.

On June 22, 2022, The RealReal announced that its founder and CEO Julie Wainwright had stepped down. The company appointed President and COO Rati Sahi Levesque and its CFO Robert Julian as interim co-CEOs.

On January 25, 2023, The RealReal announced the appointment of E-Commerce and Digital Executive John E. Koryl as CEO and Board Member.

On October 28, 2024, The RealReal announced Rati Sahi Levesque, the company's second employee and co-founder, as CEO.

At the end of 2024, The RealReal announced full year profitability.

== Services ==
With nearly 40M members, The RealReal is the largest platform for authenticated luxury resale in the United States. The RealReal offers five ways to sell luxury goods on the platform: in-home pickup, drop-off appointments in its boutiques, meetings with luxury experts, and direct shipping.

The RealReal handles item authentication, pricing (using AI and machine learning), photography, listing, shipping, payments and customer service on behalf of others.

== Retail footprint ==
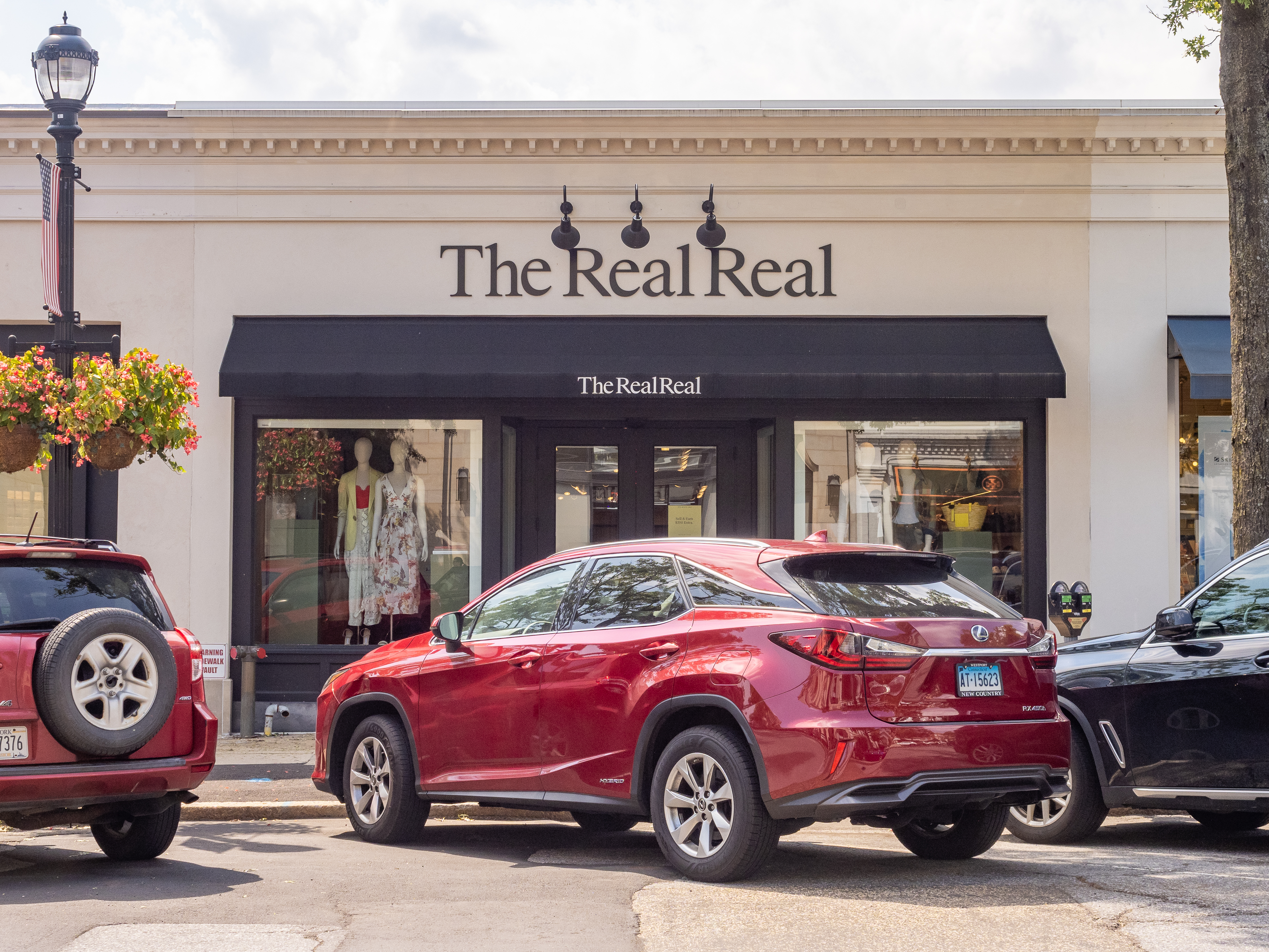
Location in Greenwich, Connecticut

In 2017, The RealReal opened its first permanent retail store in New York City, and has since opened stores across the US including locations in California, Connecticut, Florida, Illinois, New Jersey, New York and Texas. To date, the company has 17 Luxury Consignment Offices where consignors can drop items off and meet with a valuation specialist, and 14 of those 17 locations allow customers to browse and shop.

== Counterfeits ==
The RealReal has had multiple claims from luxury designers that items on their website were counterfeit. In 2018, Chanel filed suit in the Federal Court of the Southern District of New York, alleging The RealReal for hosted counterfeit Chanel on their website and misled customers that an affiliation existed between the two.

In 2019, Richard Kestenbaum, writing for Forbes, disclosed purchasing a bag from The RealReal for $3,600, sold as an authenticated Christian Dior bag, that was found to be counterfeit. Kestenbaum claims the only authentication of many pieces at The RealReal is from a single copywriter, whose main task is to write the descriptions of the merchandise being sold, instead of the expert authenticators The RealReal advertises.

In a 2021 update, Kestenbaum wrote about a customer who paid $1,000 for a pair of Christian Dior sneakers from The RealReal, but upon receiving them, was suspicious of their quality and sent the shoes to be authenticated by LegitGrails, a third party authenticator. LegitGrails uses no fewer than four authenticators to authenticate a single item, compared to The RealReal's alleged use of a single copywriter for authentication, and determined the customer's shoes were a "lower grade replica" of Dior sneakers. The RealReal refunded the customer; when Forbes asked the company for a comment, it stated it has the "most rigorous authentication process in the marketplace" and has added artificial intelligence to its authentication process. Forbes claims the large amount of merchandise processed by The RealReal to maintain profit margins (the company went public in 2019) makes it inevitable that counterfeit products slip past its authentication and into the hands of customers.

In early 2020, TheRealReal was sued in a class action lawsuit regarding misstatements to investors, alleging that authenticators were given very little training and strict quotas that resulted in the potential for counterfeit or mislabeled items to make it through the company's authentication process more often than purported.

The RealReal alerts law enforcement of counterfeit items it receives. Items sent to The RealReal deemed "friendly fakes", counterfeit items purchased unintentionally, are usually returned to the client; others are destroyed or retained for training purposes.

== Sustainability ==
The RealReal is a leader in advocating for a sustainable future for the fashion industry.

The brand has kept over 40 million items in circulation since its founding in 2011. Additionally, 4.68 Billion liters of water use have been avoided and 85,857 metric tons of greenhouse gas emissions have been avoided. In 2017, The RealReal announced a sustainability partnership with luxury fashion brand Stella McCartney, which launched in 2018.

It also established the first Monday in October as National Consignment Day, an annual holiday. The following year, to mark National Consignment day, The RealReal launched a custom sustainability calculator. Developed with environmental consulting firm Shift Advantage, it measures the environmental impact of consignments processed by the company.

To celebrate Earth Month in 2025, The RealReal launched its first Resale Report: Circularity.
