= Digital Forty Four =

Sydney television datacasting service

- Country: Australia
- Broadcast area: Sydney

Programming
- Language: English

Ownership
- Owner: Broadcast Australia

History
- Launched: 17 March 2004; 22 years ago
- Closed: 30 April 2010; 16 years ago

Availability

Terrestrial
- SD Digital: 4; 40–49; 401–407

Digital Forty Four was a Sydney-only trial datacasting service that was licensed by the Australian Broadcasting Authority (now the Australian Communications and Media Authority) beginning on 17 March 2004 for an initial two-year run until 31 December 2006. The license was extended on several occasions past 2006, however on 29 January 2010 it was announced that Broadcast Australia's datacasting licence for Digital Forty Four would not be extended past 30 April 2010. At midnight on 30 April 2010, all services from Digital Forty Four ceased broadcasting.

The services provided at various times during its six years of operation have included a television guide for free-to-air television, a community service channel providing information on road, weather and surf conditions, with live broadcasts every fifteen minutes, the Australian Christian Channel, Expo shopping channel, NITV, Teachers TV information channel and live broadcasts of the meetings of the Australian Parliament, with audio-video coverage of the House of Representatives and Senate.

== Channels ==
Under conditions associated with the datacasting licence, channels on the Digital Forty Four service had to be either text based or narrowcast services. Entertainment programming was not allowed on the service, however some programming on the Australian Christian Channel was shown in a reduced screen format with text content around it, as that satisfied the datacast requirement.

Channel lineup prior to trial end
DVB name	LCN	Launch date	Discontinued date	Notes
Channel 4	4	2008	30 April 2010	Video program guide for free-to-air and D44 channels.
NITV	40	27 October 2008	30 April 2010	Existing subscription channel added to D44 service. Remains available on subscription satellite and cable television. Available free-to-air on LCN 34 via SBS since 12 December 2012.
ABC News, Sport and Weather	41	17 March 2004	30 April 2010	Text only.
D44 Homepage	42	17 March 2004	30 April 2010	Broadcast on LCN 44 prior to addition of TVS in March 2010. Simulcast on LCN 40 prior to addition of NITV on 27 Oct 2008.
Television Sydney	44	March 2010	30 April 2010	Existing digital community television channel added to D44 service.
Teachers TV	45	3 November 2008	30 April 2010	Broadcast on LCN 47 (shared with House of Representatives channel) until 30 June 2009.
Australian Christian Channel	46	2004	30 April 2010	Existing subscription channel added to D44 service. Remains available on subscription satellite and cable television.
Federal Parliament House of Representatives	47	17 March 2004	30 April 2010	Live video/audio feed of House of Representatives sessions. Broadcast on LCN 401 until 3 November 2008, LCN 47 shared with Teachers TV from 2008-09 (broadcast when the House was not in session).
Federal Parliament Senate	48	17 March 2004	30 April 2010	Live video/audio feed of Senate sessions. Broadcast on LCN 402 until 3 November 2008.
Expo	49	2006	30 April 2010	Existing shopping channel added to D44 service. Still available on Foxtel subscription television.

=== Former Channels ===
As it was a long term trial, many channels that started on the service did not continue until the cessation of broadcasts.

DVB name	LCN	Launch date	Discontinued date	Notes
Channel NSW	45	17 March 2004	1 July 2009	Community channel broadcasting real time traffic, coast watch information and government announcements owned by the Government of New South Wales. Channel space replaced by Teachers TV.
Macquarie Digital	47	12 October 2004	11 June 2007	Broadcast financial information. Owned by Macquarie Group.
SportsTAB	48	17 March 2004	1 January 2005	Broadcast sports betting odds.
House of Representatives; Main Committee	403	17 March 2004	3 November 2008	Live video/audio feed of House of Representatives Main Committee sessions.
House of Representatives Committee Room 1	404	17 March 2004	3 November 2008	Live video/audio feed of House of Representatives Room 1 sessions.
House of Representatives Committee Room 2	405	17 March 2004	3 November 2008	Live video/audio feed of House of Representatives Room 2 sessions.
House of Representatives Committee Room 3	406	17 March 2004	3 November 2008	Live video/audio feed of House of Representatives Room 3 sessions.
House of Representatives Committee Room 4	407	17 March 2004	3 November 2008	Live video/audio feed of House of Representatives Room 4 sessions.

== Legacy ==
Free-to-air television guide

The ACMA decided in closing the service that it was unlikely that datacast services would come to auction in the near future, and decided continuing the trial was unnecessary for that reason. NITV, which gained coverage on the service, considered the closure of the service a blow to its chances of gaining permanent spectrum for the service, and put the long term viability of the service into question.

Most of the other channels on Digital Forty Four are available unencrypted on satellite or via online streaming.

== See also ==
- Datacasting
- Television broadcasting in Australia
