= MovieBeam =

Video-on-demand service

- Company type: Conglomerate
- Industry: Video-on-demand
- Founded: September 2003; 22 years ago, in the United States
- Founder: The Walt Disney Company; Movie Gallery
- Defunct: December 15, 2007
- Owner: The Walt Disney Company; Movie Gallery

MovieBeam was a video on demand service started by The Walt Disney Company, specifically its subsidiary Buena Vista Datacasting, LLC. Movies were sent wirelessly into the subscriber's home by embedding digital data (datacasting) within local Public Broadcasting Service (PBS) stations' analog TV (NTSC) broadcast to deliver the movies to a set-top box. The data was embedded using dNTSC technology licensed from Dotcast, and distributed to TV stations via National Datacast through the vertical blanking interval, the same method used to provide closed captioning. Up to ten new movies were delivered to the player each week. The player also contained free movie trailers, previews, and other extras.

The set-top box was sold for a one-time fee ($149.99 as of August 2007). The cost of viewing a movie varied from $1.99 for older movies in standard definition to $4.99 for newer releases in HD. Movie rentals expired 24 hours after the rental period began.

The box featured the highest-end connection hardware of the time, including HDMI, component video outputs, and coaxial and optical digital audio outputs. The box also had USB 2.0 and Ethernet ports, although these were not activated in the last release of the firmware. An HDMI or DVI-D connection was required to watch HD content in 720p resolution.

MovieBeam connected to the servers by telephone line to trigger billing of rented movies. The modem may or may not have worked with VOIP lines, depending on the quality of the connection.

Disney spun off this company in January 2006. Intel Corporation, Cisco, Disney and several venture capital firms including Intel Capital, Mayfield Fund, Norwest Venture Partners and Vantage Point Venture Partners had invested $48.5 million in MovieBeam.

On March 7, 2007, Movie Gallery, Inc., attempting to diversify beyond physical video rental, acquired MovieBeam, Inc. Movie Gallery at the time stated that the expected cost of acquisition, plus operating expenses for 2007, was $10 million.

On December 5, 2007, as a result of Movie Gallery filing for Chapter 11 bankruptcy, MovieBeam began calling its customers informing them that MovieBeam would be ceasing operations on December 15, 2007, and on that date MovieBeam officially shut down service.

As with most over-the-air paid television services, MovieBeam required a perfectly clear over-the-air signal in order to download the film data from the vertical blanking interval, and there was a possibility in a certain month that the MovieBeam customer would have no interest in any of the films offered (nor of extra or trailer content); though not wasting any digital bandwidth, it would then needlessly use energy to download unwatched content. Most viewers already received those stations through cable and satellite providers, which offered much more robust pay-per-view or video on demand services of film content, including from Disney. Presumably, cable services offering MovieBeam's channels were fully-compatible with MovieBeam and the MovieBeam set top box could download content that way, but providers were free to filter out VBI data services which duplicated their own offerings for the sake of full picture clarity and which would waste cable bandwidth.

Because of the over-the-air method of download, the films, if purchased, were excessively compressed and of lesser quality than DVD or Blu-ray. Sealing the service's limited life would be that the service used full-power NTSC analog broadcasts instead of digital ATSC 1.0; NTSC had an upcoming expiration date of February 17, 2009 via full-power stations (later revised to June 12, 2009) due to the upcoming digital transition. There was no public knowledge of a new digital-specific revision oncoming to the system.

== See also ==
- Disney Channel#Other services, describing Disney Family Movies, a scaled-down version of MovieBeam utilizing traditional cable pay-per-view providers
- Disney+, Disney's current-day streaming platform
