= Qterics =

American technology company

- Industry: Digital Television Services
- Predecessor: Broadcast Data Corporation; UpdateLogic Incorporated
- Founded: 2003; 23 years ago
- Headquarters: Plymouth, Minnesota, United States
- Products: NetReady™; UpdateTV
- Owner: Silicon Image
- Website: Official website

Qterics (formerly Broadcast Data Corporation and later UpdateLogic Incorporated ) is a company which has developed a system for datacasting firmware upgrades to digital television devices. It appears that UpdateTV is the only product the company, founded in 2003, has yet developed.

== Products ==
=== UpdateTV ===
UpdateTV is a multipath worldwide distribution system which allows digital televisions to automatically receive firmware upgrades and software patches sent out via terrestrial broadcast, digital cable networks, and the Internet. The network and technology has been under development by UpdateLogic since 2004, was completed in 2006, first shipped in TV sets in 2008 by Sony Electronics, and is now shipped in TVs from Sanyo and others.

In the terrestrial case, the UpdateTV solution which works within the ATSC A/97 (Software Data Download Service, or SDDS) protocol, will be datacast by National Datacast on PBS TV stations across the United States. Major cable operators are required by contract to transmit the data such that the software upgrades are also passed to their customers. UpdateLogic works with content delivery network providers, or Internet service providers, to download the software update(s) to connected devices.

TV manufacturers work with UpdateLogic to schedule the network distribution of the software patch(es) and optimize the roll-out to ensure the TVs receive it. The upgrades are transmitted repeatedly every day over a period of many months, in part so that the update is not missed due to a power outage, being unplugged (such as to prevent lightning damage while a resident is away, or perhaps being in storage), or due to data corruption or data loss caused by interference or weak signal strength in rural areas or mountainous terrain - which only occurs in the terrestrial broadcast distribution. UpdateTV does ask the user to give consent to install the software on their TV. There is no charge to the consumer for installing an update.

Software updates for television sets have fixed issues with video resolution, format compatibility, channel changing speed, V-chip ratings, user interface, timer controls, and more.

UpdateTV is enabled on silicon chip set solutions from Broadcom, AMD, Zoran and others.

The UpdateTV network can deliver updates to many types of devices - not just television sets. Devices such as Blu-ray players, mobile/handheld TVs, set-top boxes and gaming consoles are capable of using the service - since they are connected to the Internet, a cable network, and/or a digital TV antenna.

== Sale to Silicon Image ==
On May 6, 2014, Silicon Image purchased UpdateLogic for an undisclosed price. On December 4, 2014, Qualcomm purchased a 7% stake in the company for US$7 million. Effective on that date, UpdateLogic was renamed Qterics.
