= Movie Gallery =

Defunct movie and game rental company (1985–2010)

Movie Gallery, Inc.
- Final logo, adopted 2000

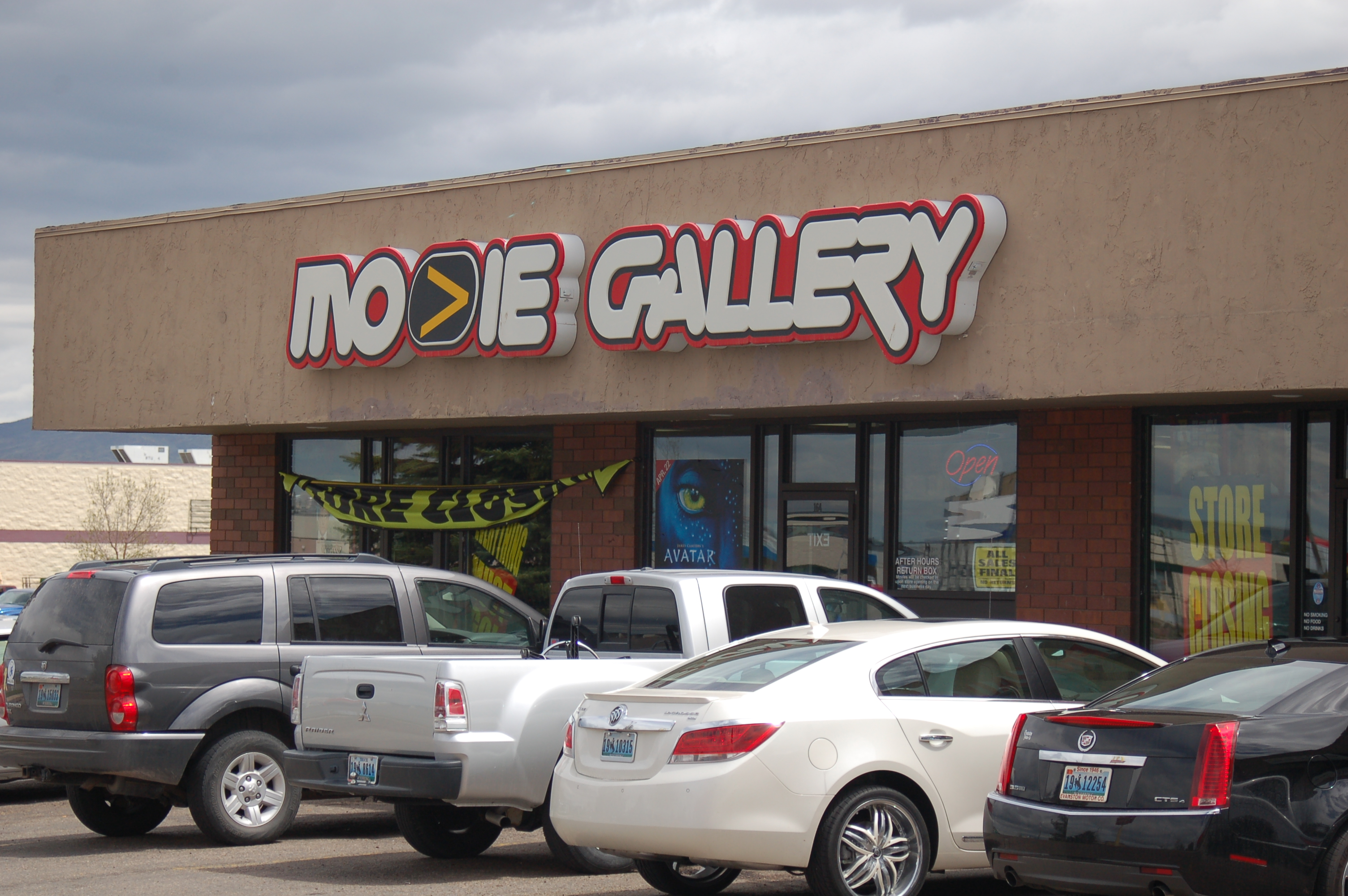
- Store closing in Cheyenne, Wyoming as part of the original re-organization from the 2010 bankruptcy
- Type: Public
- Traded as: Nasdaq: MOVI
- Industry: Retail
- Founded: December 11, 1984; 41 years ago, in Union Park, Florida, United States
- Founder: Jerry D. Turner
- Defunct: July 31, 2010; 16 years ago (United States); August 8, 2010; 16 years ago (Canada)
- Fate: Chapter 7 bankruptcy Liquidation sale
- Headquarters: Kissimmee, Florida, United States (1984-1992) Dothan, Alabama, United States (1992-2009) Wilsonville, Oregon, United States (2009-2010)
- Number of locations: 2,500 (2010)
- Areas served: United States, Canada
- Key people: Wes Sand (COO)
- Products: VHS, DVD, Blu-ray and video game rentals and sales
- Number of employees: 19,100 (2010)
- Subsidiaries: Hollywood Video; MovieBeam; Reel.com; VHQ
- Website: MovieGallery.com (archive)

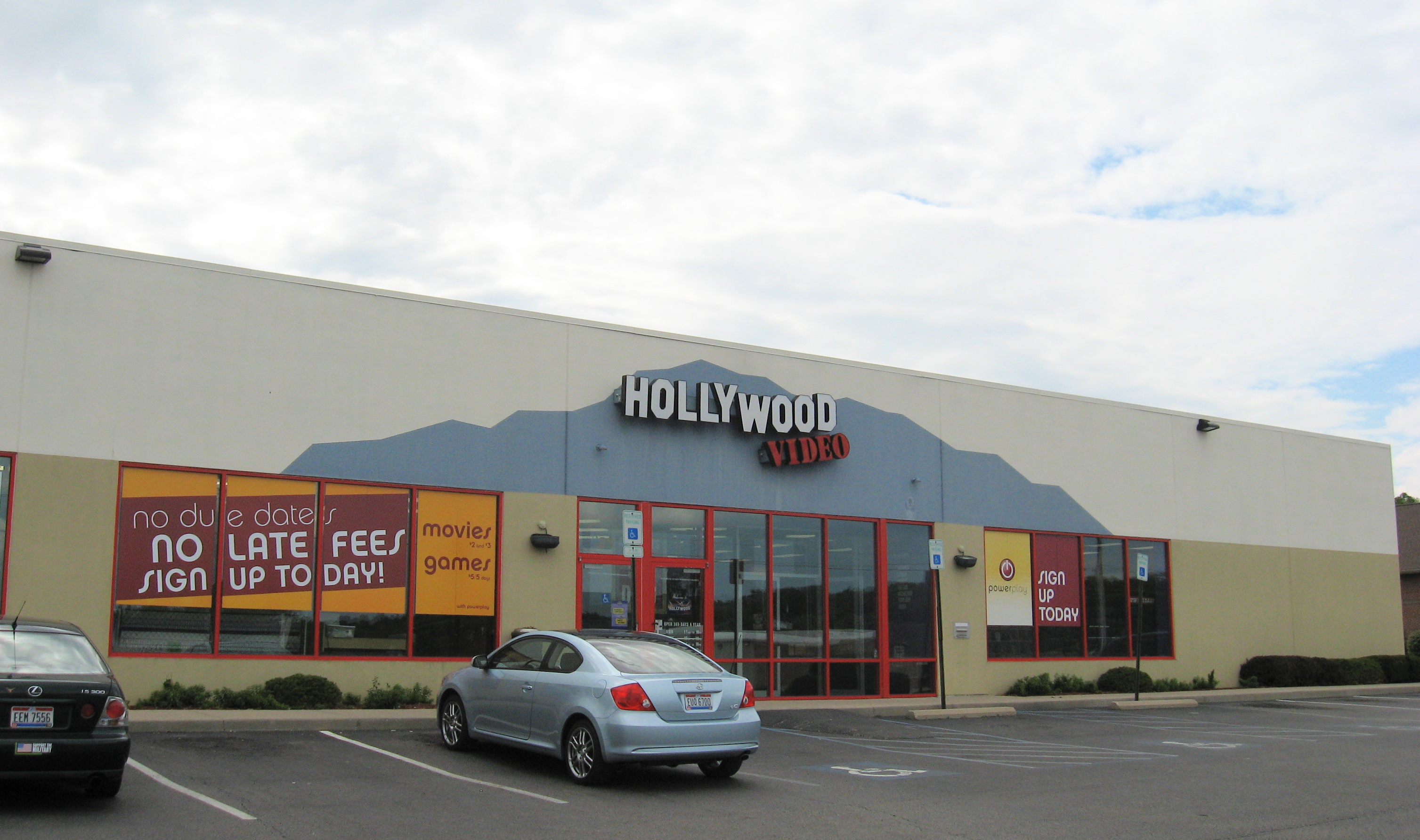
Hollywood Video with attached Game Crazy location in Springboro, Ohio in 2009

Movie Gallery, Inc. (stylized as MO>IE GALLERY) was an American movie and game rental company based in Wilsonville, Oregon. With a total of 4,749 stores at its peak, it was the second largest video retailer in the United States and Canada, behind Blockbuster Video. The company rented and sold Blu-ray Discs, DVDs, VHS tapes, and video games. Initially founded as a subsidiary of a small Kissimmee, Florida video rental chain, the company would move its headquarters to Dothan, Alabama in 1992, and later to Wilsonville in 2009.

On April 30, 2010, Movie Gallery announced it was closing and liquidating all of its stores per a filing of Chapter 7 bankruptcy. At the time of the company's bankruptcy, the company had approximately 2,500 stores in North America, operating under the Movie Gallery, Hollywood Video, and GameCrazy brands. The last of the company's stores were closed on August 8, 2010.

In 2011, three Movie Gallery locations in Northwest Arkansas reopened by an independent business owner who acquired the trademark rights in Arkansas.

Most regular Movie Gallery stores were located in rural areas, while Hollywood Video locations, which competed directly with Blockbuster, were located in urban areas.

== History ==
The first Movie Gallery store opened on December 11, 1984 in Union Park, Florida, in the Orlando-Kissimmee metropolitan area. It was an outcropping of National Home Video, a Kissimmee-based enterprise founded a year prior by 19-year-old Jerry D. Turner. Due to its generic name and causing potential confusion with National Video, all stores would be converted to the Movie Gallery name by the end of 1985. By June 1987, the company owned five stores and had 45 franchise locations. In 1988, Movie Gallery began consolidating franchisees into company‑owned stores. By 1992, the company operated 37 stores and reported approximately $6 million in annual revenue.

M.G.A. Inc. (Movie Gallery of Alabama) was the first out-of-state franchisee, founded by Joe Malugen and Harrison Parrish in Dothan, Alabama. They would open the first location outside of Florida on Ross Clark Circle in Dothan in February 1985. After National Home Video, Inc. began to experience financial difficulty in the early 1990s, M.G.A. would acquire the Movie Gallery name and assets in September 1992, moving the chain's headquarters to Dothan.

In August 1994, the company completed an initial public offering of its stock. With the proceeds from this offering, the company began to quickly complete acquisitions of various video chains, primarily in the southeast. In early 1995, the company raised additional public funds and continued the acquisition and development of stores. By the middle of 1996, only 22 months after beginning its aggressive expansion strategy, Movie Gallery had grown to over 850 stores through over 100 separate acquisitions.

In 1999, Movie Gallery announced plans to build 100 new stores. The company completed an 88-store acquisition of Blowout Entertainment in May and ended the year with more than 950 locations in 31 states. In 2000, Movie Gallery again set its goal at opening 100 new stores and relocating 25. This goal was surpassed.

The company moved forward with its largest single-chain acquisition to date, expanding its base of stores by 30%, in late December 2001. The addition of Video Update stores to the Movie Gallery family launched the company's international presence with 100 retail locations in Canada. From 2001 to 2002, the number of Movie Gallery stores has increased by 49 percent, or 510 locations, most of which were acquired through the purchase of Video Update. Movie Gallery achieved the 1,678 store mark in 2002.

In 2005, the company completed the largest acquisition to date with the Hollywood Entertainment merger. This combination of companies increased the store total to 4,700 with revenues in excess of $2.5 billion. In addition, Movie Gallery opened 61 new stores in Western Canada with the acquisition of VHQ Entertainment.

=== Downfall ===
The company began having financial difficulties and announced the closure of 520 stores in September 2007. At the time Movie Gallery had about 4,500 locations. The next month, the company filed for Chapter 11 bankruptcy protection under the U.S. Bankruptcy Code. Because of these troubles, the stock price dropped below $1 (~$2.00 in 2025) per share and was removed from listing on the NASDAQ stock exchange in November 2007.

An additional 400 stores were scheduled to close announced in February 2008, followed by another 160 stores were scheduled to close announced in April 2008 during the bankruptcy reorganization. Movie Gallery emerged from Chapter 11 in May 2008 and appointed C. J. Gabriel, Jr. as the new chief executive officer. Founder and former CEO Joe Malugen continued to serve on the Movie Gallery Board of Directors until leaving on July 30, 2008. The company relocated its headquarters to Wilsonville, Oregon (home of the Hollywood Video subsidiary), in late 2008. In January 2009, they closed their Wilsonville distribution center.

In early 2009, Movie Gallery operated about 2,700 locations and 1,300 Hollywood Video locations in the United States. Canadian operations included over 200 "Movie Gallery" branded stores, as well as approximately 60 under the VHQ brand in western Canada. In 2009 Movie Gallery closed its Wilsonville, Oregon distribution facility, merging it with one in Nashville, Tennessee.

The Chapter 11 reorganization plan failed to solve all of the company's problems; Movie Gallery's stock fell from $1.25 at close in October 2009 to $0.05 a share at close on December 3, 2009, and many locations fell behind on rent. On February 1, 2010, stores received a report stating that about 800 stores were to be shut down. The company hired the law firm of Sonnenschein, Nath & Rosenthal to prepare for a second filing of bankruptcy, and on February 3, 2010, they again filed for Chapter 11 bankruptcy protection. During a company-wide conference call on April 30, 2010, it was announced that all U.S. Hollywood Video, Movie Gallery, and Game Crazy stores would file for Chapter 7 bankruptcy in May 2010. On June 8, 2010, the company's Canadian stores also entered liquidation.

The last US Movie Gallery and Hollywood Video locations closed on July 31, 2010, and the liquidation sale was completed. The remaining Canadian division outlets also closed during the week of August 8. The contents of the company's headquarters were auctioned off in August 2010.

== Subsidiaries ==
=== MovieBeam ===
MovieBeam was a set-top service offered in larger cities in which customers could download movies to a set-top box. Most movies expired within 24 hours of downloading. The company was founded by Disney and other investors as an alternative to online movie downloads. A special set-top box had to be purchased by consumers for the service at a retail price of $149.95. Most major movie studios provided new release content to the service. However, MovieBeam failed to gain any serious traction in the marketplace. MovieBeam was shut down on December 15, 2007. As of June 2008 the remnants of MovieBeam, including its trademarks and other intellectual properties, were sold to an outside investors group for approximately $2 million (~$2.93 million in 2025) as part of the company's restructuring. All in-store kiosks for the service were then removed as well.

=== Hollywood Video ===
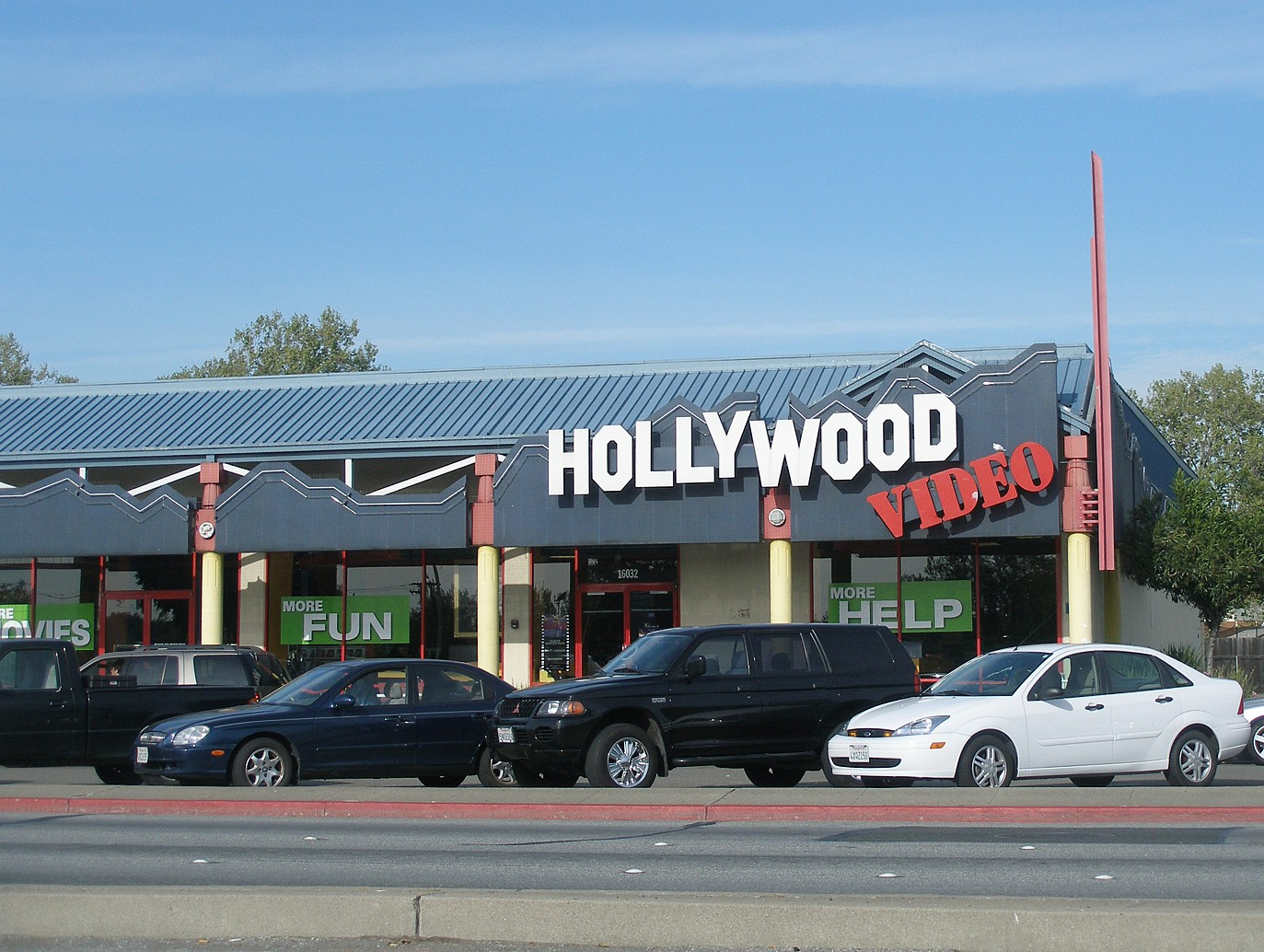
A typical Hollywood Video outlet in San Lorenzo, California in 2007

Hollywood Video, a subsidiary of Movie Gallery, Inc., operated from Wilsonville, Oregon, as a DVD and video game rental shop chain in the United States. It was started in 1988 by former CEO Mark Wattles and his wife. The chain was the largest direct competitor of Blockbuster Video until it was purchased by Movie Gallery in 2005. Hollywood Video declared bankruptcy in February 2010 and announced that it would shut down three months later.

==== Purchase of Hollywood Video ====
Hollywood Video was the target of a hostile takeover attempt, initially announced at the end of December 2004 by competitor Blockbuster Video. In February 2005, Blockbuster announced an exchange offer of $14.50 (~$23.00 in 2025) per share ($11.50 cash and $3.00 in Blockbuster shares).

In order to create a stronger position against the hostile takeover, Hollywood Video agreed to a buyout on Monday, January 10, 2005, by its smaller competitor Movie Gallery. Movie Gallery paid $860 million, $13.25 per share, and the assumption of $380 million in debt. Stocks closed at $13.85 on January 10 after the news. Blockbuster then dropped its purchase plans, citing anti-trust concerns. Movie Gallery completed its purchase of Hollywood Video on April 27, 2005.

== Headquarters ==
Movie Gallery originally had its headquarters in Dothan, Alabama. In Dothan, the company had 70,000 square feet (6,500 m^{2}) of space in the Porter Square Mall. Later in its life the company's headquarters were in Wilsonville, Oregon.

In 2005 Movie Gallery bought Hollywood Video, gaining Hollywood's office space in Oregon. Movie Gallery operated its Oregon office out of the space, and Hollywood Video, now a subsidiary of Movie Gallery, maintained its headquarters in Wilsonville. In 2007 Movie Gallery filed for Chapter 11 bankruptcy protection. In 2008 when the company emerged from Chapter 11, its new upper management had no ties whatsoever to Dothan, Alabama. Joe Malugen, the founder of Movie Gallery, was no longer the CEO; instead, C. J. Gabriel, an Idaho resident, was named the CEO. Because of this, Jim Cook of The Enterprise Ledger said "there may be little motivation for keeping the home office" in Dothan. In 2008 the headquarters moved to Wilsonville. The former Porter Square Mall space went up for lease or sale. Movie Gallery kept some central employees in Dothan, and the company said that it would continue to have a "presence" in Dothan. Wendy Culverwell of the Portland Business Journal said that the headquarters move decision was "unusual" because "most of Hollywood Entertainment's decision-making authority went to Alabama after the sale to Movie Gallery in 2005."

After the company filed for Chapter 7, Great American Group, Inc. held an auction on August 17, 2010, at the Wilsonville, Oregon headquarters of Movie Gallery, auctioning away the company's equipment.

== See also ==
- Veterans Memorial Stadium in Troy, Alabama, formerly Movie Gallery Stadium
