= Direct Group Pty Ltd =

Australian direct marketing holding company

Direct Group
- Industry: Direct marketing
- Founded: 1985
- Headquarters: Sydney, Australia
- Areas served: Australia and New Zealand
- Number of employees: 250 (2025)
- Divisions: Expo Channel; TVSN
- Website: directgroup.com.au

Direct Group is a direct marketing holding company operating in Australia and New Zealand. The company, founded in 1985, operates with three primary divisions: Direct marketing, direct selling and direct television.

The company owns Australian shopping channels TVSN and Expo Channel, with the former also available in New Zealand. Both channels feature products which can be purchased online or over the phone by viewers. Products purchased from the channels are distributed from a 5.3-hectare (13-acre) facility in the Sydney suburb of Frenchs Forest. In Australia, TVSN became a free-to-air channel through a partnership with Network 10 in 2012, after previously only being available on subscription television.

In 2017, the company acquired the Australian and New Zealand Reader's Digest business, which includes the magazine of the same name, Handyman magazine, and the sale of a range of merchandise. Handyman folded in 2018.

It also markets a range of goods through direct marketing catalogues including Innovations, Entertainment Masters, Damart, Victoria Hill, The Fox Collection, Gaiam and Infofashion. The company previously owned EziBuy.
