= National Datacast =

American datacasting company

National Datacast Incorporated (NDI) was a pioneer in data broadcasting. It was a for-profit subsidiary of the Public Broadcasting Service (PBS), which had a minority stake in the final years of this subsidy. It handled datacasting on PBS TV stations throughout the United States. Services using ATSC digital TV included MovieBeam and UpdateTV. UpdateTV continues to be operated by its present owner, Qterics, leasing bandwidth to other companies for the purpose of automatic television firmware updates.

National Datacast was formed in 1988 based on PBS' early work in closed captioning for the hearing impaired.

It used NTSC horizontal line 21, which is at the end of the vertical blanking interval, and thus, potentially visible as blinking black and white bars at the top of the screen in the overscan area. This artifact can often be seen when viewing old footage on modern televisions or PCs that no longer crop the overscan area. Uniquely, NDI may also have used other horizontal lines in the vertical blank for other types of data transmission.

It ceased operations in 2015.
