= Stuart Skorman =

Stuart Skorman (born 1948) is an American entrepreneur, consultant and author. He founded the companies Empire Video, Reel.com, HungryMinds.com, Elephant Pharmacy, and Clerkdogs.com, He is the author of the book Confessions of a Serial Entrepreneur, Why I Can't Stop Starting Over (Jossey-Bass, 2006).

== Career ==
Skorman was an executive at Bread & Circus, the Boston-based natural foods chain bought by Whole Foods in 1992.

Empire Video

In 1985, Skorman founded Empire Video in Manchester Center, Vermont. According to Video Store Magazine, the company had the highest volume video stores of any chain in the US for three consecutive years. Later in 1994, he sold the company to Blockbuster Video for $6 million, after helping to build a movie recommendation kiosk system as a consultant for the company.

Reel.com

The company Reel.com was founded by Skorman in September 1996. He launched the website in January 1997, as an online movie information site and e-commerce site. In July that year, Skorman also opened a walk-in store in Berkeley, California. He later added Cinema U, an online film school, for customers who wanted to learn about movies including movie history and film theory. In 1998, he sold Reel.com to Hollywood Entertainment Corp. for $100 million and became a consultant to the company.

Hungry Minds

In early 1999, Skorman founded Hungry Minds, an internet learning portal. The company offered links to online courses and other learning resources including classes from UC Berkeley Extension, UC Extension and NYU online. Hungry Minds was sold to IDG Books Worldwide in August 2000 and Skorman stayed on as a consultant and adviser.

Elephant Pharmacy

In 2002, Skorman founded Elephant Pharmacy, a holistic big box pharmacy, in Berkeley, California. The store provided products and services including alternative remedies, pet medicines, organic groceries and a health related book library in addition to general prescriptions. The company expanded but closed in 2009 as a result of the recession while Skorman had left the company in 2006.

Clerkdogs.com

In December 2008, Skorman launched ClerkDogs, a movie recommendation website. In 2011 Netflix had licensed ClerkDogs’ database and the company's managers were working with Skorman as a consultant to augment Netflix's computerized movie recommendations.

== Recognition ==
He is known for pioneering new business models and challenging the long-standing companies in the industries he enters. As a result of his work in the dot com industry, he was referred to as one of the 'dotshots' of the 1990s. He consulted for Borders Inc, a bookstore chain, to increase sales, and has been an adviser to a chain of restaurants for thirty years.

== Books ==
Skorman is the author of the book Confessions of a Serial Entrepreneur: Why I Can't Stop Starting Over. (Jossey-Bass, 2006)
