= Channel NSW =

TV channel in New South Wales, Australia

- Country: Australia
- Broadcast area: Sydney
- Network: Digital Forty Four

Programming
- Picture format: 576i (SDTV)

Ownership
- Owner: Government of New South Wales

History
- Launched: 17 March 2004
- Closed: 30 April 2010

Availability

Terrestrial
- SD Digital: 45

Channel NSW (also known as CNSW) was a community information digital television channel that ran under trial in the Sydney area. The service was provided and operated by the Government of New South Wales. It was carried via Digital 44 using the Digital Video Broadcasting – Terrestrial (DVB-T) system had its own channel on Channel 45.

CNSW had gained a large audience, with a reach of over 250,000 households per month in Sydney. This was forecast to grow to over 1 million households by 2009.

The NSW Government had plans for NSW settlements of 2,000 people or more to receive the service terrestrially. The channel ceased transmissions at midnight on 30 April 2010.

== Content ==
Channel NSW included these programs:

- ecoNSW – environment
- PictureJockey (PJs) – photos
- Good Health NSW Health
- PeakHour – traffic, weather, and related info
- Seniors TV
- School Kid TV
- NSW Life – lifestyle
- Allballs – lottery results
- Arts Magazine
- Late Night Languages
- Careers Show
- uTVstar – community access
- Parliament of New South Wales – live parliament feed
- Job Show – NSW Government jobs

NSW Government agencies which provided services through CNSW include the:

- Roads & Traffic Authority
- NSW Health
- Department of Education & Training
- State Emergency Service, Rural Fire and Fire Brigades
- Office of Industrial Relations, NSW Government Jobs Service
- NSW Lotteries
- Sydney Harbour Foreshore Authority, The Rocks, Tourism NSW
- Art Gallery of NSW, State Records, Powerhouse Museum
- Department of Environment and Conservation
- Sydney Water

== History ==
Key milestones in the development of the service to date are as follows:

- Commonwealth grants NSW trial license (December 2003);
- Initial service launched by the Minister for Commerce (March 2004);
- Remote playout operations capability enabled (July 2004);
- Initial audiovisual capability tested (August 2004);
- Block scheduling capability (February 2005);
- First field audience research (October 2005); and
- Interactive TV services lab testing (MHP) (March 2006).

== Future ==
Channel NSW was running as a trial and is a work in progress. The NSW government had future plans for the channel which included:

- Live event coverage, such as Parliament question time;
- Automated whole-of-government announcements service; and
- "Resource Show", a hybrid media program about the environment.
