= Expo Channel =

Australian home shopping television network owned by Direct Group

- Country: Australia

Programming
- Picture format: 576i (SDTV); 16:9 272p (Live stream)

Ownership
- Owner: Direct Group Pty Ltd
- Sister channels: TVSN

History
- Launched: 2 September 2002
- Closed: 10 March 2026

Links
- Website: expochannel.com.au

Availability

Streaming media
- Expo Channel Live: expochannel.com.au
- Telstra T-Box: Channel 921

Expo Channel is an Australian home shopping infomercial channel. It is owned by parent company Direct Group Pty Ltd, a marketing and direct sales company based in the Sydney suburb of Frenchs Forest, which also owns sister channel TVSN. The channel operates by selling 'air-time' to 3rd party infomercial clients. As such unlike TVSN, EXPO does not warehouse or acquire its own products for sale. On Foxtel, the channel ceased broadcasting on 10 March 2026.

== History ==
In 2002, Optus TV launched Expo Channel on its cable television platform. Today, the channel is broadcast 24 hours a day on the major Australian subscription television platforms, as well as Freeview in some areas.

== Availability and Live Stream ==
Most Australian pay television services carry Expo Channel as part of their basic subscription package. These services include Foxtel, Austar and Optus TV. The trial datacasting service Digital Forty Four in Sydney carried the channel free-to-air, on channel 49, from 2006 to its discontinuation on 30 April 2010, as well as via the Optus C1 satellite. Also, the Freeview channel Seven Regional owned by Seven West Media also airs overnight blocks from Expo Channel. In addition, the company's website broadcasts a live video stream of the channel.

== See also ==
- TVSN – Expo's sister home shopping channel.
- Shopping channels – A list of home shopping channels worldwide.
- Digital Forty Four
