= Play N Trade =

American franchisor

Play N Trade Franchise Inc.
- Company type: Franchise
- Industry: Electronics stores
- Founded: 2000; 26 years ago
- Founder: Ron Simpson
- Defunct: 2014
- Headquarters: San Clemente, California, U.S.
- Number of locations: 116
- Area served: Northern America, Egypt, Panama, Colombia
- Products: Video games and consoles and Consumer electronics
- Services: Buy sell trade video games, consoles and consumer electronics
- Revenue: ▲$25 million USD (2012)
- Owner: Jared Turner, Ron Simpson

Play N Trade Franchise Inc., which did business as Play N Trade, was an American franchisor operating in the video game and consumer electronics space, with an emphasis on video gaming lifestyle. The company, whose headquarters were in San Clemente, California, United States, operated stores throughout the United States, Canada, Panama and Egypt. Play N Trade was referred to as "the fastest-growing video game retail franchise" in the United States, and was at one point the second-largest specialty video game retail in the United States. As of January 10, 2013, Play N Trade operated 116 franchised locations globally.

Play N Trade stores sold new and used consumer electronics, including video games and consoles, Apple products, laptops, and cellular phones, and accept trade-ins of the same. Services included video game rental, parties, tournaments, events, and gaming device repairs.

Play N Trade filed for bankruptcy protection on March 2, 2014. As of 2024, some locations continue to operate as independent retailers.

== History ==
Play N Trade was founded in 2000 by (now retired) founder Ron Simpson of Colorado Springs, Colorado. The current leadership team includes executives from the automotive industry, Walt Disney Imagineering, as well as several tech entrepreneurs in the wireless industry. In Phoenix, many stores of Play N Trade have either been moved or shutdown.

In 2007, Play N Trade was ranked in the Franchise 500 and New Franchise 50 by Entrepreneur Magazine and had doubling its nationwide stores in 2006. Entrepreneur Magazine also named Play N Trade one of the top ten new franchises for 2008.

The State of California fined Play N Trade $132,500 for violating the state's franchising laws in 2009.

Play N Trade Franchise Inc. filed for bankruptcy on March 2, 2014, and was dissolved.
