= The Immortals (Pierce series) =

Fantasy novel quartet by Tamora Pierce

- Wild Magic; Wolf-Speaker; Emperor Mage; The Realms of the Gods
- Author: Tamora Pierce
- Country: United States
- Language: English
- Genre: Fantasy, young adult fiction
- Publisher: Simon & Schuster/Atheneum
- Published: 1992-1996
- Media type: Print (hardback and paperback); Audiobook
- Preceded by: The Song of the Lioness
- Followed by: Protector of the Small

The Immortals quartet, by Tamora Pierce, is the story of Veralidaine Sarrasri (known as Daine), an orphan with an unusual talent: she can speak with animals.

== Books ==
1. Wild Magic
2. Wolf-Speaker
3. Emperor Mage
4. The Realms of the Gods

=== Brief summary ===
The orphan Daine applies for a job that takes her and her trusty pony Cloud from her birthcountry of Galla to the kingdom of Tortall. Here she finds a new life and a new family, and learns that she has the magical ability known as "Wild Magic", which enables her to speak to animals, heal them, and take their shape as well as bend them to her will. She makes friends with a lineup of characters and creatures, including the black-robe mage Numair Salmalin, a young dragon named Skysong (nicknamed Kitten), the legendary Lioness, Alanna of Trebond, King Jonathan, and Queen Thayet of Tortall.

== Characters ==
=== Main ===
- Veralidaine "Daine" Sarrasri: The main character of the quartet, she is a young woman possessing "wild magic," and has the power to speak to, heal, and shapeshift into animals. Born in the village of Snowsdale in Galla, her father is Weiryn, a minor god of the hunt who fell in love with Daine's mother, Sarra. Despite her original fear of her wild magic overpowering her, she learns to control her power. She is shown to hate Stormwings, magical creatures who prey on fear and warfare, in the first books, but later changes her mind when she realizes that Stormwings are simply what they are. She even develops a tentative friendship with a Stormwing named Rikash. Daine (along with other characters of the series) also appears briefly in the Protector of the Small and Daughter of the Lioness series.
- Numair Salmalin: A brown skinned, very tall, very powerful mage with the ability to shape shift. He is one of the seven "black-robe" mages in the world, and though is usually mild-mannered and awkward, can be extremely emotional at times. This is shown when he turns a mage gone bad (a former friend at school named Tristan Staghorn) into a tree after he, (Tristan) tries to hurt Daine. In "Emperor Mage," he is hinted to have been Emperor Ozorne's friend once, but they are now enemies. He is Daine's teacher and eventual love interest; they are married shortly before the events of Trickster's Choice and have two children, Rikash and Sarralyn.
- Onua Chamtong: A trader and horse mistress for the Queen's Riders. She hires Daine as her assistant in Wild Magic. It is revealed that she was physically abused by her husband and left for dead before joining the Riders. She has a very affectionate dog, Tahoi (meaning "ox") and possesses the Gift and some Wild Magic. A friend of Numair and Alanna, Onua is gifted with the ability to hide things with her magic. She uses the bow well.
- Ozorne: Emperor of Carthak, until the end of Emperor Mage, when he is tricked into turning into a Stormwing. He is ruthless and loves power, though he is shown as having a soft side for birds and other animals, especially immortals. He and Numair do not get along and he is said to have banished his old friend before. An extremely powerful mage, Ozorne made the mistake of believing himself invincible.
- Kaddar: The prince of Carthak, becoming emperor at the end of Emperor Mage. Friend of Daine because he was her guide during her visit to Carthak. Though at first he acts a bit stiff, he is really kind at heart and finally defies his uncle while simultaneously saving his life from the enraged Daine, who had shape-shifted into a hyena.

=== Immortals ===
- Skysong (nicknamed Kitten): A baby dragon whose mother died in the battle at Pirate's Swoop in Wild Magic. Skysong was initially dead in the womb before Daine inadvertently healed her mother, and afterwards Daine becomes her guardian for the rest of the series. It is shown that despite her love for Daine, Skysong needed "discipline" from her own kind and that she would later return to the dragon's home in the Divine Realms. She is shown to be highly advanced and can whistle locks open, sense invisibility spells, and detect magic used for spying.
- Tkaa: A basilisk who found Daine in Dunlath and became a friend. He also appears as an envoy to the Copper Isles in Daughter of the Lioness and as the teacher of the immortals class in Protector of the Small. His first encounter with Numair showed his power. Though he meant him no harm, he threw magic at Numair and he turned him into a rock as self-defense. He broke out of the rock in a few minutes, paused, and asked if Tkaa would do it again so he could see if he could break out of the rock a second time. He refused, but the two became good friends. Tkaa is said to have skin like solid gray drops which darken and lighten in patterns across his skin.
- Rikash Moonsword: A Stormwing introduced during Wolf-Speaker, who eventually becomes Daine's friend and ally. Daine is shown to have named her son Rikash in Trickster's Queen. He is always insulting and teasing her, but shows rare kindnesses, like awkwardly comforting her when she believed Numair was dead. In Wolf-Speaker, he is shown to have a soft spot for Maura of Dunlath, his ward.
- Barzha Razorwing: A Stormwing queen, who, with her consort Hebekah, is imprisoned by Ozorne in Carthak. They are released at the end of Emperor Mage and become Daine's allies. Daine accidentally informs Rikash of their whereabouts, startling the Stormwing because he and his kind were told that they had been killed in a fair fight.

=== Animals ===
- Cloud: A pony that Daine has had since before the series started. She is quite stubborn, but is very loyal to Daine. It was partly through her ability to speak with Cloud that Daine learned of her wild magic. She refers to Numair as "Stork Man". Cloud's mind was changed after repeatedly biting Daine and getting some of Daine's wild magic inadvertently transferred into her, and she can reason and think like a human. It is revealed that she can transfer her energy to Daine, as shown at the end of Wild Magic, so the girl could kill the Stormwing Queen, Zhaneh Bitterclaws.
- Tahoi: A large dog (his name means "ox") that works with Onua and Daine on the trails with the horses, he saved Onua's life when her husband had beaten her and left her for dead. He is a "one woman dog," but takes to Daine anyway. He is an expert at guarding the ponies and avoiding being kicked by them.
- Zekoi: A pygmy marmoset that Daine befriends after saving it from crocodiles in the River Zekoi during the events in Emperor Mage. He is said to have a family back in the wild and has a fascination with keys. After he was captured, he learned more about keys, and then vowed to always have keys from then on. He later frees Daine from Ozorne's prison with a set of his favorite objects.

=== Others ===
- Sarra Beneksri: Daine's mother, who is killed in the events preceding Wild Magic. It is discovered as the series progresses that she has become The Green Lady, a minor goddess of women and childbirth, and was married to Weiryn. She was a midwife before she was killed, and possessed the Gift.
- Weiryn: Daine's father, and a minor god of the hunt. He is mostly human in appearance, though with a pair of antlers. Resigned to the fact that Daine, his child, won't eat game, (she eats game through the first and second book) Weiryn nevertheless provides her with a beautiful bow and a magical staff for Numair to aid them on their journey in The Realms of the Gods.
