= Hollywood Video =

Defunct American video rental company (1988–2010)

Hollywood Entertainment Corp.

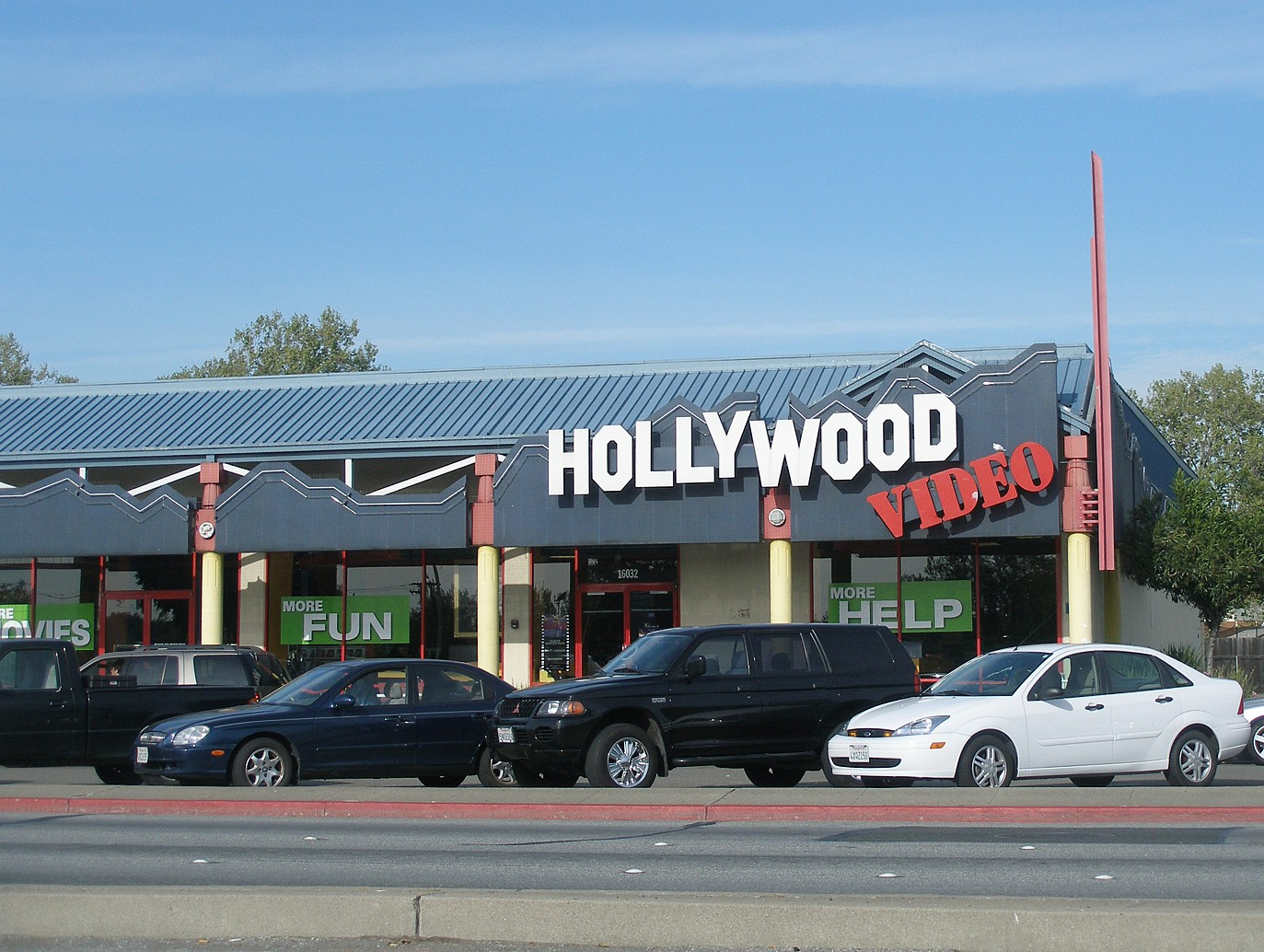
- A typical Hollywood Video store in San Lorenzo, California in 2007
- Trade name: Hollywood Video
- Type: Public
- Traded as: Nasdaq: HLYW
- Industry: Retail
- Founded: June 1988; 38 years ago, in Portland, Oregon, U.S.
- Founder: Mark Wattles
- Defunct: July 31, 2010; 16 years ago (United States of America); August 8, 2010; 16 years ago (Canada)
- Fate: Chapter 7 bankruptcy Liquidation sale
- Headquarters: Wilsonville, Oregon, U.S.
- Number of locations: 1,900 (2010)
- Products: VHS, DVD, Blu-ray, and video game rentals and sales
- Parent: Movie Gallery
- Subsidiaries: GameCrazy; Hollywood Entertainment
- Website: hollywoodvideo.com

Hollywood Entertainment Corp., more commonly known as Hollywood Video, was an American video rental store chain based in Wilsonville, Oregon. Founded by Mark Wattles in 1988, the chain would quickly expand following the company's initial public offering in 1993, which led to them being the largest direct competitor to Blockbuster in the urban market.

Towards the end of the 1990s, Hollywood Video was the first major chain to introduce DVD rentals in their stores, and would expand into the internet with the purchase of Reel.com in July 1998. However, following the rise of video on demand services in the early 2000s, the company began to experience losses. As a result, the company would establish GameCrazy, a video game retailer, in an attempt to enter the video game market.

Following a hostile takeover attempt by Blockbuster, Hollywood Entertainment Corp. would merge with Movie Gallery, Inc. for $1.2 billion in April 2005. While this acquisition initially boosted Movie Gallery's profits, the newly assumed debt would contribute to the company's bankruptcy, and eventual liquidation in 2010.

In December 2011, the chain's website would relaunch as an entertainment news blog. The website remains active, with several entries being made in 2025.

== History ==
In 1984, Mark Wattles left college and was struggling financially. Wattles' parents had given him and his wife a VCR, which they used as a form of low-cost entertainment. Wattles later said: "I thought, 'There must be other people in America in the same shoes. I think this would be a great business." In 1985, Wattles borrowed money so he could open Home Theater, a 500 square-foot video rental store with 300 films, located in downtown Portland, Oregon. Three years later in 1988, Wattles formed Hollywood Entertainment and served as the company's president and chief executive. Hollywood Video stores later opened in Washington, California, Nevada, and Texas.

In 1993, Hollywood, which operated 16 stores, became a public company. As of 1994, the average Hollywood Video store was 7,500 square feet with 16,000 video tapes. In some instances, the company ordered up to 70 copies of a popular film for each store, while some stores stocked up to 200 copies of a single film. At that time, each store generated approximately $1 million (~$1.87 million in 2024), while 78 additional stores were planned to open in 1995.

In January 1995, Blockbuster filed a $10 million lawsuit against Hollywood Entertainment for hiring five former Blockbuster employees. Blockbuster alleged that the employees knew some of the company's trade secrets, which could be used to aid Hollywood Entertainment. At the time, Hollywood Video had 117 stores, compared to Blockbuster's 2,800 stores. Hollywood Video was ranked fourth in national sales. In May 1995, a judge ruled in favor of Hollywood Entertainment, stating that Blockbuster had failed to demonstrate irreparable harm as a result of the hiring.

In June 1995, Hollywood Entertainment had 153 stores in 11 states. The company's locations included stores operating under the Video Park and Video Central names. That month, Hollywood Entertainment announced plans to triple the number of stores by late 1997. In August 1995, Hollywood Entertainment purchased the 42-store Video Watch chain in the mid-western United States for $59 million (~$111 million in 2024). Video Watch was the last of four video rental chains that had been targeted by Hollywood Entertainment for purchase. In November 1995, Hollywood Entertainment announced plans to open 90 stores in Michigan over the next three years. The company also planned to open more than 200 stores in 1996.

In 1996, Hollywood decided to establish three regional offices, with one each in the Chicago, Houston, and San Francisco Bay Areas. Julie Wainwright became president and CEO of Reel.com, replacing founder, Stuart Skorman. After 27 months, in July 1998, CEO Mark Wattles announced Hollywood had purchased Reel.com "in a deal valued at $100 million", which included $30 million (~$55.2 million in 2024) in cash to Reel's stockholders; Reel.com was to continue operating independently, and led by its CEO Julie Wainwright, then Wainwright then left the organization to be replaced by Jeff Jordan.

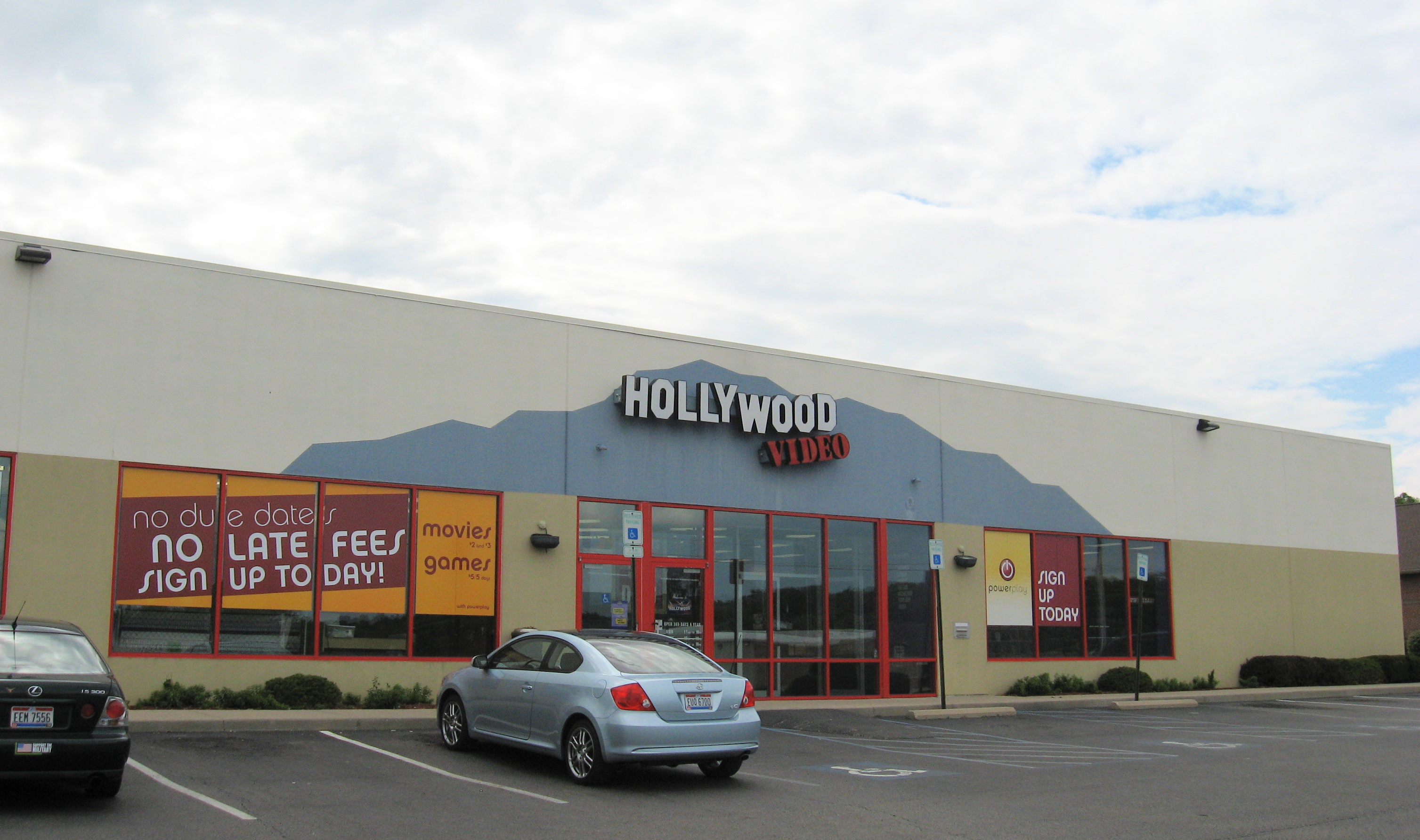
Hollywood Video in Springboro, Ohio in 2009, with attached GameCrazy location

=== Merger with Movie Gallery, Inc., and bankruptcy ===
Hollywood Video was the target of a hostile takeover attempt, initially announced at the end of December 2004 by competitor Blockbuster Video. Blockbuster announced an exchange offer of $14.50 per share ($11.50 cash and $3.00 in Blockbuster shares). In response, Hollywood Video agreed to a buyout on January 10, 2005, by Movie Gallery, a smaller competitor. Movie Gallery paid $860 million, $13.25 per share, and the assumption of $380 million in debt. Stocks closed at $13.85 on January 10 after this news. Blockbuster then dropped its purchase plans, citing antitrust concerns. Movie Gallery completed its purchase of Hollywood Video on April 27, 2005. As a result of the merger, Hollywood Video would become a subsidiary of Movie Gallery and maintained its Oregon headquarters,which Movie Gallery would eventually move into.

Hollywood's last US store closed on July 31, 2010, whereas the last in Canada closed on August 8 of that year.

In December 2011, the website hollywoodvideo.com was relaunched as a movie news curator blog. The site used an automated "social scoring algorithm" to link to articles on the web pertaining to movies and other entertainment media content. The site also contained a blog written by a single editor (that was later expanded to multiple editors) about current movie-related news. As of April 2013, the "social scoring algorithm" part of the site was removed and replaced with the blog. The website also contained an interface for searching and buying movies from Amazon.com from within the Hollywood Video site.

== Headquarters ==
At one time, Hollywood Video was headquartered in Beaverton, Oregon, in an 85,000-square-foot (7,900 m^{2}) office building. In 1996, Hollywood moved its employees out of the building two years into its five-year lease. In 1996, Poorman-Douglas Corp agreed to occupy all of the space in the Beaverton building, relieving Hollywood of extra rent payments.

After Hollywood decided to leave Beaverton, it signed a long-term lease for a 166,000 square feet (15,400 m^{2}) building in Wilsonville, Oregon. Robert Goldfield of the Portland Business Journal said that Hollywood Video "barely" took occupancy of the structure; then Mark Wattles, the chief executive, decided to move the offices and the Hollywood Video headquarters to the former Smith's Home Furnishings headquarters in Wilsonville. In 1996 170 full-time employees worked from the headquarters. The 173,000 square feet (16,100 m^{2}) headquarters facility was no longer occupied by October 1998; as of that month the space was for lease.

In 1997, when Hollywood was considering a new headquarters location, the City of Wilsonville had signage codes that did not allow companies to use neon. The codes made Hollywood consider using other locations. Members of the City of Wilsonville's development review boards said that neon was out of character for the Wilsonville Business Park, Hollywood Video's prospective location.

In January 1999, Trammell Crow Co. bought the 77 acres (31 ha) Thrifty Payless Inc. headquarters for $25.5 million and then broke the compound into sections, selling pieces of it for a total of $22 million; Trammell Crow retained control of the $8 million, 120,000-square-foot (11,000 m^{2}) headquarters building. Hollywood leased the headquarters building, and Hollywood remained headquartered in Wilsonville.

== See also ==
- List of companies based in Oregon
- Blockbuster LLC
