= List of applications using Lua =

The Lua programming language is a lightweight multi-paradigm language designed mainly for embedded systems and clients.

This is a list of applications which use Lua for the purpose of extensibility.

== Video games ==
In video game development, Lua is widely used as a scripting language by game programmers, perhaps due to its perceived ease to embed, fast execution, and short learning curve.

In 2003, a poll conducted by GameDev.net showed Lua as the most popular scripting language for game programming. On 12 January 2012, Lua was announced as a winner of the Front Line Award 2011 from the magazine Game Developer in the category Programming Tools.

== Other uses ==
Other applications using Lua include:

- 3DMLW plugin uses Lua scripting for animating 3D and handling different events.
- Adobe Photoshop Lightroom uses Lua for its user interface.
- Aerospike Database uses Lua as its internal scripting language for its user defined function (UDF) abilities, similar to procedures
- Apache HTTP Server can use Lua anywhere in the request process (since version 2.3, via the core mod_lua module).
- Ardour hard disk recorder and digital audio workstation application uses Lua for scripting including the ability to process audio and Midi.
- ArduPilot an open source unmanned vehicle firmware that uses Lua for user scripts
- Artweaver graphics editor uses Lua for scripting filters.
- Autodesk Stingray, a game engine which uses Lua for developing video games.
- Awesome, a window manager, is written partly in Lua, also using it as its configuration file format
- Blackmagic Fusion can be extended and automated through a comprehensive Lua API, as a faster alternative to the Python API.
- The Canon Hack Development Kit (CHDK), an open source firmware for Canon cameras, uses Lua as one of two scripting languages.
- Celestia, the astronomy educational program, uses Lua as its scripting language.
- Cheat Engine, a memory editor/debugger, enables Lua scripts to be embedded in its "cheat table" files, and even includes a GUI designer.
- Cisco Systems uses Lua to implement Dynamic Access Policies within the Adaptive Security Appliance (ASA), and also SIP normalization in Cisco Unified Communications Manager (CUCM).
- civetweb Easy to use, powerful, C (C/C++) embeddable web server with optional Lua support.
- Conky, the Linux system monitoring app, uses Lua for advanced graphics.
- Cocos2d uses Lua to build games with their Cocos Code IDE.
- Codea is a Lua editor native to the iOS operating-system.
- Core uses Lua for user scripts.
- CRYENGINE uses Lua for user scripts.
- Custom applications for the Creative Technology Zen X-Fi2 portable media player can be created in Lua.
- Damn Small Linux uses Lua to provide desktop-friendly interfaces for command-line utilities without sacrificing much disk space.
- The darktable open-source photography workflow application is scriptable with Lua.
- Certain tasks in DaVinci Resolve can be automated by Lua scripts, in addition to the more advanced scripting functions specific to the Fusion page integrated within DaVinci Resolve. Like in Fusion, a Python API can also be used.
- The Daylon Leveller heightfield/terrain modeler uses embedded Lua to let plug-ins be more easily developed.
- Defold is a game engine that uses Lua as scripting language.
- ESPlorer Multiplatform IDE & tools for any ESP8266 developer from luatool author’s, including a LUA for NodeMCU and MicroPython. All AT commands are supported.
- Final Fantasy XIV uses Lua in its game client.
- Eyeon's Fusion compositor uses embedded Lua and LuaJIT for internal and external scripts and also plugin prototyping.
- In the videogame Factorio, Lua is used for creating mods and scenarios (expanding the game with scripting)
- Flame, a large and highly sophisticated piece of malware being used for cyber espionage.
- Friday Night Funkin': Psych Engine uses Lua for stage building, so-called "modcharts" and multi song functions, such as editing HUD or adding more functions.
- Foldit, a science-oriented game in protein folding, uses Lua for user scripts. Some of those scripts have been the aim of an article in Proceedings of the National Academy of Sciences of the United States of America (PNAS).
- FreeBSD's default bootloader is implemented in Lua as of version 13.0.
- FreePOPs, an extensible mail proxy, uses Lua to power its web front-end.
- Freeswitch, an open-source telephony platform, can make use of Lua as a scripting language for call control and call flow among other things.
- Garry's Mod, a sandbox video game, uses Lua for mods, called addons, published on the Steam Workshop.
- Geany, a code editor, has a Lua plugin, GeanyLua.
- Ginga, the middleware for Brazilian Digital Television System (SBTVD or ISDB-T), uses Lua as a script language to its declarative environment, Ginga-NCL. In Ginga-NCL, Lua is integrated as media objects (named NCLua) inside Nested Context Language (NCL) documents.
- GrafX2, a pixel-art editor, can run Lua scripts for simple picture processing or generative illustration.
- HAProxy, a reverse proxying software, may be extended with Lua starting from version 1.6.
- Hollywood, a cross-platform programming language using Lua.
- iClone, a 3D real-time animation studio to create animation movies uses Lua in the controls of its new physics simulation.
- The drawing editor Ipe (mainly used for producing figures with LaTeX labeling) uses Lua for its functions and script extensions.
- KumoMTA, open-source email infrastructure built for enterprises and high-volume senders
- Leadwerks Game Engine uses Lua for user scripts.
- Lego Mindstorms NXT and NXT 2.0 can be scripted with Lua using third-party software.
- lighttpd web server uses Lua for hook scripts as well as a modern replacement for the Cache Meta Language.
- Löve, a 2D game framework for Lua.
- Luanti (formerly Minetest), a 3D game platform, uses Lua for games, mods, and parts of the engine.
- LuaTeX, the designated successor of pdfTeX, allows extensions to be written in Lua.
- MediaWiki, which is used on Wikipedia and other wikis, uses Lua as a templating language provided by Scribunto extension.
- Minecraft modifications like ComputerCraft or OpenComputers allow players to execute Lua on in-game computers.
- Moho, an animation software package distributed by Smith Micro Software, uses Lua as its scripting language, and all of its native tools are built as editable scripts.
- mpv (crossplatform media player, an mplayer fork) uses Lua as a scripting language.
- MySQL Workbench uses Lua for its extensions and add-ons.
- Neovim text editor offers Lua functions as a replacement for Vimscript as a scripting language, both for plugin development and for user configuration.
- NetBSD has a Lua driver that can create and control Lua states inside the kernel. This allows Lua to be used for packet filtering and creating device drivers.
- nmap network security scanner uses Lua as the basis for its scripting language, named nse.
- NodeMCU uses Lua in hardware. NodeMCU is an open source hardware platform, which can run Lua directly on the ESP8266 Wi-Fi SoC.
- NUT allows Applications written in Lua.
- OpenMW, a free and open-source game engine recreation that reimplements the one powering Bethesda Softworks' 2002 open-world role-playing game The Elder Scrolls III: Morrowind.
- OpenResty, a web platform based on nginx, supports Lua scripting in different execution phases.
- Orbiter (simulator) Space Flight Simulator offers some Lua API allowing to customize simulation feedback, or to automatize simple maneuvers
- pandoc, a universal document converter, allows modifications of the internal document representation via Lua scripts.
- Sierra Wireless AirLink ALEOS GSM / CDMA / LTE gateways allow user applications to be written in Lua.
- PewPew Live uses Lua scripting to define community levels.
- PowerDNS offers extensive Lua scripting for serving and changing DNS answers, fixing up broken servers, and DoS protection.
- Project Dogwaffle Professional offers Lua scripting to make filters through the DogLua filter. Lua filters can be shared between Project Dogwaffle, GIMP, Pixarra Twistedbrush and ArtWeaver.
- Project Zomboid is a video game (similar to The Sims but in zombie theme) made in Java, that uses Lua for mods (expanding the game with scripting).
- Prosody is a cross-platform Jabber/XMPP server written in Lua.
- QSC Audio Products supports Lua scripting for control of external devices and other advanced functions within Q-SYS Designer.
- Quartz Composer, a visual programming tool by Apple, can be scripted in Lua via a free plugin produced by Boinx Software.
- Ravenfield (video game) is a first person shooter sandbox game that uses a modified version of Lua.
- REAPER digital audio workstation supports Lua scripting to extend function.
- Reason digital audio workstation uses Lua to describe remote codecs.
- Redis, an open source key-value database, uses Lua (starting with version 2.6) to write complex functions that run in the server itself, thus extending its function.
- Renoise audio tracker uses Lua scripting to extend function.
- RetroShare encrypted filesharing, serverless email, instant messaging, online chat and BBS software, has a Lua plugin for automation and control.
- Roblox is a game platform with its own game engine. It uses a modified version of Lua 5.1 named Luau.
- Rockbox, the open-source digital audio player firmware, supports plugins written in Lua.
- RPM, software package management system mainly developed for Red Hat Linux, comes with an embedded Lua interpreter.
- SAS integrates Lua with PROC LUA as an alternative to its legacy macro language.
- Scrap Mechanic is a video game, that uses Lua in mods that can be downloaded from the Steam Workshop.
- ScyllaDB uses Lua for user-defined functions, which let users deploy server-side scripts to perform data transforms such as aggregations, sums and averages.
- New versions of SciTE editor can be extended using Lua.
- Snort intrusion detection system includes a Lua interpreter since 3.0 beta release.
- The Squeezebox music players from Logitech support plugins written in Lua on recent models (Controller, Radio and Touch).
- Stormworks: Build and Rescue use Lua for microcontrollers scripting / monitor scripting
- Tarantool uses Lua as the stored procedure language for its NoSQL database management system, and acts as a Lua application server.
- TeamSpeak has a Lua scripting plugin for modifications.
- TI-Nspire calculators contain applications written in Lua, since TI added Lua scripting support with a calculator-specific API in OS 3+.
- Torch is an open source deep learning library for Lua.
- Trailmakers is a sandbox- vehicle builder game. It uses MoonSharp to bind Lua into Unity which gives the ability to script gamemodes, custom maps, and general gameplay functions.
- Varnish can execute Lua scripts in the request process by extending VCL through the Lua VMOD (Varnish module).
- Vim has Lua scripting support starting with version 7.3.
- VLC media player uses Lua to provide scripting support.
- Warframe uses Lua for HUD purposes and several other UI operations
- Waze uses Lua internally. waze-4-35-0-15.apk includes Lua 5.3.3.
- WeeChat IRC client allows scripts to be written in Lua.
- WinGate proxy server allows event processing and policy to execute Lua scripts with access to internal WinGate objects.
- Wireshark network packet analyzer allows protocol dissectors, post-dissectors, and taps to be written in Lua.
- X-Plane is commonly extended using the XLua and SASL plugins for aircraft systems and plugins.
- ZeroBrane Studio Lua IDE is written in Lua and uses Lua for its plugins.
