= ABNT NBR 15606 =

- Data coding and transmission specification for digital broadcasting
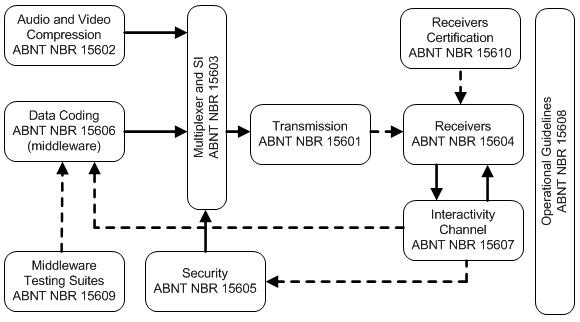
- SBTVD Standards Structure
- Native name: Spanish: Codificación de datos y especificaciones de transmisión para radiodifusión digital; Portuguese: Codificação de dados e especificações de transmissão para radiodifusão digital
- First published: November 11, 2007
- Latest version: 0.0; November 11, 2007

ABNT NBR 15606 refers to a collection of technical standards that govern the transmission of digital terrestrial television in Brazil.

The data coding aspects of the Brazilian Digital Terrestrial Television Standards are described in the following documents published by ABNT, the Brazilian Association of Technical Standards (Associação Brasileira de Normas Técnicas): ABNT NBR 15606-1:2007 - Digital terrestrial television - Data coding and transmission specification - Part 1: Data coding; ABNT NBR 15606-2:2007 - Digital terrestrial television - Data coding and transmission specification - Part 2: Ginga-NCL for fixed and mobile receivers: XML application language for application coding; ABNT NBR 15606-3:2007- Digital terrestrial television - Data coding and transmission specification - Part 3: Data transmission specifications for digital broadcasting; and ABNT NBR 15606-5:2008 - Digital terrestrial television - Data coding and transmission specification – Part 5: Ginga-NCL for portable receivers: XML application language for application coding.

The standard was written by telecommunications and television experts from many countries with their works coordinated by the SBTVD Forum and cover in detail all the aspects of video and audio coding that applies to SBTVD. The complete document can be found and downloaded freely in English, Spanish and Portuguese at ABNT's website.

The standard addresses one of the main advances regarding the middleware specification, one of the Brazilian digital television system. The middleware specification comprises a procedural portion, performed by Java, and a declarative portion, performed by NCL and Lua, with a bridge that allow for mutual access between them. The combined Brazilian middleware specification is called Ginga.

== Document technical overview ==
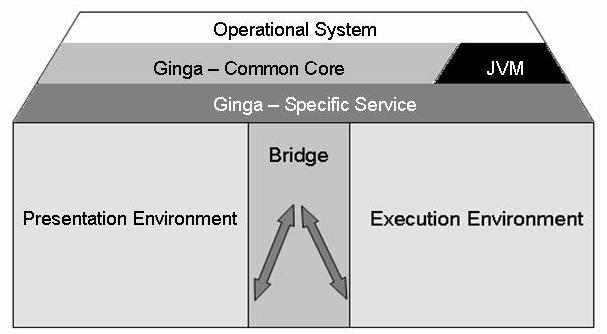
SBTVD middleware structure

Brazil will have a unique joint implementation of declarative and procedural middleware and the bridge between them. The Brazilian data coding system is called Ginga and comprises the language specification used by the presentation engine Ginga-NCL, the monomidia coding and GEM compliant Java presentation engine.

The lower level protocol is the data carrousel for transmission of a data block without any kind of semantics. On the upper level the object carrousel allows the transmission of file, archives, applications, folders and event synchronization. Object carrousel is not part of the Japanese ARIB standards, but rather defined on DVB and ATSC standards.

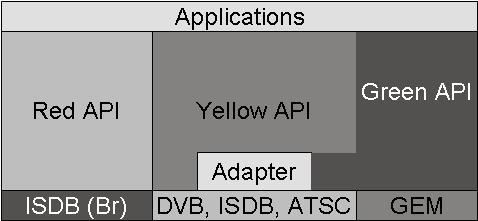
SBTVD middleware structure

NCL, Nested Context Language, is a XML application language recommendation that allows authors to write interactive multimedia presentations in a very simple and efficient manner. Using NCL, an author can describe the temporal behavior of a multimedia presentation, associate hyperlinks (user interaction) with media objects, define alternatives for presentation (adaptation), and describe the layout of the presentation on multiple devices. Unlike HTML or XHTML, NCL has a stricter separation between content and structure and provides non-invasive control of presentation linking and layout. Therefore, NCL does not define any media itself. Instead, it defines the glue that holds media together in multimedia presentations.

The procedural part defines a generic interface between interactive digital applications and the terminals on which those applications are executed. It enables digital content providers to address all types of terminals ranging from low-end to high-end receivers with flexibility and portability. The specification also includes a special profile for portable reception.

These documents are also officially available at ABNT website.

== Summary ==
The performance levels for the Ginga middleware exceeds the current levels achieved by similar systems by using smaller and more efficient script languages, like Lua. Also, the combination of a procedural and declarative programming languages in one single system allow for the creating of a greater set of applications with minimum effort to the programmer. The transmission of interactive application within free-to-air programming will improve broadcasters relationship with its audience.

The documents describing the reference specification of Ginga are ABNT NBR 15606-1:2007 - Digital terrestrial television - Data coding and transmission specification - Part 1: Data coding; ABNT NBR 15606-2:2007 - Digital terrestrial television - Data coding and transmission specification - Part 2: Ginga-NCL for fixed and mobile receivers: XML application language for application coding; ABNT NBR 15606-3:2007- Digital terrestrial television - Data coding and transmission specification - Part 3: Data transmission specifications for digital broadcasting; and ABNT NBR 15606-5:2008 - Digital terrestrial television - Data coding and transmission specification – Part 5: Ginga-NCL for portable receivers: XML application language for application coding.
