= ABNT NBR 15603 =

- Multiplexing and service information (SI)
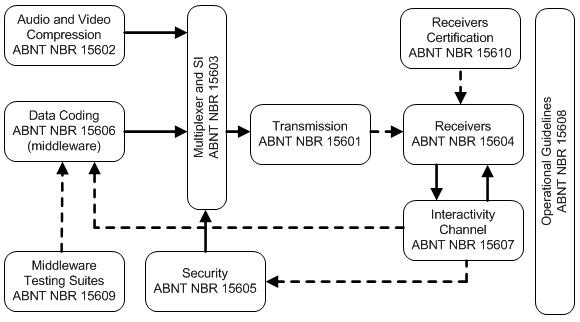
- SBTVD Standards Structure
- Native name: Spanish: Multiplexación y servicios de información (SI); Portuguese: Multiplexação e Serviços de Informação (SI)
- First published: November 11, 2007
- Latest version: 0.0; April 7, 2008

The ABNT NBR 15603 is the technical document of the SBTVD standards that describes in detail aspects regarding Multiplexing and service information (SI). The document is divided in 3 separate parts that covers: SI for digital broadcasting systems (Part 1); Data structure and definition of SI basic Information (Part 2); and Syntax and definition of SI extended information (Part 3).

The standard was written by telecommunications and television experts from many countries with their works coordinated by the SBTVD Forum and cover in detail all the aspects of video and audio coding that applies to SBTVD. The complete document can be found and downloaded freely in English, Spanish and Portuguese at ABNT's website.

== Introduction ==
The multiplexing and SI aspects of the Brazilian Digital Terrestrial Television Standards are described in the three documents published by ABNT, the Brazilian Association of Technical Standards (Associação Brasileira de Normas Técnicas), the ABNT NBR 15603-1:2007 - Digital terrestrial television - Multiplexing and service information (SI) - Part 1 SI for digital broadcasting systems; ABNT NBR 15603-2:2007 - Digital terrestrial television - Multiplexing and service information (SI) - Part 2: Data structure and definition of SI basic Information; and ABNT NBR 15603-3:2007 - Digital terrestrial television - Multiplexing and service information (SI) - Part 3: Syntax and definition of SI extended information.

The multiplexing and SI standard is very similar to ARIB equivalent keeping the data structure but with modified values for the parental control descriptor, genres and subgenres. The customized descriptor values reflect Brazilian laws, policies and culture.

== Document technical overview ==
This document specified set of tables for the Service Information is based on ARIB STD-B10 with the addition of the AVC and AAC descriptors, according to ETSI EN 300 468.

This standard specifies the basic configuration of service information used in digital broadcasting, detailed data structures of this service information, and operational guidelines. Service information consists of signals that complement the transmission control signals and program specific information as defined in MPEG-2 systems. It is provided to convey multiplexed program data to a receiver and to simplify program selection. The multiplexed-signal formats (PES packet, section format, TS packet, composition of the transmission control signal, composition of descriptors, composition of identifiers, and composition of related information are thoroughly listed.

The specification is intended to allow a wide range of applications and to integrate detailed data structures and usage guidelines with the basic configuration. The service information was specified under the preconditions of international compatibility in data structures, flexibility in accommodating various program configurations from different broadcasters, and extendibility with respect to future broadcast services.

The multiplexing and SI standard is very similar to ARIB equivalent keeping the data structure but with modified values for the parental control descriptor, genres and subgenres. The customized descriptor values reflect Brazilian laws, policies and culture.

These documents are also officially available at ABNT website.

== Summary ==
The multiplexing and SI requirements established for the Brazilian digital television standards make use of the same fundamental systems that also exist in the Japanese digital television standards as can be seen on ARIB STD-B10.

The three volumes of the multiplexing and SI standards are described in detail in documents: ABNT NBR 15603-1:2007 - Digital terrestrial television - Multiplexing and service information (SI) - Part 1 SI for digital broadcasting systems; ABNT NBR 15603-2:2007 - Digital terrestrial television - Multiplexing and service information (SI) - Part 2: Data structure and definition of SI basic Information; and ABNT NBR 15603-3:2007 - Digital terrestrial television - Multiplexing and service information (SI) - Part 3: Syntax and definition of SI extended information.
