= ABNT NBR 15607 =

- Interactivity channel
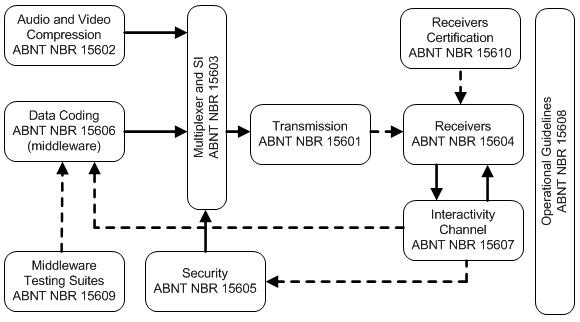
- SBTVD Standards Structure
- Native name: Spanish: Canal de interatividad; Portuguese: Canal de interatividade
- First published: March 3, 2008
- Latest version: 0.0; March 3, 2008

The standard ABNT NBR 15607-1:2008 - Digital terrestrial television – Interactivity channel establishes the ways in which a receiver device can send information back to the broadcaster through different communication mechanisms. The transmission of common broadcasting content will be done through the air through the main programming feed, while a more customized use of content can be sent through the interactive channel.

The standard was written by telecommunications and television experts from many countries with their works coordinated by the SBTVD Forum and cover in detail all the aspects of video and audio coding that applies to SBTVD. The complete document can be found and downloaded freely in English, Spanish and Portuguese at ABNT's website.

== Introduction ==
The interactivity channel aspects of the Brazilian Digital Terrestrial Television Standards are described in document ABNT NBR 15607-1:2008 - Digital terrestrial television – Interactivity channel -Part 1: Protocols, physical and software Interfaces, published by ABNT, the Brazilian Association of Technical Standards (Associação Brasileira de Normas Técnicas).

The standard establishes the ways in which a receiver device can send information back to the broadcaster through different communication means. The transmission of common broadcasting content will be done through the air through the main programming feed, while a more customized use of content can be sent through the interactive channel.

== Document technical overview ==
Brazilian proposal for the interactivity channel is focused on flexibility and is based on TCP/IP protocol. Receiver shall have a USB interface for an external Modem connection. This is adequate to comply with an existing telecomm infrastructure of multiple technologies and is also open for future innovations.

Also, the standard allows for many different possible ways of connecting a receiver device to a network, and use it as an interactivity channel. Future technologies in communications can be easily integrated in the proposed system.

These documents are also available at ABNT website.

== Summary ==
Interactivity channel is the name used for any communication mean that allows a receiver to send information back to the broadcaster. Some times called return channel, the name interactivity channel seems more correct since applications can be sent through the broadcast side and the through the channel itself.

The document describing the reference specification for the interactivity channel is ABNT NBR 15607-1:2008 - Digital terrestrial television – Interactivity channel -Part 1: Protocols, physical and software Interfaces.
