= ABNT NBR 15602 =

- Video coding, audio coding and multiplexing
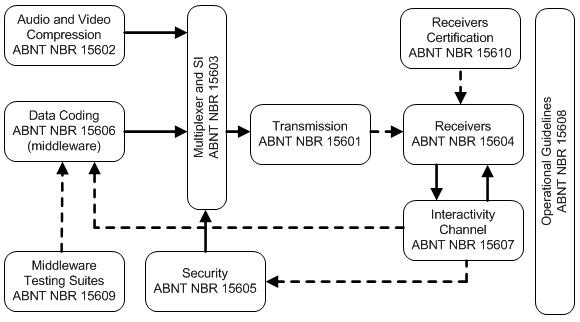
- SBTVD Standards Structure
- Native name: Spanish: Codificación de video, audio y multiplexación; Portuguese: Codificação de Vídeo, Áudio e Multiplexação
- First published: November 11, 2007
- Latest version: 0.0; November 11, 2007

The audio and video compression aspects of the Brazilian Digital Terrestrial Television Standards are described in the three documents published by ABNT, the Brazilian Association of Technical Standards (Associação Brasileira de Normas Técnicas), the ABNT NBR 15602-1:2007 - Digital terrestrial television - Video coding, audio coding and multiplexing - Part 1: Video coding; ABNT NBR 15602-2:2007 - Digital terrestrial television - Video coding, audio coding and multiplexing - Part 2: Audio coding; and ABNT NBR 15602-3:2007 - Digital terrestrial television - Video coding, audio coding and multiplexing - Part 3: Multiplexing signals.

The standard was written by telecommunications and television experts from many countries with their works coordinated by the SBTVD Forum and cover in detail all the aspects of video and audio coding that applies to SBTVD. The complete document can be found and downloaded freely in English, Spanish and Portuguese at ABNT's website.

== Introduction ==
Audio and video coding changes are some of the additional technological updates added to the standard. The adoption of Recommendation ITU-T H.264 (MPEG-4 AVC, Advanced Video Coding) as the compression tool allowed for a great leap in quality in all applications: from high definition to low resolution videos. The High Profile is the video compression profile adopted for SDTV and HDTV signals, while the Baseline Profile is used for 1-Seg content. Differently from the Japanese system, the coding level specified for the Brazilian system allows the deliver of low resolution video content of up to 30 frame/s for portable receivers. Audio coding has also seen improvements in the Brazilian specifications. The choice for the MPEG-4 AAC standard combines greater performance and flexibility with low signaling overhead.

== Document technical overview ==
The first part of this specification stipulates video input format (video signal, signal sample, scanning direction, video-signal parameters), video-coding scheme (a combination of the movement-compensation prediction coding, a block-based transform and a variable-length coding), compression procedures for the video signal and the transmission procedure thereof, signal construction following the coding, and constraints on the coding parameters.

MPEG-4 AVC profile and levels
	Service	Profile and Level	Resolution	Frame Rate
HDTV or SD	Fixed and Mobile	HP@L4.0	480, 720, 1080	30/1,001 and 60/1,001 Hz
Reduced Resolution	Portable	BP@L1.3	160x120, 160x90, 320x240, 320x180, 352x288	5, 10, 12, 15, 24 and 30 Hz

On general terms it can be said that the selected video coding scheme is a H.264 compression with two different profiles, one referring to the fixed high definition and standard definition transmission and the other to portable services. H.264 will be employed in all services; MPEG-2 will not be supported.

Note the error corrections tools of the H.264 baseline profile shall not be used. This was based upon the conclusion that the error resilient tools of H.264 are not effective compared to the applied error-correction coding of the transmission system and therefore the associated cost would have a negative impact on the cost-effectiveness of the portable receivers.

Further, the operating guidelines in the appendix specify the recommended technological conditions for actual operations concerning channel switching time and seamless switching.

MPEG-4 AAC profile and levels
	Service	Profile and Level	Number of channels	Max. AAC sampling rate
HDTV or SD	Fixed and Mobile	LC-AAC@L4 HE-AAC v1@L4	5	48 kHz
HDTV or SD	Fixed and Mobile	LC-AAC@L2 HE-AAC v1@L2	2	48 kHz
Reduced Resolution	Portable	HE-AAC v2@L2	2	48 kHz

The audio-coding scheme is a combination of the time-frequency conversion coding scheme and the auditory psychology-weighted bit allocation scheme as defined by MPEG-4 AAC encoding. The second part states the audio input signal, its sampling frequency, number of quantization bits, audio-coding scheme, compression procedures and transmission procedures for the audio. The basic constraints on the audio coding parameters are defined on the table 3.

Brazilian system is based on MPEG-4 HE-AAC v2, that is it includes de SBR (spectral band replication) and PS (parametric stereo) tools. Note that, in the High efficiency profile level 4 for one or two channels with SBR present, the maximum AAC sampling rate is 48 kHz. For more than two channels with SBR present, the maximum AAC sampling rate is 24 kHz.

These documents are also officially available at ABNT website.

== Summary ==
The audio and video compression requirements established for the Brazilian digital television standards make use of some of the most recent advances in technology available in the television market, maintaining commercial feasibility, and allowing for better picture quality and overall service perception.

The three volumes of the video and audio compression standards can be seen as evolutions suggested for better overall performance levels of the system: ABNT NBR 15602-1:2007 - Digital terrestrial television - Video coding, audio coding and multiplexing - Part 1: Video coding; ABNT NBR 15602-2:2007 - Digital terrestrial television - Video coding, audio coding and multiplexing - Part 2: Audio coding; and ABNT NBR 15602-3:2007 - Digital terrestrial television - Video coding, audio coding and multiplexing - Part 3: Multiplexing signals.
