= ABNT NBR 15601 =

- Transmission system
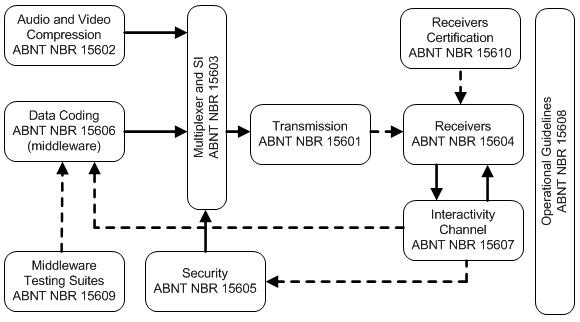
- SBTVD Standards Structure
- Native name: Sistema de Transmisión (Spanish); Sistema de Transmissão (Portuguese)
- First published: November 30, 2007
- Latest version: 0.0; November 30, 2007

ABNT NBR 15601 is the technical standard published by ABNT, the Brazilian Association of Technical Standards (Associação Brasileira de Normas Técnicas), that is responsible for addressing the aspects regarding transmission on the Brazilian Digital Terrestrial Television Standards, also known as SBTVD or ISDB-T version B.

The document covers a vast number of issues regarding detailed characteristics of transmitters and is essential to the proper understanding and manufacturing of equipment aimed at Digital TV market in Brazil. The writing and discussions on the technical standard was performed by the SBTVD Forum (Fórum SBTVD).

The standard was written by telecommunications and television experts from many countries with their works coordinated by the SBTVD Forum and cover in detail all the aspects of video and audio coding that applies to SBTVD.

== Introduction ==
The transmission aspects of the Brazilian Digital Terrestrial Television Standards are described in the ABNT NBR 15601:2007 - Digital terrestrial television - Transmission system document published by ABNT, the Brazilian Association of Technical Standards (Associação Brasileira de Normas Técnicas).

Digital terrestrial television broadcasting in Brazil should be introduced in the VHF/UHF bands and fit into existing 6 MHz channels originally intended for analogue television transmission. The Digital Terrestrial Television Broadcasting service will coexist with existing analogue television transmissions for a temporary period.

It was desirable to support the simultaneous transmission of a hierarchy of nested quality levels, including high definition television (HDTV) and standard definition TV (SDTV) within a single channel.

== Document technical overview ==
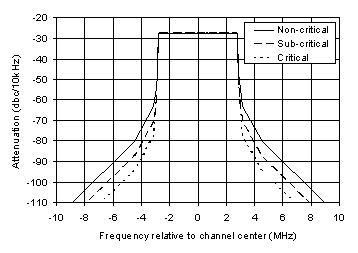
SBTVD emission mask for transmitter manufacturers

The ABNT NBR 15601:2007 - Digital terrestrial television - Transmission system document describes modulation and channel coding for the Brazilian system, which is identical to the Japanese ISDB-T system and ITU-R System C. The transmission system was selected after extensive comparative test and based on the methodology and results of ITU Report BT.2035.

Similarly to the European and Japanese approaches it specifies the digitally modulated signal in order to allow compatibility of equipment developed by different manufactures.

As a general description, the following processes shall be applied to the transport stream: error-correction coding, time-interleaving and carrier modulation. The channel coding is conducted in units of OFDM segments as in ISDB-T. A set of segments defines a hierarchical layer, where the above-mentioned parameters can be specified independently. Up to three hierarchical layers can be provided, which include the partial reception layer defined by the central segment. In addition to the framing information, Brazilian specification includes the spectral composition for the hierarchical transmission, the means of sending multiple signals, and multiple tables in different layers.

The specification group has proposed three different emission masks to cope with the Brazilian planning scenario.

All high power stations shall operate with critical mask except in the absence of installed or planned adjacent channel. All the other stations shall operate with the sub-critical mask above, except for the following conditions:

1. In the absence of either digital or analogue adjacent channels, planned or installed in the same locality, the emission mask might be non-critical;
2. In the presence of analogue adjacent channel, the emission mask shall be critical;
3. In the presence of digital adjacent channel with a power difference higher than 3 dB, the emission mask shall be critical;
4. In the presence of digital adjacent channel with a distance between the radiating systems longer than 1.300 feet (or 400 meters), the emission mask shall be critical.

These documents are also officially available at ABNT website.

== Summary ==
Transmission requirements established for the Brazilian digital television standards comply with the general characteristics existing in its Japanese counterpart, while addressing the challenges of broadcasting within a more polluted and unregulated spectrum environment.

The additional requirements set by the document ABNT NBR 15601:2007 - Digital terrestrial television – Transmission can be seen as evolutions suggested for better overall performance levels in the transition period between analog and digital television.
