= ABNT NBR 15608 =

- Operational guideline
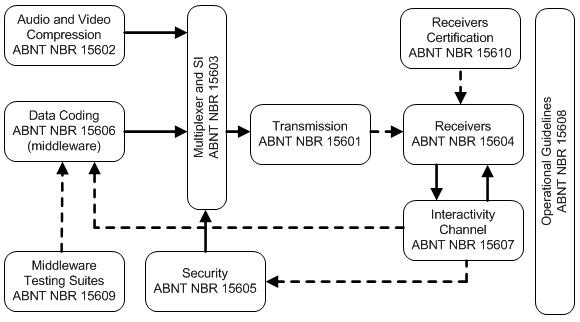
- SBTVD Standards Structure
- Native name: Spanish: Guia de operación; Portuguese: Guia de operação
- First published: August 22, 2008
- Latest version: 0.0; August 22, 2008

The standard ABNT NBR 15608 describes in further detail the parts of the digital television system that need clarifying, setting directives for implementation in a combination of mandatory and optional features. It can be seen as a refinement of the original specification documents focused on system implementation.

The standard was written by telecommunications and television experts from many countries with their works coordinated by the SBTVD Forum and cover in detail all the aspects of video and audio coding that applies to SBTVD. The complete document can be found and downloaded freely in English, Spanish and Portuguese at ABNT's website.

== Introduction ==
The operational guidelines aspects of the Brazilian Digital Terrestrial Television Standards are described in the following documents published by ABNT, the Brazilian Association of Technical Standards (Associação Brasileira de Normas Técnicas): ABNT NBR 15608-1:2008 - Digital terrestrial television - Operational guideline - Part 1: Transmission; ABNT NBR 15608-2:2008 - Digital terrestrial television - Operational guideline - Part 2: Video coding, audio coding and multiplexing; and ABNT NBR 15608-3:2008 - Digital terrestrial television - Operational guideline - Part 3: Multiplexing and SI/PSI Tables

The standard describes in further detail the parts of the digital television system that need clarifying, setting directives for implementation in a combination of mandatory and optional features. It can be seen as a refinement of the original specification documents focused on system implementation.

== Document technical overview ==
The standards are a flexible system allowing terrestrial broadcasters to choose from a variety of options to suit their various service environments. This allows the choice between fixed roof-top antenna, portable and even mobile reception of services. Broadly speaking the trade-off is of service bit-rate versus signal robustness. This way, operational guidelines play an important part in setting levels of performance and general paths for proper implementations by manufacturers and software developers.

The terrestrial digital television implementation is not only a technical and business challenge but also represents an effective means of giving access of the digital technology to all socio-economic segments of society. The upcoming work is the establishment of a test centre which is expected for the following months.

Brazilian digital television is in its early stages of development and implementation with a very promising future. Most of the component sub-systems are based on existing international standards, but used in an innovative and unique combination. The Brazilian DTTB system uses state-of-the-art technologies with no prejudice whatsoever to time-to-market of receivers in the one year range.

Economical aspects related to investments in broadcast equipment are also being carefully addressed. The implementation of DTTB in Brazil includes financing and special industrial policies that match the Latin America reality.

The ultimate goal of the whole process is to promote a smooth introduction of the free-to-air terrestrial digital television service with adequate levels of knowledge and confidence throughout the whole productive chain, with an ultimate positive impact to the Brazilian society.

These documents are also officially available at ABNT website.

== Summary ==
Operational guidelines are interpretations of the technical standards aimed at the implementations required for a specific case. It also serves as a baseline approach to developers and manufacturers seeking compliance with the rest of the system.

The documents describing the operational guidelines are ABNT NBR 15608-1:2008 - Digital terrestrial television - Operational guideline - Part 1: Transmission; ABNT NBR 15608-2:2008 - Digital terrestrial television - Operational guideline - Part 2: Video coding, audio coding and multiplexing; and ABNT NBR 15608-3:2008 - Digital terrestrial television - Operational guideline - Part 3: Multiplexing and SI/PSI Tables
