= ABNT NBR 15604 =

- Receivers
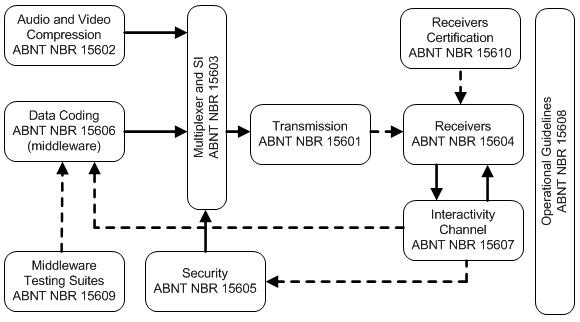
- SBTVD Standards Structure
- Native name: Spanish: Receptores; Portuguese: Receptores
- First published: September 30, 2007
- Latest version: 0.0; April 7, 2008

The ABNT NBR 15604 is the document that describes in detail the mandatory and optional functions and features of receivers for the SBTVD. It's essential for the correct implementation by manufacturers of either fixed, mobile or portable receivers aimed at the Brazilian Digital TV market.

The standard was written by telecommunications and television experts from many countries with their works coordinated by the SBTVD Forum and cover in detail all the aspects of video and audio coding that applies to SBTVD. The complete document can be found and downloaded freely in English, Spanish and Portuguese at ABNT's website.

== Introduction ==
The receiver configuration aspects of the Brazilian Digital Terrestrial Television Standards are described in a document published by ABNT, the Brazilian Association of Technical Standards (Associação Brasileira de Normas Técnicas), the ABNT NBR 15604:2007 - Digital terrestrial television – Receivers.

The receiver standardization document elaborates on the common requirements and optional features that might be available on the receiver side of the digital television communication. Providing a common ground work for the expected behavior of devices under a common set of rules.

== Document technical overview ==
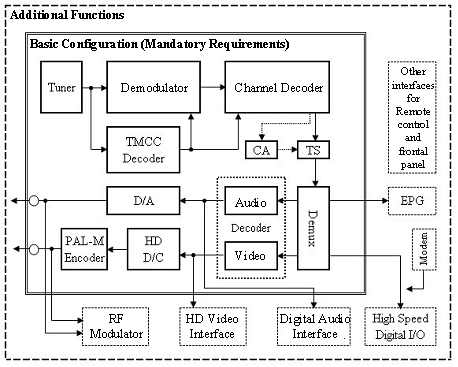
SBTVD Basic receiver configuration

The Brazilian technical standard for digital television concerns specifications of receivers for digital broadcasting, and specifies, in particular, minimum basic functions and essential requirements to satisfy initial needs for the deployment of digital terrestrial television broadcasting. The standard does not cover features which affect the quality of the displayed picture or application rather than whether receiver is able to decode pictures at all. Such issues are left to the marketplace.

Wherever practical the Brazilian standard suggests implementations that ignore reserved and private information and allows for future compatible extensions to the bit-stream.

In order to maintain user habit, Brazilians have defined a code to keep, in the digital format, the same channel numbers used in analogue broadcasting, thus making it possible to have an analogue to digital transition with maximum transparency. The code is called virtual channel numbering.

These documents are also officially available at ABNT website.

== Summary ==
The requirements established for receivers in the Brazilian digital television standard allow for a variety of receiver models with many possible combinations of optional features, while maintaining the basic common required features expected for high quality of service.

The ABNT NBR 15604:2007 - Digital terrestrial television – Receivers describes in detail the required and optional features for the system on the receiver side.
