= ABNT NBR 15605 =

- Security issues
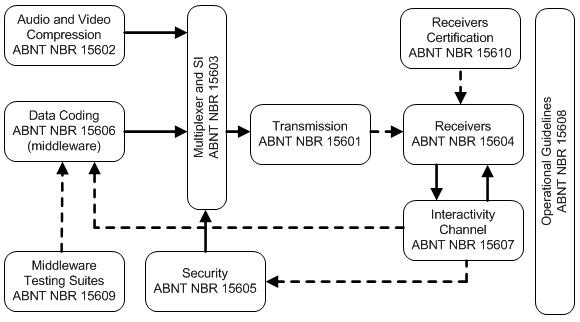
- SBTVD Standards Structure
- Native name: Spanish: Tópicos de seguridad; Portuguese: Tópicos de segurança
- First published: November 11, 2007
- Latest version: 0.0; August 8, 2008

The ABNT NBR 15605 is the technical document of the SBTVD standards that describes in detail aspects regarding content security issues and copy protection, also known as digital rights management (DRM). It's a detailed reference for manufacturers and content providers that aim to coordinate transmission and reception protection systems in a transparent and effective way for mass viewing.

The standard was written by telecommunications and television experts from many countries with their works coordinated by the SBTVD Forum and cover in detail all the aspects of video and audio coding that applies to SBTVD. The complete document can be found and downloaded freely in English, Spanish and Portuguese at ABNT's website.

== Introduction ==
The security aspects of the Brazilian Digital Terrestrial Television Standards are described in a document published by ABNT, the Brazilian Association of Technical Standards (Associação Brasileira de Normas Técnicas), the ABNT NBR 15605:2008 – Digital terrestrial television – Security issues – Copy control.

The standard addresses the topic of protection of the transmitted content against its inappropriate and unauthorized use through the use of communication protected protocols and interfaces. The document also elaborates on the security aspects required for applications transmitted over the air and access to specific portions of a receivers hardware.

== Document technical overview ==
In order to protect the contents of digital terrestrial television broadcasting, the standard defines rules regarding interfaces and recording media. This means the content protection information transmitted by broadcasting stations shall be reflected on all the interfaces between receiver units and peripheral equipment.

Internationally available copy-protection tools are defined for the digital video output, audio output and high-speed interfaces. All digital outputs (e.g.: HDMI, DVI, etc.) shall be protected by HDCP and DTCP. Additionally the resolution of the analogue video output must be limited to 350.000 pixels, equivalent to standard definition, whenever a copy protection signaling is transmitted.

Defined implementation criteria ensure receiver units to be designed and manufactures in such a way that acts of defeating or bypassing the function requirements are effectively prevented.

These documents are also officially available at ABNT website.

== Summary ==
The requirements established for security in the Brazilian digital television standard are in line with the current set of technical protection measures commonly used worldwide for security of free-to-air high definition content.

The ABNT NBR 15605:2008 – Digital terrestrial television – Security issues – Copy control describes in detail the required security features and limitations that must be applied on the receivers side in order to allow for protection against unauthorized use of information and content.
