= NCL Eclipse =

Software application

NCL Eclipse is a plugin for Eclipse IDE to assist in the development of Nested Context Language (NCL) applications. NCL is the standard declarative language for ISDB-Tb (International System for Digital Broadcast Terrestrial Brazilian) and also is ITU-T standard for IPTV systems. NCL Eclipse was first developed by Laws Lab, and it is currently jointly maintained by Laws and TeleMidia Labs.

NCL Eclipse is free software, available at the Brazilian Public Software Portal under GNU GPLv2 license.

As an Eclipse IDE plug-in, NCL Eclipse can be integrated with other plug-ins: for instance, those supporting other ISDB-Tb and ITU-T standard languages (such as Lua and Java).

== Version History ==
=== NCL Eclipse 1.0 ===
The first stable version of NCL Eclipse was named "NCL Eclipse 1.0". This version has included support for syntax highlighting, folding (which allows the author to hide parts of source code according to their needs), wizards to create documents, auto-formatting, document, marking error validation, contextual content suggestion, and an outline view (which shows the document content as a tree). To provide the marking error validation, all NCL Eclipse versions use the NCL Validator (validation framework of NCL documents).

=== NCL Eclipse 1.4 ===
NCL Eclipse 1.1, 1.2, and 1.3 mainly provided bug fixes found in NCL Eclipse 1.0. NCL Eclipse 1.4 brought program visualization, media previews, and hypertext navigation. Additionally, a new plug-in aimed to integrate NCL Eclipse with NCL Club was included in the same package. The internationalization support for English, Spanish, and Portuguese was also included in this version.

=== NCL Eclipse 1.5 ===
The latest stable and current version is "NCL Eclipse 1.5". This version contains some improvements in the source code. As a new feature, this version came with support for semi-automatic error correction and the option to run the NCL document, provided by a virtual machine running the Ginga-NCL emulator.
