= Low poly =

3D computer graphics mesh with low number of polygons

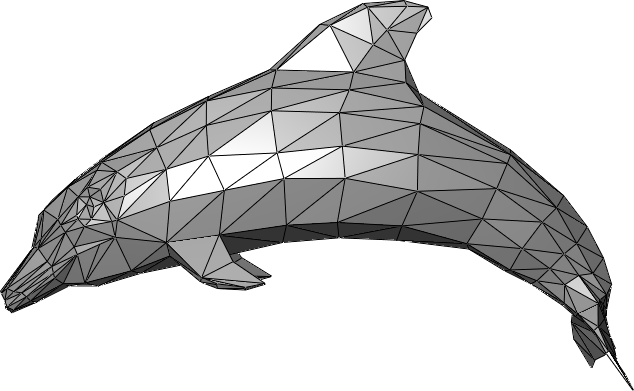
Polygonal mesh with wireframe representing a dolphin, a low poly model by modern standards

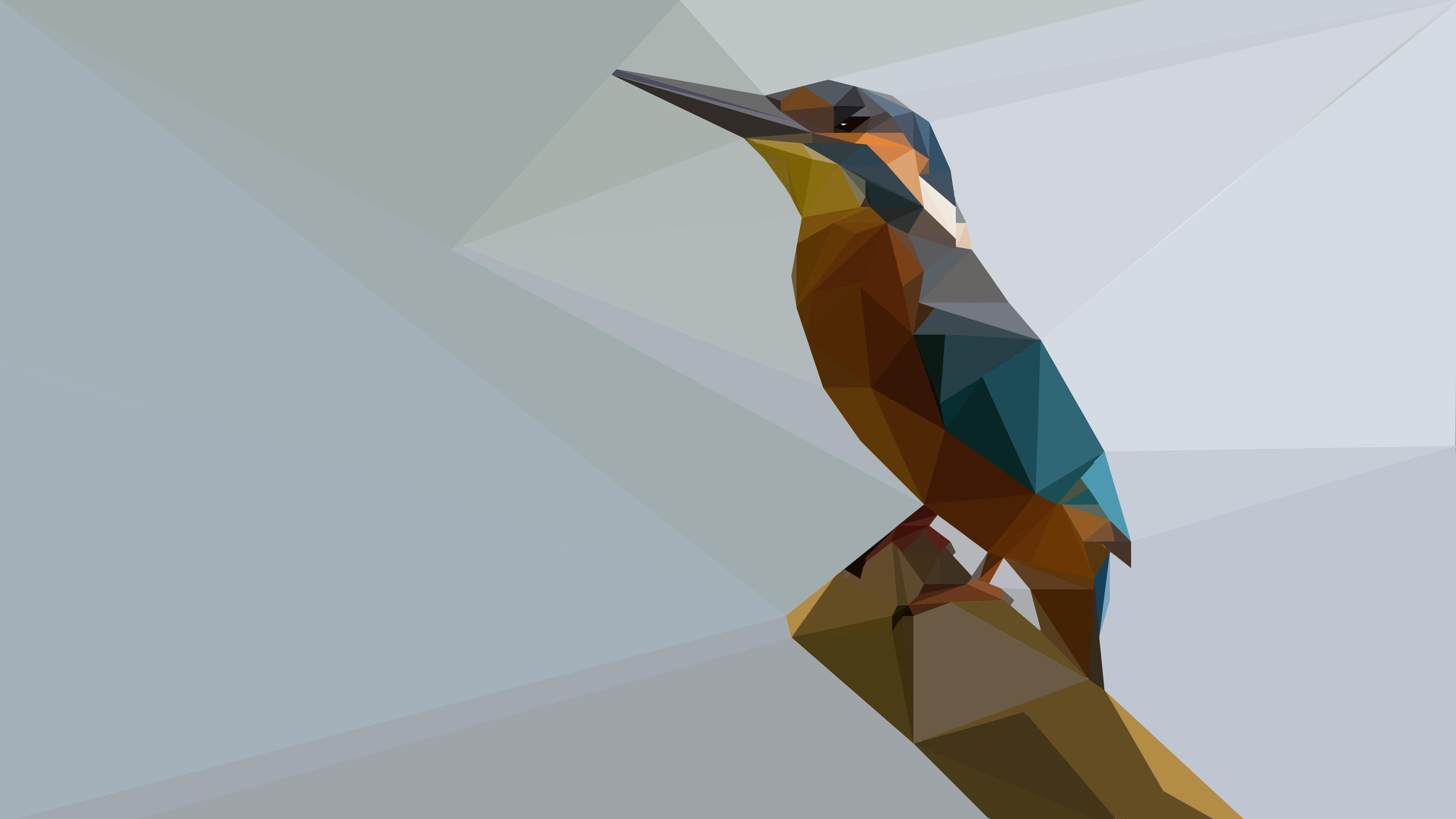
Colored low-poly art depicting a Kingfisher

Low poly is a polygon mesh in 3D computer graphics that has a relatively small number of polygons. Low poly meshes occur in real-time applications (e.g. games) as contrast with high poly meshes in animated movies and special effects of the same era. The term low poly is used in both a technical and a descriptive sense; the number of polygons in a mesh is an important factor to optimize for performance but can give an undesirable appearance to the resulting graphics.

Derived from 3D objects with a low polygon content is low poly art, a minimalistic and non-photorealistic art style in which images or figures are created from a network of just a few connected points.

== Motivation ==
A low-poly STL model of an elephant comprising only 346 triangles (external viewer) (compare with this high-poly one made of 1.89 million triangles)

Polygon meshes are one of the major methods of modelling a 3D object for display by a computer. Polygons can, in theory, have any number of sides but are commonly broken down into triangles for display. In general the more triangles in a mesh the more detailed the object is, but the more computationally intensive it is to display. In order to decrease render times (i.e. increase frame rate) the number of triangles in the scene must be reduced, by using low poly meshes.

Computer graphics techniques such as normal and bump mapping have been designed to compensate for the decrease of polygons by making a low poly object appear to contain more detail than it does. This is done by altering the shading of polygons to contain internal detail which is not in the mesh.

== Polygon budget ==
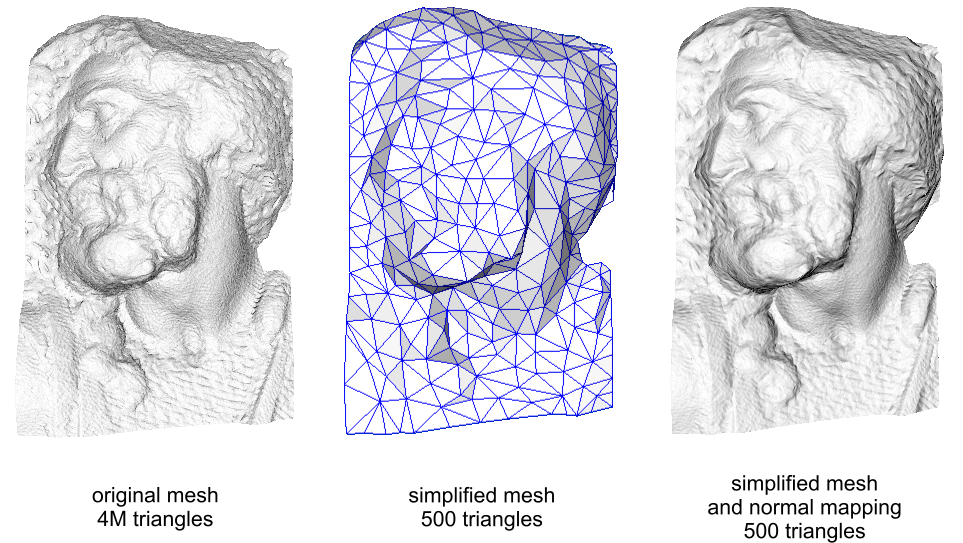
An example of normal mapping used to add detail to a low-poly (500 triangle) mesh

A combination of the game engine or rendering method and the computer being used defines the polygon budget; the number of polygons which can appear in a scene and still be rendered at an acceptable frame rate. Therefore, the use of low poly meshes are mostly confined to computer games and other software a user must manipulate 3D objects in real time because processing power is limited to that of a typical personal computer or games console and the frame rate must be high. Computer generated imagery, for example, for films or still images have a higher polygon budget because rendering does not need to be done in real-time, which requires higher frame rates. In addition, computer processing power in these situations is typically less limited, often using a large network of computers or what is known as a render farm. Each frame can take hours to create, despite the enormous computer power involved. A common example of the difference this makes is full motion video sequences in computer games which, because they can be pre-rendered, look much smoother than the games themselves.

== Aesthetic ==
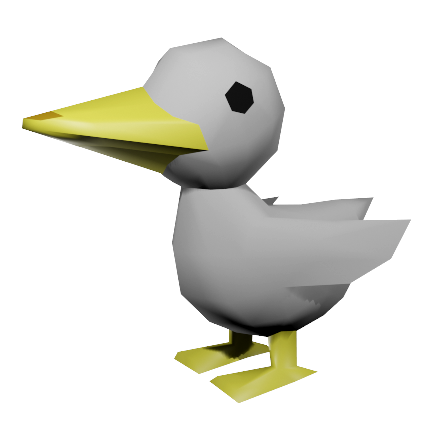
3D model of a duck consisting of 220 polygons

Models that are said to be low poly often appear blocky and simple while still maintaining the basic shape of what they are meant to represent. With computer graphics getting more powerful, it has become increasingly computationally cheap to render low poly graphics. Some artists use the resulting low-detail from a low polygon count as an aesthetic rather than as an optimization technique. They are often used by indie developers due to being faster and cheaper to create. In addition, there is an element of nostalgia to low poly styles, hearkening to older video game consoles such as the Nintendo 64, the PlayStation, the Dreamcast, the PlayStation 2 and the GameCube. Since they often achieve a certain retro style, low poly models serve as a 3-dimensional analog to 2-dimensional pixel art.

== History ==
=== Low poly as a relative term ===
There is no defined threshold for a mesh to be low poly; low poly is always a relative term and depends on (amongst other factors):

- The time the meshes were designed and for what hardware
- The detail required in the final mesh
- The shape and properties of the object in question

As computing power inevitably increases, the number of polygons that can be used increases too. For example, Super Mario 64 would be considered low poly today, but was considered a stunning achievement when it was released in 1996. Similarly, in 2018, using hundreds of polygons on a leaf in the background of a scene would be considered high poly, but using that many polygons on the main character would be considered low poly. In this way, there is a relativism between the importance of objects and their graphical quality. More important objects such as Non-player characters usually contain a higher amount of detail than less important objects, which are often small or in the background, like a blade of grass. This relativism is subverted when low poly is used as an intentional aesthetic style: every object shares the simplicity that a low number of polygons brings, which makes the distinction between important features and unimportant features less clear.

Example of using low poly stylistically for a camping scene

=== Emergence as an aesthetic style ===
Low poly graphics emerged around late 2013 as a specific style when content creators began to redefine the difference between high poly and low poly. Instead of using a low number of polygons as a necessity, creators like Timothy J. Reynolds recognized how the usage of fewer polygons sharpens the focus on essential artistic elements like form, lighting, and texture. The emergence of the style is somewhat similar to earlier artistic movements where artists like Paul Cézanne tried to decompose objects into geometric shapes. The low poly style seeks to highlight the idea that the world can be represented by a composition of shapes, which makes it a self aware style that is intentionally vague.

=== In video games ===
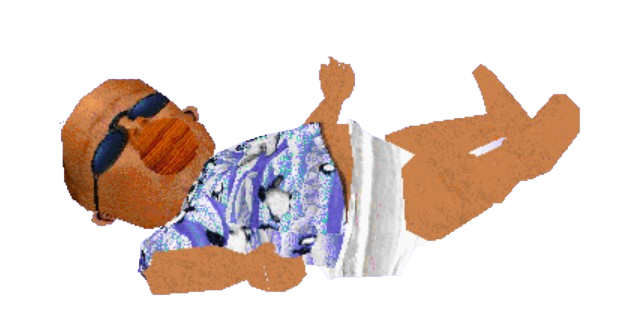
A model of a baby from 1995's 3D Movie Maker, which is stylised to appear realistic to the best of its hardware's ability, unlike modern low poly artwork that exists in direct and intentional contrast to realism

Video game graphics from the fifth generation of video game consoles, during which some of the first consoles capable of rendering 3D graphics were released, used low poly modeling due to technological limitations. This carried over onto the sixth generation of video game consoles, but as graphics and console rendering power improved, the vast majority of video games moved on to more realistic graphics with higher polygon counts, though low poly models are still frequently used for smaller, less-detailed objects that are not intended to be focused on.

The use of low poly graphics as a unique art direction in video games emerged around the late 2000s or early-to-mid 2010s. The oldest game on the popular game distribution service Steam with the tag "low poly" is Mirror Moon EP, a space-themed exploration game with an emphasis on the low poly style, which was released in September 2013. In 2014, Richard Whitelock published Into this Wylde Abyss, a short, story driven survival game with a similarly low poly style. Since then, the number of low poly games has expanded quickly; from 2014 to 2018, there were 244 titles published on Steam using the low poly tag.

Although it has gained some traction in the art world, low poly is a much more established style in video games, most commonly indie games, since it gives the game fairly unique visuals and less-demanding graphics while also reducing development time. It is also sometimes used in tandem with visual or graphical effects to evoke or directly imitate video game graphics from the fifth and sixth generations of video game consoles.

Some of the most notable low poly games released since the late-2010s include Superhot, Necropolis, Grow Up, Totally Accurate Battle Simulator, Totally Accurate Battlegrounds, Ravenfield, and BattleBit Remastered.

== In physics engines ==
Physics engines have presented a new role for low poly meshes. Simpler meshes allow for less complex collision detection calculations in which extra detail would be unnecessary.

== See also ==
- Anisotropic filtering – Method of enhancing the image quality of textures on surfaces of computer graphics
- Bump mapping – Texturing technique for bumps/wrinkles in computer graphics
- Normal mapping – Texture mapping technique
- Nurbs – Method of representing curves and surfaces in computer graphics
- Polygon (computer graphics) – Set of polygons to define the surface of a 3D model
- Sprite (computer graphics) – 2D bitmap displayed over a larger scene
- Voxel – Element representing a value on a grid in three dimensional space
