= Kylo (web browser) =

Discontinued web browser

- Developer: Hillcrest Labs
- Release: March 19, 2010
- Engine: Gecko
- Operating system: Windows (XP SP2 and later), Mac OS X
- Available in: English
- Type: Web browser
- Website: kylo.tv

Kylo is a discontinued open-source web browser developed by Hillcrest Labs for Microsoft Windows and Mac OS X. Initially released in 2010, the browser features a 10-foot user interface, with large fonts and buttons that make it easy to see from across the room, making it especially suitable for use with a home theater PC connected directly to a high-definition television.

In 2011, Kylo was a CES (Consumer Electronics Show) Innovations Awards honoree in the category of online audio/video content.

On May 15, 2012, Kylo was released as open source software under the terms of the Mozilla Public License

It was supported by the first Asus Xtion 3D depth-sensing camera, launched in spring 2012 and was included in the software bundle shipped with the camera.

The browser was abandoned after Hillcrest was acquired by CEVA in July 2019.

== See also ==
- Home theater PC
- Smart TV
- Interactive television
- Internet television
