= Nexign =

Russian billing company

nexign
- Formerly: Peter-Service (Russian: Петер-Сервис)
- Type: Joint stock company
- Industry: Telecommunications
- Founded: 1992; 34 years ago
- Headquarters: Saint Petersburg, Russia
- Key people: Matyushin Mikhail Vladimirovich (CEO)
- Number of employees: 1800 (2020)
- Website: nexign.com

nexign is a billing company in Russia that provided the first Russian billing system for mobile operators. The company was established in 1992 as Peter-Service (Russian: Петер-Сервис).

Nexign is owned by public joint stock company, "Megafon".

== History ==
Nexign was founded in 1992 in Saint Petersburg, Russia, under the name Peter-Service by the developers of the billing system for the first Russian cell phone carrier Delta Telecom. In 1994, the company also launched a billing system for landline telecom operator Peterstar. That effectively made Nexign the first company in Russia to create business support systems for telecom operators. The projects for Delta Telecom and Peterstar provided the basis for the company's first packaged information and billing solution, Peter-Service BIS, which was among the first billing systems certified by the Ministry of Communication of Russia.

Since 2000, Nexign (Peter-Service) has expanded its portfolio with Roaming support systems (RSS), interconnected billing systems (ITC), convergent billing systems (BISrt), and other products for telcos. The company expanded to other regions of Russia, opened new offices, and strengthened the professional capacity. In February 2018, Peter-Service adopted a new brand name Nexign. In December of the same year, it was acquired by ICS-Holding. Under the new name, the company adopted a strategy focused on expansion to the Middle East and Africa (MEA), Southeast Asia (SEA), Central and Eastern Europe (CEE) markets with new BSS solutions for digital transformation of CSPs, a network monetization suite, and an IoT platform.

According to documents released by WikiLeaks in September 2017, Peter-Service had allegedly developed data retention (DRS) and traffic analysis instruments for the SORM system. The company responded that it doesn't have access to user data of CSPs, had never shared any information with authorities, and has no government contracts.

== Subsidiaries ==
- In 2021 Nexign established a systems integrator Nexign Solution, which focuses on projects that incorporate Nexign products and services.
- In October 2020 Nexign acquired a 99% stake in Storm Technologies, the developer of automated digital customer experience management systems.

== Area Served ==
Nexign holds dominant positions on its home market in Russia and the CIS region for its BSS portfolio, and focuses on expansion to MEA (Middle East and Africa), SEA (Southeast Asia), and Latin America. The company is headquartered in Saint Petersburg and has local offices in Moscow, Samara, Yekaterinburg, Krasnodar, Vladivostok, Nizhny Novgorod, Rostov-on-Don, and Novosibirsk. The international offices are located in Istanbul, Dubai, and Santo Domingo.

Nexign provides services to over 50 CSPs in 16 countries, including high-profile customers such as Chinguitel, Gazprom, Geocell, Megafon, Moldcell, MTS, Rostelecom, Turkcell. While initially Nexign used the direct sales model, thus ensuring autonomy and reducing the complexity of working with third parties, starting in the ate 2010s, the company started to build relations with systems integrators on the new markets

Nexign has partnerships with Oracle, Red Hat, Sandvine, NETS International, and Giza Systems. The company is a member of Russoft, Samena Telecommunications Council, OneM2M, 3GPP, ETSI, TM Forum, The Industrial Internet Association, and The Internet of Things Association.
