= Hillcrest Labs =

American technology company

- Logo
- Formerly: Hillcrest Communications
- Industry: technology
- Founded: 2001
- Founder: Dan Simpkins
- Successor: CEVA (2019)
- Headquarters: Rockville, Maryland
- Products: Loop pointer; HoME television navigation system; Kylo browser
- Website: www.hillcrestlabs.com

Hillcrest Labs was a sensor processing technology company that developed free space motion-control technology and the first motion-controlled remote for television. Hillcrest also invented the first graphical zoomable interface for television and Kylo, the first Web browser optimized for television. The company, based in Rockville, Maryland, was acquired by CEVA in July 2019.

== History ==
Founded in 2001 as Hillcrest Communications, the company changed its name to Hillcrest Laboratories in 2005. Founder Dan Simpkins, who had previously founded SALIX technologies, believed that television content was becoming increasingly difficult to navigate, and he wanted to make it easier. To that end, Hillcrest developed Freespace motion sensing technology, which translates a user's gestures into screen motion. This allows a remote control to operate as a mouse for the television. The company also developed a graphical, zoomable interface for television content. Early investors included Grotech Ventures, New Enterprise Associates, and Columbia Capital.

=== Timeline ===
In 2006, Hillcrest introduced its first products: the Loop pointer and the Home television navigation system, with a graphical, zoomable interface.

In 2007, Logitech licensed Hillcrest's technology for the MX Air, a mouse that could be used in the air.

In 2008, Hillcrest licensed its technology to Kodak, for the Kodak Theater HD Player and Pointer Remote. Also in 2008, Universal Electronics and Texas Instruments licensed Freespace for use in remote controls.

In 2009, Hillcrest released the Loop pointer for sale directly to consumers. PC World Magazine named The Loop pointer one of the “top 100 products of the year” and one of the “greatest tech designs ever.”

In 2010, Hillcrest released the Kylo browser, a free web browser for Microsoft Windows and Mac OS X, optimized for viewing on a TV screen. Hulu blocked users of Kylo from accessing the site. Hillcrest released a new version that worked with Hulu, and Hulu blocked it again. Also in 2010, LG came out with the Magic Motion remote, which used Hillcrest's technology to allow users to change channels with gestures.

In 2011, Hillcrest raised new funding from NEA, AllianceBernstein, Columbia Capital, and Grotech Ventures.

On December 20, 2016, InterDigital announced the acquisition of Hillcrest Labs.

In January 2018, Hillcrest Labs launched its FSP200 processor.

On July 22, 2019, CEVA announced the acquisition of Hillcrest Labs.

== Technology and products ==
=== Freespace Motion Control Technology ===
Freespace Motion Control Technology combined motion algorithms with MEMS accelerometers, gyroscopes, and other sensors to translate physical motions into cursor movement. The software compensates for human tremor and inadvertent movement, generating natural cursor movement.

The Freespace Motion Engine software was embedded in the Roku 2 "game remote", released in 2011, which uses Freespace to control Roku's streaming players. Freespace is also used by LG for its Smart TVs and Magic Motion Remote. The Logitech MX Air Mouse uses Freespace, and Popular Mechanics called this mouse the “best pointer we’ve tried.” Another Freespace-enabled product is the Universal Electronics remote control.

Freespace allows users to control images on a screen by using intuitive motions, allowing for a more natural method of interacting with television content compared to directional pads. It is currently used in several products, such as the Magic Motion motion-sensing remote controls that come with some of LG Electronics’ televisions. Other licensees of Freespace include Logitech, Sony's videogame division, Roku, Universal Electronics, and Zillion TV.

=== The Loop pointer ===
The Loop pointer, enabled by Hillcrest's Freespace technology, was designed to act as a mouse for television. Similar to the LG Magic Remote, the Loop senses the viewer's wrist movements and translates the gestures into onscreen movement. It has four buttons and a scroll wheel. The Loop doesn't need to be pointed at the PC, or have a direct line of sight.

=== The Scoop pointer ===
The Scoop pointer is a Freespace-enabled in-air mouse that succeeded its heavier Loop predecessor. It has nine buttons and a scroll wheel.

=== Kylo web browser ===
Kylo was a free web browser that was optimized for the TV screen with a 10-foot user interface. It has large fonts and buttons, and an onscreen keyboard. The Kylo browser was released in March 2010, and was available for Microsoft Windows and Mac OS X. It was discontinued in 2019.

== Legal ==
On August 19, 2008, Hillcrest Laboratories filed a complaint against Nintendo with the U.S International Trade Commission, alleging that the Wii Remote infringed on three of its patents. A fourth Hillcrest patent (for graphical interfaces displayed on television screens) was also allegedly violated. Hillcrest sought a ban on Wii consoles imported to the U.S. On August 24, 2009, Nintendo and Hillcrest reached a settlement, although the terms were not publicly disclosed.

== Awards ==
- CES Best of Innovations in the video accessories category (2006)
- Popular Mechanics Editors Choice (2007)
- The Gazette of Politics and Business 25 CEOs You Need to Know (2008)
- Washington Smart CEO Future 50 (2009)
- PC World Top 100 (2009)
- CES Innovations Design and Engineering Award Honoree (2010, 2011, 2012)
