= Global Standards Collaboration =

Organization

The Global Standards Collaboration (GSC) is an organization that started as The Inter-regional Telecommunications Standards conference (ITSC) in 1990. This was an initiative of the T1 Committee of the United States who invited the other founding partner organizations ITU-T, ETSI and the Japanese TTC to the first ISC Meeting in Fredericksburg, VA. The goal was set by the "spirit of Melbourne", stemming from a CCITT Plenary Assembly, to find a way of co-operation between Participating Standards Organizations (PSOs) from different regions of the world in order to facilitate global standardization within the ITU (International Telecommunication Union). The ITSC focussed its work on fixed telecommunications networks.

After a few years, the ITSC, as a conference, became too big and was therefore reduced to GSC, the Global Standards Collaboration, with delegations limited to a reasonable size (10 maximum). The first GSC meeting was held in 1994 in Melbourne, Australia. Around the same time, it was decided to expand the scope to cover Radio Communications with the addition of a parallel set of Global Radio Standardization (RAST) meeting, the first one being hosted by ETSI in Nice in October 1994.

In the course of the time, the Australian, Canadian, Korean and Chinese national standards organizations joined bringing the number of Participating Standards Organizations to ten. Observers from other standards-related organizations and fora are also invited to participate.

In November 2001, it was renamed to GTSC (where T = Telecoms) and RAST as GRSC (where R = Radio) and to use the term GSC an overall "umbrella" for the combined plenary sessions.

GSC meets approximately once every year. GSC-16 was held in Halifax, Nova Scotia, from October 31 to November 3, 2011 hosted by the ICT Standards Advisory Council of Canada (ISACC).

== Participating standards organizations ==
- ARIB – Association of Radio Industries and Businesses (Japan)
- ATIS – Alliance for Telecommunications Industry Solutions (USA)
- CA – Communications Alliance Ltd (Australia) (withdrawn in 2010)
- CCSA – China Communications Standards Association (China)
- ETSI – European Telecommunications Standards Institute (France)
- IEC – International Electrotechnical Commission (Switzerland)
- IEEE – Institute of Electrical and Electronics Engineers (USA)
- ISO – International Organization for Standardization (Switzerland)
- ISACC – ICT Standards Advisory Council of Canada (Canada) (Withdrawn)
- ITU-R / ITU-T – International Telecommunication Union (Switzerland)
- TIA – Telecommunications Industry Association (USA)
- TSDSI – Telecommunications Standards Development Society of India (India)
- TTA – Telecommunications Technology Association (Korea)
- TTC – Telecommunication Technology Committee (Japan)

== GSC10 Open Standards Definition ==
According to the participating standards organizations, an open standard fulfills the following conditions:

- Collaborative/consensus based development and/or approval
- Transparent process
- Inclusive
- RAND/FRAND Intellectual Property Right (IPR) policies
- Standard is published and made available to the general public under reasonable terms (including for reasonable fee or for free)

== See also ==
- Open standard
- Open specifications
- Standardization
- Machine to machine
