= SBTVD Forum =

Non-profit organization

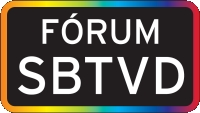
SBTVD Forum Logo

The SBTVD Forum is a non-profit organization of private and public companies responsible for the general aspects of Digital TV deployment in Brazil. The organization was founded in 2007 in order to address all technical issues regarding the upcoming SBTVD standard, also known as ISDB-Tb (ISDB-T version B).

There are over 80 companies members of the SBTVD Forum ranging from all areas of the television industry, including broadcasters, receiver and transmitter manufacturers, universities, software industries and regulatory governmental agencies. Association to the SBTVD Forum is available for all companies regardless of nationality.

== Standards ==
One of the most important tasks of the SBTVD Forum is the development writing of the technical standards that describe the inner workings of digital television transmission and reception in the Brazil. The standard were written by telecommunications and television experts from many companies and universities and cover in detail all the aspects regarding SBTVD. The complete documents can be found and downloaded freely in English, Spanish and Portuguese at ABNT's website.

SBTVD Technical Standards
Name	Title
ABNT NBR 15601	Transmission system
ABNT NBR 15602	Video coding, audio coding and multiplexing
ABNT NBR 15603	Multiplexing and service information (SI)
ABNT NBR 15604	Receivers
ABNT NBR 15605	Security issues
ABNT NBR 15606	Data coding and transmission specification for digital broadcasting
ABNT NBR 15607	Interactivity channel
ABNT NBR 15608	Operational guideline
ABNT NBR 15609	Test suite
ABNT NBR 15610	Tests for receivers

== Modules and workgroups ==
The SBTVD Forum is the recognize entity for discussions and meetings about Digital TV in Brazil, and also play the role of technical consultant to the Brazilian Digital TV Development Committee, a governmental group responsible system regulation. There are four different Modules that addresses topics from separate perspectives: a Technical Module, a Marketing Module, an Intellectual Property Module and a Market Module.

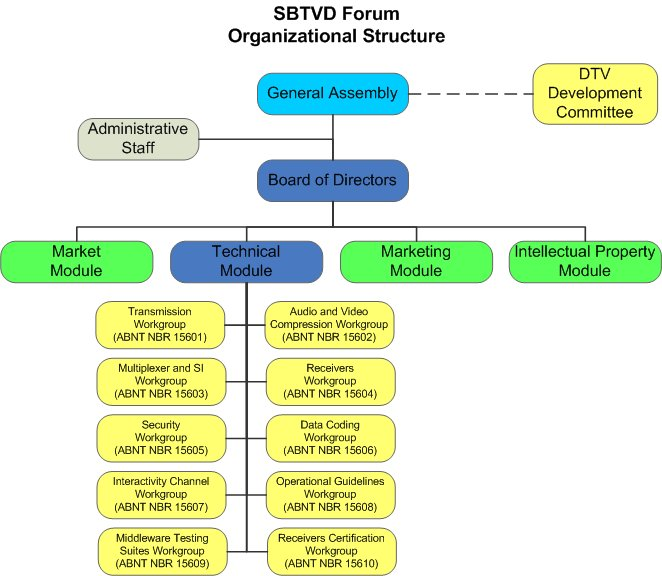
SBTVD Forum Organizational Structure

== Members ==
- Abril Radiodifusão S/A
- Canal Brasileiro da Informação – CBI Ltda
- Empreendimentos Radiodifusão Cabo Frio S/A
- Empresa Paulista de Televisão
- Fundação Cásper Líbero
- Fundação de Radiodifusão Futura
- Globo Comunicação e Participações S/A
- Globo Comunicação e Participações S/A - Filial de Belo Horizonte – MG
- Globo Comunicação e Participações S/A - Filial de Brasília – DF
- Globo Comunicação e Participações S/A - Filial de Recife – PE
- Globo Comunicação e Participações S/A - Filial de São Paulo – SP
- Rádio e Televisão Iguaçu S/A
- Radio e Televisão Record S/A
- Rádio e TV Bandeirantes Ltda
- Radio Televisão de Sergipe S/A
- Rádio TV do Amazonas Ltda - TV Rondônia
- RBS Participações S/A
- Shop Tour TV Ltda
- Sistema Clube de Comunicação Ltda
- Sistema Norte de Rádio e Televisão Ltda
- Sociedade Radio Emissora Paranaense S/A
- Televisão Liberal Ltda
- Televisão Ponta Porã Ltda
- Televisão Rio Formoso Ltda
- Televisão Verdes Mares Ltda
- TV SBT Canal 05 de Porto Alegre Ltda
- TV SBT Canal 11 do Rio de Janeiro Ltda
- TV SBT Canal 4 de São Paulo S/A
- TV Studio de Brasília Ltda
- LG Electronics da Amazonia Ltda
- Panasonic do Brasil Ltda
- Philips da Amazônia Industria Eletrônica Ltda
- Samsung Eletrônica da Amazônia Ltda
- Semp Toshiba Amazonas S/A
- Sony Brasil Ltda
- Centro de Excelência em Tecnologia Eletrônica Avançada - CEITEC
- Centro Federal de Educação Tecnológica do Ceará – CEFETCE
- Fraunhofer Gesellschaft zur Förderung der angewandten Forschung e.V.
- Fundação Centro de Análise, Pesquisa e Inovação Tecnológica - FUCAPI
- Fundação CPqD: Centro de Pesquisa e Desenvolvimento em Telecomunicações
- Fundação Instituto Nacional de Telecomunicações - INATEL
- Laboratório de Sistemas Integráveis da Escola Politécnica da Usp
- Pontificia Universidade Católica do Rio de Janeiro
- Pontifícia Universidade Católica do Rio Grande do Sul -PUCRS
- Universidade de Brasília
- Universidade do Vale do Rio dos Sinos - Unisinos
- Universidade Estadual de Campinas - Unicamp
- Universidade Federal da Paraíba - UFPB
- Universidade Federal de Santa Catarina - UFSC
- Universidade Federal do Ceará - UFC
- Universidade Federal do Rio de Janeiro - UFRJ
- Universidade Federal do Rio Grande do Sul - UFRGS
- Universidade Presbiteriana Mackenzie
- Linear Equipamentos Eletrônicos S/A
- Superior Tecnologia em Radiodifusão Ltda
- Tecsys do Brasil Industrial Ltda
- EITV Entretenimento e Interatividade para TV Digital com Serv de Produtos de Informática
- Le Serviços de Informática e Comércio Ltda
- Quality Software S/A
- Totvs S/A
- Tqtvd Software Ltda
- Wimobilis Digital Technologies Informática Ltda
- Envision Indústria de Produtos Eletrônicos
- Rohde & Schwarz do Brasil Ltda
- Schadeck Consultoria em Tecnologia da Informação Ltda
- Screen Service do Brasil Ind e Com de Produtos Eletrônicos Ltda
