= PewPew (video game) =

2009 mobile video game

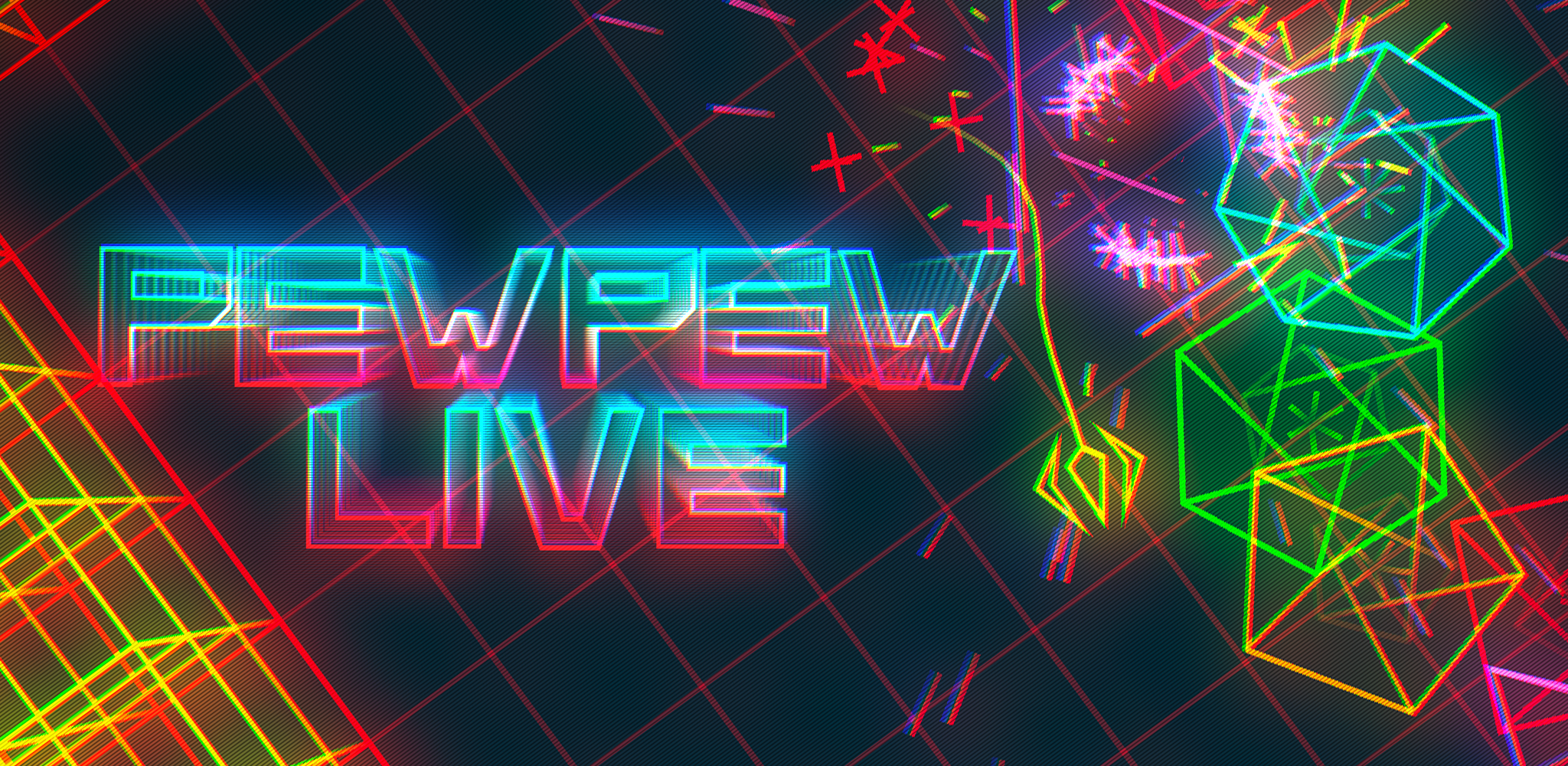
- PewPew Live Banner
- Developer: Jean-François Geyelin
- Engine: Custom engine made in C++
- Platforms: iOS, Android, Web
- Release: Jul 3, 2009
- Genre: Action / Shooter

PewPew is series of a 2009 iOS/Android game by a French developer Jean-François Geyelin. A sequel entitled PewPew 2 was released on May 6, 2010. It is a retro-themed multidirectional shooting game similar to Geometry Wars.

== Critical reception ==
=== PewPew ===
Pocket Gamer gave it an 8/10, writing "If you own an Android handset then this is a near-essential download; let's just hope that Bizarre Creations' lawyers don't strike from beyond the grave to block its distribution." Knowyourmobile gave it 5/5 stars, commenting "Not only is it a fitting tribute to one of the best twin-stick blasters ever coded, but it's also one of the most addictive Android action titles we've had the pleasure of experiencing this year." DroidLife said, "It takes the winning formula of the Geometry Wars series and mercilessly rips it off; I don't think there's any doubt about that. However, it replicated the dual joystick experience of an Xbox 360 controller quite well through two amazing responsive on-screen control knobs."

=== PewPew 2 ===
PewPew 2 has a rating on Metacritic of 90% based on 4 critic reviews.

SlideToPlay said "PewPew 2 is a perfect placeholder for Geometry Wars on the iPhone." AppSpy said, "Without a doubt, PewPew 2 goes above and beyond the first game making this an easy choice for fans, but if you're still hesitating on buying this excellent game then you can always try the first game for free!" 148Apps wrote, "Without trying to sound too positive about the game, I am thrilled that someone is finally trying to break the dual-stick genre out of its little box." TouchArcade stated, "The current version of PewPew 2 is one of the best dual-stick shooters available, and is well deserving of its modest price tag."

== PewPew Live ==
A sequel to PewPew 2, PewPew Live, was released on June 20, 2020. It is the first game in the series to feature local and online multiplayer, as well as community level support. The community levels are written in Lua. Many of the new features were strongly influenced by the game's community. Several new additions are community-made translations to German, French, Russian, Spanish, and Italian, improved ship customization, deterministic gameplay, various renderer modes, and an account system. This allows banning players that cheated level scores. The amount of quick-pauses per match, which was an advantage in PewPew and PewPew 2, were also limited.

== PewPew Live 2 ==
The update to PewPew Live that is accessed by paying for it, is currently being developed with new modes, music, ships and more. The only new mode we know of is "Partitioner", and is based on the gameplay of an Atari vector game Quantum.
