= Telecommunication Technology Committee =

Japanese government standardization organization

- Company type: Incentive K.K.
- Industry: standardization
- Founded: 1985; Japan
- Founder: Ministry of Internal Affairs and Communications
- Headquarters: Japan
- Owner: Ministry of Internal Affairs and Communications

The Telecommunication Technology Committee (TTC; Japanese: 情報通信技術委員会) is a standardization organization established in 1985 and authorized by Japan's Ministry of Internal Affairs and Communications to conduct research and to develop and promote standards for telecommunications in Japan.

The TTC is a founding partner organization of the Global Standards Collaboration initiative and an organizational partner of the 3rd Generation Partnership Project (3GPP).
