= Ceva (semiconductor company) =

American company

Ceva, Inc.
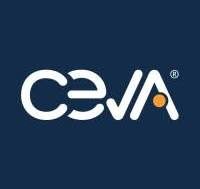
- Type: Public
- Traded as: Nasdaq: CEVA
- Industry: Semiconductor integrated circuits
- Founded: 2002; 24 years ago
- Founder: Brian Long, Peter McManamon
- Headquarters: Rockville, Maryland, United States
- Key people: Amir Panush (CEO)
- Products: Digital signal processor and deep learning processors
- Revenue: ▲US$109.6 million (2025)
- Operating income: ▼US$−11.3 million (2025)
- Net income: ▼US$−10.6 million (2025)
- Total assets: ▲US$378.8 million (2025)
- Total equity: ▲US$328.0 million (2025)
- Number of employees: 424 (2025)
- Website: www.ceva-ip.com

Ceva, Inc. is a publicly traded semiconductor and software intellectual property (IP) company listed on NASDAQ under the ticker symbol CEVA. Headquartered in Rockville, Maryland, Ceva develops and licenses signal processing platforms and AI processors for a broad range of smart edge applications. Its licensable technologies include wireless connectivity IPs of Bluetooth, Wi-Fi, UWB and 5G, scalable Edge AI NPU IPs and sensor fusion solutions, serving diverse markets such as automotive, consumer IoT, industrial, infrastructure, mobile, and PC.

== History ==
Ceva Inc. was created in November 2002 with the merger of the DSP IP licensing division of DSP Group (based in Israel) and Parthus Technologies plc. The agreement was announced in April, 2002.

The company used the name ParthusCeva for the combination and listed its shares on the Nasdaq under the symbol PCVA and the London Stock Exchange under the symbol PCV.

In December, 2003, the company dropped the "Parthus" from its name, and changed the ticker symbol to Ceva.

In 2007, it sold its stake in Dublin-based company GloNav to NXP Semiconductor for a gain of $10.9 million.

The company develops semiconductor intellectual property core technologies for multimedia and wireless communications. Ceva claimed the largest number of baseband processors in 2010, and a 90% DSP IP market share in 2011.

In July 2014 it acquired RivieraWaves SAS, a private company based in France.

In July 2019, the company acquired the Hillcrest Labs sensor fusion business from InterDigital. In the same month, CEVA entered into a strategic partnership with a Canadian company, Immervision to secure exclusive licensing rights for its patented image processing and sensor fusion technologies for wide-angle cameras.

On May 31, 2021, Ceva acquired Intrinsix, another semiconductor design company, for an estimated $33 million.

On September 20, 2023, Cadence acquired Intrinsix Corporation from Ceva.

== Technologies ==
=== Imaging and computer vision ===
Ceva develops technology for low-cost, low-power computational photography and computer vision. The company provides vision DSP cores, deep neural network toolkits, real-time software libraries, hardware accelerators, and algorithm developer ecosystems.

=== Deep learning ===
Ceva develops software for deep neural networks centered on the Ceva-XM computer vision and NeuPro AI cores.

NeuPro is Ceva's family of low-power artificial intelligence processors for deep learning. NeuPro processors are self-contained, specialized AI processors, scaling in performance for a broad range of end markets including IoT, smartphones, surveillance, automotive, robotics, medical, and industrial. This group of products offers high-performance configurations ranging from 2 Tera Ops Per Second (TOPS) for the entry-level processor and 12.5 TOPS for the most advanced configuration.

=== Wireless IoT ===
Wireless connectivity is often used in devices being created for the Internet of things (IoT). Ceva develops Wi-Fi, Bluetooth, ultra-wideband, and narrowband IoT integrated wireless IoT platforms for integration into a system on a chip (SoC).

== See also ==
- Qualcomm Hexagon
- Texas Instruments TMS320
