= InterDigital =

American technology company

InterDigital, Inc.
- Type: Public
- Traded as: Nasdaq: IDCC; S&P 400 component
- Industry: Wireless, Video, Patent monetization
- Founded: 1972; 54 years ago, in Philadelphia, Pennsylvania, U.S.
- Headquarters: Wilmington, Delaware, U.S.
- Key people: Doug Hutcheson (chairman); Liren Chen (president & CEO); Richard Brezski (CFO)
- Products: Research and development
- Revenue: ▲US$869 million (2024)
- Operating income: ▲US$440 million (2024)
- Net income: ▲US$359 million (2024)
- Total assets: ▲US$1.84 billion (2024)
- Total equity: ▲US$857 million (2024)
- Number of employees: 430 (2024)
- Website: interdigital.com

InterDigital, Inc. is an American technology research and development company that provides wireless and video technologies for mobile devices, networks, and services worldwide. Founded in 1972, InterDigital is listed on the Nasdaq and is included in the S&P 600 index.

InterDigital had 2020 revenue of $359 million and a portfolio of about 32,000 U.S. and foreign issued patents and patent applications.

== Corporate history ==
Key Dates:

- 1972: Company is incorporated as International Mobile Machines Corporation.
- 1981: Company goes public.
- 1992: IMM acquires SCS Mobilecom and SCS Telecom, and changes its name to InterDigital Communications Corp. SCS founder Donald L. Schilling becomes IDC executive. The company changes its stock ticker from IMM to IDC.
- 1998: Alliance with Nokia is established.
- 2003: Patent infringement suit is settled with Ericsson.
- 2012: Moved corporate headquarters from King of Prussia, Pennsylvania to Wilmington, Delaware.
- 2014: Samsung and InterDigital sign a patent license agreement.
- 2016: InterDigital signs license agreements with Apple and Huawei.
- 2016: InterDigital acquires sensor processing technology pioneer Hillcrest Labs.
- 2017: LG and InterDigital sign a patent license agreement.
- 2018: InterDigital acquires patent licensing business of Technicolor.
- 2019: Technicolor announces it has received a binding offer for its Research & Innovation Activity from InterDigital.
- 2021: Xiaomi and InterDigital sign a patent license agreement.

== Research areas ==
The company is primarily focused on advanced wireless (5G), video, and Internet of Things (IoT) research:

- Xhaul: InterDigital is part of a consortium of companies and academics working together to develop an adaptive, sharable, cost-efficient solution integrating the fronthaul and backhaul segments of the future 5G transport network.
- Horizon 2020 POINT: POINT (iP Over IcN– the betTer IP) aims to develop technology, innovations and business value chains for commercially viable IP-over-ICN deployment. The POINT project consists of nine partners (both academic and industrial) from five EU countries.
- RIFE: Project RIFE uses advanced networking technology to address the challenge of providing affordable internet access by increasing the efficiency of the underlying transport networks and the involved architectures and protocols. The project consortium includes 7 partners that include Martel Consulting, Aalto University, University of Cambridge, Thales, Avanti, guifi.net and InterDigital Europe.
- 5G Socioeconomic Study: InterDigital along with Tech4i2, Trinity College Dublin and Real Wireless has been commissioned to develop a socio-economic data study launched by the European Commission.
- oneM2M: In 2015, InterDigital Labs participated in joint testing to verify multi-vendor interoperability of the oneM2M standard with other participants that include Cisco, HERIT, Huawei, KETI, Ricoh and Qualcomm.
- FLAME: Flame is a 5G testbed for urban scale trials of open media Internet services in European cities, including Bristol, UK and Barcelona, Spain. The FLAME project is led by a consortium of twelve partners including University of Southampton, InterDigital Europe, Atos Spain, i2CAT, University of Bristol, Nextworks, Martel Innovate, VRT, The Walt Disney Company, ETH Zurich, Institut Municipal d'Informatica de Barcelona, and Bristol is Open.
- 5G-CORAL: 5G-CORAL is an H2020 European Union/Taiwan collaborative project that is exploring service-based design in a deep and volatile edge-fog virtualized infrastructure and contributing to standards development that impacts radio access network (RAN) terminal and infrastructure, by creating a unique opportunity for access convergence. 5G-CORAL is coordinated by Universidad Carlos III de Madrid (UC3M), and includes ADLINK, AZCOM, Ericsson, InterDigital, ITRI, RISE (Research Institutes of Sweden), Telcaria, Telecom Italia, and National Chiao Tung University (NCTU).

== Patent holdings ==
According to the company, since 2012 it has been listed by third-party analysts within the top 3 patent holders for cellular wireless more often than any other company, with percentages ranging from 8–10% of patents deemed likely to be standards-essential. According to research by Wiseharbor Research, a technology IP research firm, InterDigital Technology Corp. and InterDigital Patent Holdings held 282 declared essential LTE patents and 155 declared essential LTE patents respectively. The report also shows other mobile SEP owner-licensors such as Ericsson (146 declared essential LTE patents), Qualcomm (350 declared essential LTE patents), Nokia (142 declared essential LTE patents) and Huawei (182 declared essential LTE patents).

== Major licensees ==
In June 2014, Samsung and InterDigital entered into a patent license agreement that "resolves all pending litigation between the two companies". The agreement is cited as being worth just under $500 million.

William J. Merritt, president and CEO of InterDigital said in a statement: "We are very happy to have resolved the licensing dispute with Samsung on mutually agreeable terms. This agreement with Samsung shows how our longstanding patent licensing framework and process can lead to effective, productive discussions and eventual resolution on fair and reasonable terms".

In September 2016, InterDigital signed a license agreement with Huawei, and the companies agreed to "a framework for discussions regarding joint research and development efforts."

In December 2016, Apple and InterDigital entered into a multi-year license agreement.

== Chief executive officer ==
Lawrence (Liren) Chen was appointed president and chief executive officer on April 5, 2021.

== Locations ==
InterDigital is headquartered in Wilmington, Delaware, and has 13 offices (including 9 R&D facilities) in 8 countries around the world.
