= Nested Context Language =

Declarative authoring language for hypermedia documents

In the field of digital and interactive television, Nested Context Language (NCL) is a declarative authoring language for hypermedia documents. NCL documents do not contain multimedia elements such as audio or video content; rather they function as a "glue" language that specifies how multimedia components are related. In particular, NCL documents specify how these components are synchronized relative to each other and how the components are composed together into a unified document. Among its main facilities, it treats hypermedia relations as first-class entities through the definition of hypermedia connectors, and it can specify arbitrary semantics for a hypermedia composition using the concept of composite templates.

NCL is an XML application language that is an extension of XHTML, with XML elements and attributes specified by a modular approach. NCL modules can be added to standard web languages, such as XLink and SMIL.

NCL was initially designed for the Web environment, but a major application of NCL is use as the declarative language of the Japanese-Brazilian ISDB-Tb (International Standard for Digital Broadcasting) terrestrial DTV digital television middleware (named Ginga). It is also the first standardized technology of the ITU-T multimedia application framework series of specifications for IPTV (internet protocol television) services. In both cases it is used to develop interactive applications to digital television.

== Structure of an NCL document ==
NCL was designed to be modular to allow for use of subsets of modules according to the needs of the particular application. The 3.1 version of the standard is split into 14 areas with each module assigned to an area. Each module in turn defines one or more XML elements. The areas and associated modules are

- Structure
  - Structure Module
- Components
  - Media Module
  - Context Module
- Interfaces
  - MediaContentAnchor Module
  - CompositeNodeInterface Module
  - PropertyAnchor Module
  - SwitchInterface Module
- Layout
  - Layout Module
- Presentation Specification
  - Descriptor Module
- Timing
  - Timing Module
- Transition Effects
  - TransitionBase Module
  - Transition Module
- Navigational Key
  - KeyNavigation Module
- Presentation Control
  - TestRule Module
  - TestRuleUse Module
  - ContentControl Module
  - DescriptorControl Module
- Linking
  - Linking Module
- Connectors
  - ConnectorCommonPart Module
  - ConnectorAssessmentExpression Module
  - ConnectorCausalExpression Module
  - CausalConnector Module
  - CausalConnectorFunctionality Module
  - ConnectorBase Module
- Animation
  - Animation Module
- Reuse
  - Import Module
  - EntityReuse Module
  - ExtendedEntityReuse Module
- Meta-Information
  - Metainformation Module

== NCL profiles ==
Profiles are standard subsets of modules. Profiles defined by the standard include

- Full profile – includes all NCL Modules
- Enhanced Digital TV profile (EDTV) – includes the Structure, Layout, Media, Context, MediaContentAnchor, CompositeNodeInterface, PropertyAnchor, SwitchInterface, Descriptor, Linking, CausalConnectorFunctionality, ConnectorBase, TestRule, TestRuleUse, ContentControl, DescriptorControl, Timing, Import, EntityReuse, ExtendedEntityReuse, KeyNavigation, Animation, TransitionBase, Transition and Metainformation modules
- NCL Basic Digital TV profile (BDTV) – includes the Enhanced Digital TV profiles except for the Animation, TransitionBase and Transition modules

== Authoring tools ==
Tools for creating interactive DTV application in NCL include:

- NCL Eclipse
- NCL Composer.

== See also ==
- SMIL
- eXtensible Markup Language (XML)
