= Ravenfield (video game) =

Independent early access battlefield game

- Designer: Johan "SteelRaven7" Hassel
- Engine: Unity 2020.3
- Platforms: Microsoft Windows, macOS, Linux
- Release: WW: 18 May 2017 (early access); itch.io: 3 July 2016 (beta)
- Genre: First-person shooter
- Mode: Single-player

Ravenfield is a single player, low poly first-person shooter game developed by Swedish programmer Johan Hassel, who goes by the pseudonym SteelRaven7. It was released on 18 May 2017 as an early access title for Windows, macOS, and Linux.

== Gameplay ==
The game incorporates ragdoll physics with many options to give users the ability to control the AI, including a 'battle plan', which allows players to select different capture points for their AI teammates to focus defending or attacking. Other options include game factors such as AI count, with no hard limit, although higher numbers of AI quickly hurt the game's performance. There is also customizable loadouts for both teams where you can choose which vehicles and weapons are usable for the player and AI. Ravenfield consists of multiple team game modes that revolve around capturing flags on a given map, and gaining points by killing members of the enemy team. The game is inspired by other multiplayer first-person shooter games such as Battlefield and Call of Duty. Modding is supported via the Steam Workshop, with community members designing their own maps, weapons, vehicles and accompanying lore.

A second mode, titled Conquest, combined the pre-existing elements of large-scale combat with turn-based strategy, similar to the Galactic Conquest mode seen in Star Wars: Battlefront II. Game levels were represented by tiles on the map, and each tile can hold up to three battalions. The objective of conquest mode was to capture the opposing team's headquarters. Conquest mode was recently removed in an update that added a roguelike mode called arcade mode, though the developers have stated that it is planned to be updated and re-implemented at a later date.

The campaign mode has since been released. Multiple updates have been made since Beta 5, introducing a wide variety of features and bugfixes.

== Plot ==
While Ravenfield has no plot per se, during the 2019 Halloween Event, SteelRaven7 hinted at the possibility of an underlying plot in the game. It is speculated that more will be revealed in future updates to the Conquest game mode.

In July 2020, an update was released overhauling the Spec Ops game mode. It also introduced the first named characters, TALON team. TALON team is a 4 man special forces unit in the Eagle Faction's army. Later in December of that year 2 new characters were added: The Advisor, a second in command to the player character, and EYES, a reconnaissance specialist who assists TALON with avoiding enemy patrols and locates objectives. There is also a character named "???", which acts as an Advisor-type character for the Raven team players in the Spec Ops mode. In newer versions (Update EA27 and later) there is a test mission created by SteelRaven7 revealing 2 new characters, TALON-1 (the player character) and Rick, although it's not finished yet.

In July 2023, another update was released, adding a Story Mission map to the game. However, other official story missions have been cancelled in late 2024 in favor of less time consuming additions, though the developers have promised to finish the currently implemented mission.

== Development ==
Ravenfield started out as an experiment with ragdolls and AI. The beta version was released on itch.io on 3 July 2016. The game was posted on Steam Greenlight on 1 February 2017, and was officially released as an early access title on 18 May.

The current Ravenfield version is Early Access 39.

SteelRaven has been open on the official Ravenfield Discord Server, with updates on his work and features to see. SteelRaven recently introduced a WIP story mission which incorporates the usage of Navmesh and level succession for the first time.

== Reception ==
Christopher Livingston of PC Gamer called the game "glitchy” and "fun".

The game boasts an "Overwhelmingly Positive" recent and all-time score on Steam, and a 4.74/5 on itch.io.

Nathan Grayson of Kotaku criticized Ravenfield as "glitchy" and "barely functional in some places", but noted its ability to support a high number of computer-controlled players and expressed fascination with its good reception by players on Steam. The game supports Steam Workshop, and creators from the community have added new weapons, vehicles, maps, and features that add to and expand the game's vanilla feel, which was well received by players.
