= Association of Radio Industries and Businesses =

Standardisation organisation in Japan

- Trade name: ARIB (1983-present); Association of Radio Industries and Businesses (1983-present)
- Company type: Standards organization
- Founded: 1983
- Headquarters: Japan

The Association of Radio Industries and Businesses (Japanese: 電波産業会, Hepburn: Denpa sangyō-kai), commonly known as ARIB (アライブ, araibu), is a standardization organization in Japan. ARIB is designated as the center for promotion of the efficient use of the radio spectrum and the designated frequency change support agency. Its activities include those previously performed by the Research and Development Center for Radio Systems (RCR) and the Broadcasting Technology Association (BTA).

ARIB is a participating standards organization of the Global Standards Collaboration initiative and an organizational partner of the 3rd Generation Partnership Project (3GPP).

== See also ==
- ISDB
