= ISDB-T International =

Technical standard for digital televisions

ISDB-T International, also known in Brazil as Sistema Brasileiro de Televisão Digital (SBTVD; English: Brazilian Digital Television System), is a technical standard for digital television broadcast used in Brazil, Argentina, Peru, Botswana, Chile, Honduras, Venezuela, Ecuador, Costa Rica, Paraguay, Philippines, Bolivia, Nicaragua, El Salvador and Uruguay, based on the Japanese ISDB-T standard. ISDB-T International launched into commercial operation on 2 December 2007, in São Paulo, Brazil.

It is similar to ISDB-T, except it utilizes the H.264 video codec rather than MPEG-2, and replaces BML with Ginga, a middleware supporting Nested Context Language (NCL) and Java-based interactive TV applications.

The ISDB-T International standard was developed as SBTVD by a study group coordinated by the Brazilian Ministry of Communications and was led by the Brazilian Telecommunications Agency (ANATEL) with support from the Telecommunication's Research and Development Centre (CPqD). The study group was composed of members of ten other Brazilian ministries, the National Institute for Information Technology (ITI), several Brazilian universities, broadcast professional organizations, and manufacturers of broadcast/reception devices. The objective of the group was to develop and implement a digital terrestrial television standard in Brazil, addressing not only technical and economical issues, but also and mainly mitigating the digital divide, that is, to promote inclusion of those living apart from today's information society. Another goal was to enable access to e-government, i.e. to make government closer to the population, since in Brazil 95.1% of households have at least one TV set.

In January 2009, the Brazilian-Japanese study group for digital TV finished and published a specification document joining the Japanese ISDB-T with Brazilian SBTVD, resulting in a specification now called "ISDB-T International". ISDB-T International is the system that is proposed by Japan and Brazil for use in other countries in South America and around the world.

== History ==
The history of SBTVD development can be divided in two major periods: a) Initial Studies and Tests; b) Implementation of Digital TV Work Group and final definition of SBTVD standard.

=== Initial studies ===
Since 1994 a group composed of technicians from Brazilian Society for Television Engineering (SET) and Brazilian Association of Radio and Television Broadcasters (ABERT) has been analyzing existing digital TV standards (American ATSC, European DVB-T and Japanese ISDB-T) and its technical aspects but the discussion become a robust study only in 1998.

From 1998 to 2000, the ABERT and SET group, supported by Universidade Presbiteriana Mackenzie developed a study using several tests considering not only technical characteristics of each standard but also signal quality, both indoor and outdoor. That study compared all three major DTV standards in the world.

The results of the "Brazilian digital television tests" showed the insufficient quality for indoor reception presented by ATSC (that is a very important parameter because 47% of television sets in Brazil use only an internal antenna) and, between DVB-T and ISDB-T, the last one presented superior performance in indoor reception and flexibility to access digital services and TV programs through non-mobile, mobile or portable receivers with impressive quality.

In parallel in 1999, the Brazilian Ministry of Communication ordered the National Telecommunication Agency to carry on studies to select and implement a DTV standard in Brazil. Due to the completeness and quality of the ABERT/SET/Mackenzie study, ANATEL considered that as the official result and supported it considering ISDB-T the better standard to be implemented in Brazil.

However the final decision about the standard selected wasn't announced at that moment (August 2000) because of three main points:

- Some groups of society wanted to be more involved in that decision;
- The ATSC Committee and DVB Group wanted to review the ABERT/SET/Mackenzie report and ANATEL decision;
- Political discussions brought new requirements for the standard to be implemented in Brazil, such as digital inclusion and e-gov dissemination.

In the light of those points, the Brazilian Government, created a more structured discussion group, to review the first studies and to address these new points.

=== Implementation of Digital TV Work Group and final definition of SBTVD standard ===
The SBTVD program was deployed on November 26, 2003, by Presidential Act # 4.901, focusing the creation of a reference model for national terrestrial digital TV in Brazil.

The National Telecommunications Agency (ANATEL) was charged by the Brazilian Ministry of Communications to lead this work with the technical support of CPqD, and the contributions of 10 other Brazilian ministries, the National Institute for Information Technology (ITI), 25 organizations related to the matter (broadcast professionals, broadcast companies, TV program producers, etc.), and 75 universities/R&D institutes and electro-electronic manufacturers. More than 1,200 researchers/professionals were mobilized.

The DTV Work Group was organized in a structure with 3 areas of development:

- Development Committee (CD – Comitê de Desenvolvimento): to define, develop and implement a political and regulatory basis;
- Consultant Committee (CC – Comitê Consultivo): to define and develop the technical aspects of digital TV, and to select the best technology to be used in Brazil (including eventually a technology totally created in Brazil);
- Management Group (GG – Grupo Gestor): to manage specialized research groups.

The objective of the DTV Work Group was not only to define the technical and economical aspects of the Digital TV system but also to address:

- "Digital inclusion" for those living apart from today's "information society";
- The implementation of "e-gov", i.e. to make government closer to the population, because more than 94% of Brazilian families have at least one TV set;
- The provision of educational support via Digital TV through specialized content and interactive programs;
- The provision of cultural dissemination;
- The provision of social integration.

Besides, technical requirements are important and were also considered:

- 3D
- High definition;
- Interactive TV;
- Mobile and portable TV with quality;
- Signal robustness indoor and outdoor;
- Excellent data payload in the band.

Just for the Consultant Committee, 20 public RFP (Request for Proposal) were published trying to cover all areas that compose digital TV: Modulation, Signal Processing/Compression, video systems, audio systems, data transport, middleware, etc. The RFPs strongly reinforced the creation of research networks where the studies could be carried in a decentralized manner by several institutes working together.

Some groups worked to present a totally new digital standard, some groups worked to analyze and select the most known digital TV standards (American ATSC, European DVB-T and Japanese ISDB-T), and other groups worked to implement new features/modules to these already known standards.

After 3 years of studies and developments, the SBTVD Forum announced the selection of Japanese ISDB-T system as a baseline for the SBTVD system, enhanced by some new technologies:

- MPEG-4 AVC compression system (H.264) for video — allows more data payload in the same band. Japan uses MPEG-2 video;
- Middleware called "Ginga" more robust with declarative and procedural modules, to allow complex interactive applications. Japan uses BML middleware which is only declarative;

SBTVD system also presents some adaptations (the following are the main ones):

- The emission masks of transmitters were specially adapted in order to comply with more adverse scenarios for interference from other stations — this is important for implementation purposes in many countries where the spectrum is congested;
- Multiplexing and data structures and signaling were adapted to western standards, with the inclusion of character sets for Latin derived languages;
- Presentation rate of 30 frame/s even for portable receivers – more quality for portable TV;
- Implementation of Open Reception instead of B-CAS DRM Copy protection present in Japanese standard.

Note: There are around 16 technical documents for the SBTVD system, with more than 3,000 pages published by the ABNT (Brazilian Association for Technical Standards) and the SBTVD Forum detailing the entire SBTVD system.

The selection of the Japanese ISDB-T system as the baseline for SBTVD was based on video/audio quality indoor and outdoor, signal robustness, excellent interference treatment, support for complex interactive TV programs, and quality mobile TV. Besides that, ISDB-T with the new features like MPEG-4 video compression and Ginga middleware become an excellent support for those social requirements intended by the Brazilian Government (digital inclusion, educational and cultural support, e-gov, etc.).

Economical points were analyzed too, such as the elimination of royalties by the Japanese Government on the use of ISDB-T, the transfer of technology from Japan to Brazil, the creation of a Japanese-Brazilian work group for ongoing developments, and financial help for the initial implementation from the Japanese Development Bank.

The final decision was announced on June 29, 2006, by Presidential Act # 5.820 officially stating that Brazil adopted the ISDB-T terrestrial digital transmission system as the baseline for ISDB-Tb (the commercial name for the SBTVD system). The Presidential Act also defines the implementation plan and rules for digital TV in Brazil stating that in seven years all Brazilian territory must be covered by the digital TV signal and in 10 years (i.e. 2016) all TV broadcast must be digital, and that the band used by the broadcast companies for analog TV must be returned to the Brazilian Government. This Presidential Act states that ISDB-Tb must offer a "Multiprogram" feature. During the implementation in Brazil, however, the Ministry of Communication changed this requirement and blocked this feature at least until May 2009.

The decision for ISDB-T was contested by some sectors of society that complained it was a "political" decision where the Brazilian Government was influenced by the Broadcaster Association, especially TV Globo, since ISDB-T isolates TV business from telecommunication company business which will protect the already decreasing earnings of broadcasters in a world that is migrating from TV to Internet and cellular telephone services.

The SBTVD (ISDB-Tb) and the original ISDB-T are not compatible systems. That means a TV set or a set-top box bought in Japan will not work in Brazil and vice versa. However, the Japanese-Brazilian Working Group is working to join the two systems into only one to achieve the benefits of gains of scale.

On the other hand, Brazil is producing several types of TV sets and set-top boxes for the SBTVD (ISDB-Tb) system and in a good quantity and there is no problem meeting the consumer demand for TV sets, set-top boxes and also for transmitters and other components.

Peru, Argentina, Chile, Venezuela, Ecuador, Costa Rica, Paraguay, Uruguay, Philippines and Nicaragua have recently adopted ISDB-T and will reinforce the gains of scale in the production of equipment, thus continuing to reduce the price, consolidating the use of the ISDB-T International standard not only in South America.

== SBTVD Forum ==
Some months after Presidential Act number 5.820, in November 2006, the SBTVD Forum was created to lead and coordinate technical discussions about the standard, to create all related documentation (in conjunction with ABNT (Associação Brasileira de Normas Técnicas; Brazilian Association for Technical Standards)) and to plan further developments.

== First public tests ==
Samsung was the first company to do a public demonstration of SBTVD transmissions and receivers on June 19, 2007, although other companies claimed to have receivers ready at the time. At their showroom in São Paulo, two Full HD LCD sets were shown: one with a built-in tuner and another connected to a prototype set-top box. The tuner and set-top box were developed in Brazil, at Samsung's research center in Manaus, Amazonas. 1seg broadcasting to mobile devices was also shown.

The signal was a test reel from Rede Globo, broadcast at 1080i (the standard does not define 1080p) consisting of short clips from soap operas, talk shows, soccer games from recent years and footage of the Brazilian Carnival in Rio de Janeiro along with some scenic views. All content was natively HD, some of which was shot with high definition cameras experimentally placed in many of the studios where Globo produces its programs. They're experimentally broadcast in high definition by Globo. Broadcasts of the event could be seen both from Samsung's show room and electronics megastores that received digital tuners to show and demonstrate the technology to the public.

== Start of regular broadcasts and implementation status ==
DTT broadcasting systems. Countries using ISDB are shown in green.

Regular SBTVD broadcasts started on 2 December 2007, initially in São Paulo. Until 12 June 2010, the system had also launched in these other Brazilian cities: Rio de Janeiro, Belo Horizonte, Goiânia, Porto Alegre, Curitiba, Campinas, Cuiabá, Salvador, Florianópolis, Vitória, Uberlândia, São José do Rio Preto, Teresina, Santos, Brasília, Campo Grande, Fortaleza, Recife, João Pessoa, Sorocaba, Mogi das Cruzes, Ribeirão Preto, Manaus, Belém, Joinville, Aracaju, Londrina, São Luís, Araraquara and Natal, among others.

In the beginning, from the broadcasters' point of view, the DTV implementation in Brazil seemed to be very successful if compared with the implementation process in other countries. After 16 months, the digital TV signal covered almost 50% of the Brazilian population. The country successfully finished the transition from analog to digital TV in December 2018, when analog TV was phased out in most regions where it was still broadcasting. Citizens with low income who still had old TV sets (i.e. unable to receive digital TV) were given set top boxes to enable them to continue watching TV. However, there are some less populated regions where the regulator accepted phasing out to be postponed on 30 September 2023.

A new push in set-top box and DTV sets sales was expected with the final specification of Ginga middleware that will allow interactive use of TV.

Ginga 1.0 (a first implementation of Ginga) was already released for use by set-top box/DTV manufacturers, using NCL (Nested Context Language)/Lua as its declarative programming language. That part of Ginga is called Ginga-NCL. However, the complete Ginga middleware specification was planned to present the declarative NCL module and procedural Java module to allow programmers, manufacturers and users to take the best from the two environments: declarative and procedural.

The Java part of Ginga, called Ginga-J, had its specification approved by the SBTVD Forum in April 2009. The same forum declared that the APIs set developed by Sun Microsystems, called Java-DTV, is the standard for SBTVD system, after negotiations with Sun Microsystems to reduce royalties in 15%. Hence, the royalty cost defined by Sun for Java-DTV is much more affordable than that charged by GEM APIs owners (GEM middleware is used in DVB-T – the European DTV standard). That will benefit development of interactive set-top boxes and TV sets keeping them cheaper than if GEM was used as middleware or even if GEM APIs were used with Ginga-J.

In the 3rd quarter 2009 the first set-top boxes and TV sets with complete Ginga middleware (Ginga-NCL and Ginga-J) were available in the market. That date match with the release of first interactive programs to be broadcast by television companies.

At launch on 2 December 2007, set-top boxes were available for prices ranging between R$900 (~US$450) and R$1200 (~US$600), inhibiting sales. But after 8 months the prices dropped quickly to around R$300 (~US$150). The Federal Government announced subsidies worth 1 billion Reais (~US$556 million) so these prices faced a new reduction phase.

By May 2009 a 42 inch LCD TV full HD (1920×1080) with built-in digital TV tuner and special characteristics such as double presentation rate (120 Hz) and exceptional contrast (50.000:1) was being sold for R$3,600.00 (~US$1,800.00) in São Paulo City, a very impressive price reduction for such a quality product, and other basic devices present even lower prices. However, until September 2009 the smallest TV that could be bought with an integrated digital tuner was a 32 inch LCD TV. This was slowing down the adoption of digital TV in Brazil, since most people that watch FTA TV cannot afford buying expensive LCD TVs, and 21 and 29 inch CRT TVs were still very popular among the low income population and could be bought for about R$400–600 (US$200–300). From 2010 on, it was mandated that all TV sets sold in Brazil to be ISDB-T compatible. Furthermore, in the period between 2009 and 2013, Brazil's economy improved, which encouraged family consumption. This, associated with a rapid drop in prices of LCD and LED-backlit TVs quickly led to a more widespread usage of DTV. In December 2018, Brazil phased out analog transmissions in most of the country, leaving some regions to phase out analog transmissions on 30 September 2023. A massive distribution program of set top boxes to low income citizens who still had old TV sets (therefore unable to receive ISDB-T) was performed between 2015 and 2018. As of 2021, LED-backlit TV are much more affordable (like in most of the world), a 40" LED-backlit TV can be bought for about US$300.00.

Sales of mobile receivers (for laptops, mobile DTV sets and mobile phones with a built-in DTV receiver) were increasing very fast and it is assumed that mobility was perceived by consumers as a more attractive SBTVD/ISDB-T feature than HD or Full HD definition. The SBTVD/ISDB-T standard allows a very high mobile reception, with high quality and steady image, without noise, excellent audio and very robust reception even in the presence of signal reflection, electromagnetic or impulsive interference.

Peru, Argentina, Chile and Venezuela were planning the deployment before announcing their analog shutdown date.

== Multiprogram Feature ==
This innovative feature of the ISDB-T standard allows a consumer to watch three different programs at once, or in a sports match, it is possible to watch the game from the point of view of different cameras. The Brazilian Ministry of Communication prevented commercial broadcast companies from using this feature; only public DTV channels are allowed to use it. This decision was taken because Multiprogram could allow unauthorized use of the TV broadcast band. To start with, the Ministry of Communication informed that legal support was being created to the allow the use of such a feature, but later decided that the feature will be blocked until new studies are performed. TV Globo and ABRA (Association of Broadcasting Companies) are pushing the Ministry to keep the Multiprogram feature blocked because it will impact the current TV business model, reducing revenues from advertising. However, once users see the benefit of the Multiprogram feature, some organizations are asking that the Ministry of Communication will allow its use by all broadcasters. Some broadcasters, using a different business model from that used by TV Globo, are asking the Federal Superior Court to decide if the Multiprogram blockage is legal.

Only federal government TV channels are allowed to use Multiprogram in Brazil today. TV Cultura, a public television station from the state of São Paulo, obtained special authorization (for educational purposes only) and is currently using this feature to broadcast four different video programs. Besides the HDTV and the one-segment (handheld) streams, an additional archive program (Multicultura) and the Virtual University channel (UNIVESP) have been on air since August 2009.

In Japan Multiprogram has been successful with the launch of ISDB-T there.

== Return Channel ==
Brazilian broadcasters defend the use of the current analog TV VHF band for the "return channel", the channel that allows digital TV sets to send data to broadcasters as part of an interactive TV service. That 700 MHz band enables the return channel using WiMAX technology, which would be another option to be added to the regular ones (ADSL Internet, Cable Internet, GSM EDGE, GSM 3G, WiFi or dial).

That idea was to be presented to the Brazilian Government in the WiMAX Forum in June 2009, in the hope of creating an international standard for the return channel.

== Expansion of ISDB-T International/SBTVD/ISDB-Tb around the world ==
Digital Television in South America

The Brazilian and Japanese governments are working together to show the benefits of SBTVD (ISDB-Tb) standard to all South-American countries, focusing specially on the social benefits of digital inclusion through DTV and quality of image, sound and robustness of ISDB-T system as well as mobility and interaction.

=== Countries have adopted ISDB-T International/SBTVD (ISDB-Tb) ===
- Peru on 23 April 2009, the decision was taken based on recommendations by the Multi-sectional Commission to assess the most appropriate standard for the country, service started on 30 March 2010, and the deployment of the standard will start in October 2010. The National Government announced that the analog "blackout" will be gradual, starting in 2020, in the Lima Metropolitan Area, and finishing after 2030. They also announced that entry-level receivers (for standard definition only) will cost around US$20;
- Argentina on 28 August 2009, and service started on 28 April 2010.
- Chile on 14 September 2009, and experimental services started in June 2010. Regular services are scheduled to start on 10 March 2017.
- Venezuela on 6 October 2009. The seven stages of set-top box manufacturing, testing and implement schedule is well proceeding, and the government began trial broadcasting on 20 February 2013, in 13 cities.
- Ecuador on 26 March 2010, and started transmission by TC Television on 8 May 2013.
- Costa Rica on 25 May 2010, and start trial transmissions by Channel 13 from Irazú Volcano on 19 March 2012, and started official transmissions on 1 May 2014.
- Paraguay on 1 June 2010, and started experimental broadcasting from Asunción area on 15 August 2011.
- Philippines on 11 June 2010
- Bolivia on 5 July 2010, and start trial transmissions from June 2011 in La Paz, Cochabamba and Santa Cruz. President of Bolivia Evo Morales inaugurated official transmission on 14 May 2012.
- Nicaragua on 10 August 2010
- Uruguay on 27 December 2010, and also start trial transmissions from September 2011, and also state-owned channel starts trial transmission in August 2012.
- Maldives on 19 October 2011, attracted to Earthquake Early Warning for tsunami, and the first country with 8 MHz channel bandwidth.
- Botswana on 26 February 2013, first in African countries, and Botswana Television (BTV) officially started digital TV broadcasting on 29 July 2013.
- Guatemala on 30 May 2013.
- Honduras on 12 September 2013.
- Sri Lanka on 20 May 2014.
- Mongolia on 1 July 2014 and began experimental broadcasts is good on 28 May 2018. and followed by 31 December 2018 began experimental broadcasts as state-owned.
- El Salvador on 19 January 2017.
- Bangladesh on 7 November 2018, began trial transmission on 29 July 2019 followed by state-owned trial transmission began on 6 July 2020.
- Angola in 2013, decided on European digital terrestrial TV. However, Angola reviewed the adoption to ISDB-T International system in March 2019.

Brazil and Japan are presenting the benefits of SBTVD/ISDB-Tb standard to Guatemala, Cuba, Belize, Mozambique, Tanzania, Malawi, Thailand, and some SADC countries.

Additionally, Brazil and Japan engaged on efforts to promote the use of the system in South America to unite the region under a common digital transmission system.

=== Countries and territories using SBTVD/ISDB-T/ISDB-T International ===
Countries and territories using SBTVD/ISDB-T/ISDB-T International
Americas	Asia	Africa
Brazil	Japan	Botswana
Peru	Philippines	Angola
Argentina	Maldives	
Chile	Sri Lanka	
Ecuador	Mongolia	
Paraguay	Bangladesh	
Costa Rica
Bolivia
Nicaragua
Uruguay
Belize
Honduras
Guatemala
El Salvador
Venezuela
Peru

==== ITU-T certification for SBTVD/ISDB-T solutions ====
International Telecommunication Union (ITU) — a United Nations' regulatory agency for telecommunication and information technology questions — has certified on April 29, 2009, the module Ginga-NCL and the language NCL/Lua as the first international recommendation for interactive multimedia environments for Digital TV and IPTV—Recommendation H.761.

NCL/Lua and Ginga-NCL were developed by the TeleMidia Laboratory of the Informatics Department at Pontifícia Universidade Católica do Rio de Janeiro (PUC-Rio), a Brazilian university.

This is an important ITU-T standard as it addresses the standardization of middleware for interactivity in devices and set-top boxes for IPTV and Digital TV, before that market becomes full of incompatible hardware/software solutions, thus impacting final users.

Additionally, in October 2009, ITU has defined officially SBTVD as a subsystem for ISBD-T, developing 2 new recommendations:

- a. UIT-R BT.1699 regarding technical aspects of Ginga-NCL middleware for DTV and;
- b. UIT-R BT.1306 regarding innovations presented by Brazilian standard over ISDB-T like MPEG-4 compression, and others.

== Technical facts ==
Treeview of ISDB-T, channels, Segments and arranging multiple program broadcasting.

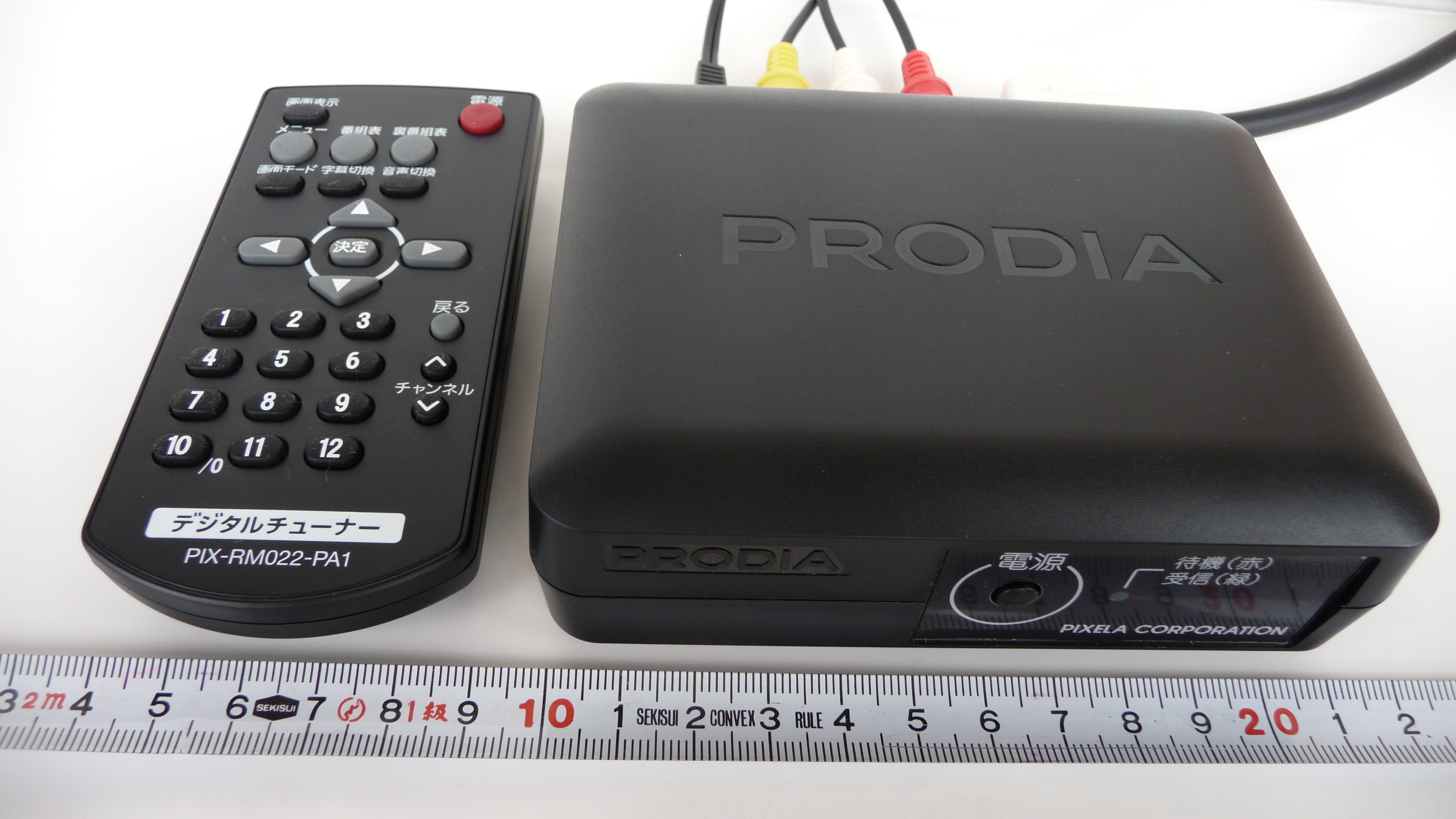
Low cost simple ISDB-T Set-top box (tuner) and remote control, connects to TV set through RCA connector. (very initial model in 2009)

a) Modulation: BST-OFDM (Band Segmented Transmission-Orthogonal Frequency Division Multiplexing).

b) Frequency Band: VHF or UHF, according to the country implementation strategy. UHF is a very affordable band once it is possible to implement digital services in current UHF "spaces" in broadcasting spectrum, while analog services are still running in the "jammed" VHF band. After the digital TV implementation rollout is finished and the analog signal is cut off, VHF can be used for other services or even to expand digital services to more broadcasters. Japan, the Philippines, and Brazil have chosen UHF. Peru, Argentina, Chile, and Venezuela are in the implementation design phase, so the band to be used was not defined.

The ISDB system can also work based on cable or satellite transmission (ISDB-C and ISDB-S) using an appropriate frequency band, but these standards are outside the scope of this article.

c) Transmission architecture: Segmented

- Non-Mobile receivers: 13 segments (for Full HD resolution).

Other arrangements are possible according to the desired resolution/number of programs transmitted.

- Mobile receivers (in vehicles, for example): The same as Non-Mobile
- Portable receivers (mobile phones, for example): 1 segment

d) Frame Rate:

- Non-Mobile/Mobile service: Argentina (also 25 frame/s and 50 frame/s), Japan, Peru, Brazil, Chile, Venezuela and Ecuador: 30 frame/s and 60 frame/s
- Portable service: Brazil, Peru, Argentina, Chile, Philippines and Ecuador: Maximum of 30 frame/s; Japan and Venezuela: Maximum of 15 frame/s

e) Channel Bandwidth: Japan, Brazil, Peru, Argentina, Chile, Venezuela and Ecuador: 6 MHz (It is possible to use SBTVD/ISDB-T system with 13 segments in 7 MHz or 8 MHz if that is required by any country. Maldives is the first country to adopt ISDB-T with 8 MHz channel bandwidth.)

f) Audio Compression System:

- Non-Mobile/Mobile service:
  - Multi Channel 5.1: MPEG-4 AAC@L4 (Advanced Audio Coding, Level 4) or MPEG-4 HE-AAC v1@L4 (High Efficiency AAC, Version 1, Level 4)
  - Stereo: MPEG-4 AAC@L2 (AAC Level 2) or MPEG-4 HE-AAC v1@L2 (HE-AAC, Version 1, Level 2)
- Portable service: MPEG-4 HE-AAC v2@L2 (HE-AAC, Version 2, Level 2) for stereo audio (or 2 mono channels) only.

All compression systems must be conform to ISO/IEC 14496-3:2004 standard. The Allowed transport mechanisms LATM/LOAS.

Note: Japan uses MPEG-2 AAC for non-mobile/mobile service and MPEG-4 HE-AAC for portable service. The Allowed transport mechanisms ADTS

g) Video Compression System:

- Non-Mobile/Mobile: MPEG-4 AVC HP@L4 (Advanced Video Coding, High Profile, Level 4)
- Portable: MPEG-4 AVC BP@L1.3 (AVC, Base Profile, Level 1.3)

Also, video codification must be conform to ISO/IEC 14496-10:2005 standard.

These standards are also known as ITU-T H.264:2005 Recommendation.

Note: Japan uses MPEG-2 video.

h) Video Resolution, Framing and Aspect Ratio:

- Non-Mobile/Mobile:
  - SD 720x480i at 4:3 or 16:9
  - SD 720x480p at 4:3 or 16:9
  - SD 720x576i at 4:3 or 16:9
  - SD 720x576p at 4:3 or 16:9
  - HD 1280x720p at 16:9
  - Full HD 1920x1080i at 16:9
    - Note: i = interlaced framing; p = progressive framing
- Portable:
  - SQVGA (160x120 or 160x90)
  - QVGA (320x240 or 320x180)
  - CIF (352x288)
    - All these formats using 4:3 or 16:9 aspect ratios.

i) Multiplexing system: MPEG-2 system (ISO/IEC 13818-1 2000). That standard is used by Japan, Brazil, Peru, Argentina, Chile, Venezuela and Ecuador.

j) Processes for Error Correction: Time Interleaving and Frequence Interleaving

k) Interactive TV middleware:

- ISDB-T: Declarative: BML; Procedural: Not implemented – Optional GEM
- SBTVD/ISDB-T International: Declarative: Ginga-NCL; Procedural: Ginga-J

l) Other characteristics:

- Multiprogram:

Allows 1 program Full HD (1920 x 1080 dots at 16:9 aspect ratio) in a channel; or 1 program HD and 1 program SD in a channel; or 3 programs SD in a channel.

=== Alert broadcast ===
Earthquake Early Warning (Japan) emergency box superimposed shown on the screen of NHK TV with alert sound and information.

Allows the government or authority configure the Emergency Warning Broadcast System and send an alert (earthquake, tsunami, etc.) to each device in the area ISDB-T/SBTVD/ISDB-T International signal is present. The alert signal uses some data space in one of the segments of the data stream and turns on all receivers, if turned off, and presents the alert information.

An example of such alert is Earthquake Early Warning (EEW), which is well-utilized with alert sound and emergency box superimposed on TV screen at time of the 2011 Tōhoku earthquake and tsunami and many aftershocks in several days.

In April 2011, the Chilean Subsecretary of Telecommunications will disclose to implement similar alert system utilized in Japan through ISDB-T. Philippines will implement emergency warning broadcast to households. The SBTVD Forum closed an agreement with the Brazilian Government for the adoption of the Japanese standard EEW or EWS in June 2011.

=== Summary table ===
Transmission channel coding	Modulation Scheme	64QAM-OFDM, 16QAM-OFDM, QPSK-OFDM, DQPSK-OFDM (Hierarchical transmission)
Transmission channel coding	Error correction coding	Inner coding: Convolution 7/8,3/4,2/3,1/2; Outer coding: RS(204,188)
Transmission channel coding	Guard interval	1/16, 1/8, 1/4
Transmission channel coding	Interleaving	Time, Frequency, bit, byte
Transmission channel coding	Modulation Type	BST-OFDM (segmented structure OFDM – 13 segments)
Conditional Access		Multi-2, Verimatrix (Philippines only)
Middleware		Ginga Middleware: Ginga-NCL (declarative environment) and Ginga-J (procedural environment)
Service information		ARIB STD B-10
Multiplexing		MPEG-2 Systems
Audio coding
Audio coding	Non-Mobile/Mobile	Stereo: MPEG-4 AAC@L2 or MPEG-4 HE-AAC v1@L2; Multi-Channel 5.1: MPEG-4 AAC@L4 or MPEG-4 HE-AAC v1@L4
Audio coding	Portable	Stereo only: MPEG-4 HE-AAC v2@L2
Video coding
Video coding	Non-Mobile/Mobile	MPEG-4 AVC (H.264) HP@L4
Video coding	Portable	MPEG-4 AVC (H.264) BP@L1.3

== Derived from ISDB-T International ==
- SATVD – Argentine System of Digital TV, or SATVD-T – Sistema Argentino de Televisión Digital Terrestre
- SBTVD – Sistema Brasileiro de Televisão Digital
