= Brazilian Technical Standards Association =

Brazilian standards development organization

- Associação Brasileira de Normas Técnicas
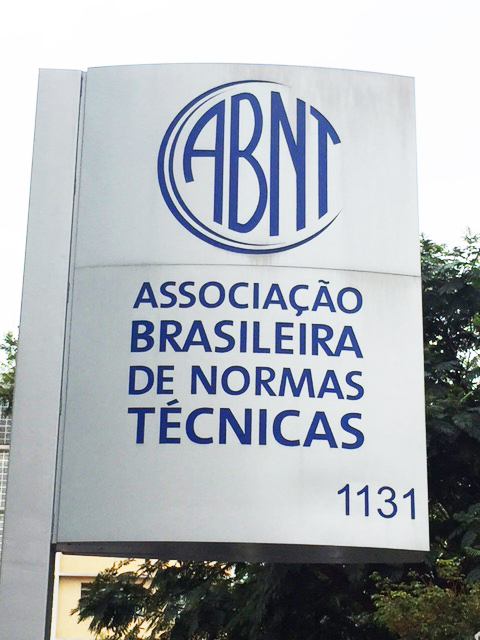
- Abbreviation: ABNT
- Formation: 28 September 1940; 86 years ago
- Purpose: National standards
- Headquarters: Rio de Janeiro and São Paulo
- Region served: Brazil
- Official language: Portuguese
- General director: Ricardo R. Fragoso
- Affiliations: ISO
- Website: www.abnt.org.br

The Brazilian Technical Standards Association (Portuguese: Associação Brasileira de Normas Técnicas, ABNT) is a private non-profit organization and the normative body which is responsible for technical standards in Brazil, and intends to promote technological development in the country. Brazilian national standards published by the association are named Norma Brasileira and abbreviated NBR.

ABNT was founded on 28 September 1940. It was officially adopted by the Brazilian government in 1962.

It is a founding member of the International Organization for Standardization (ISO), the Panamerican Standards Commission (COPANT), and the Mercosur Standards Association (AMN). ABNT is the exclusive representative of Brazil in the international organizations ISO and IEC and in the regional entities COPANT and AMN.
