= VOQ =

VOQ may refer to:

- Virtual output queueing
- Sierra Wireless Voq, a Smartphone
- Voice of Quellious, a fictional magical item in the video game EverQuest
- Visiting Officers Quarters (US military)
- Voq, a Klingon character later surgically altered into a Klingon-Human hybrid in Star Trek: Discovery.
