= Transport =

Movement of goods or people between locations

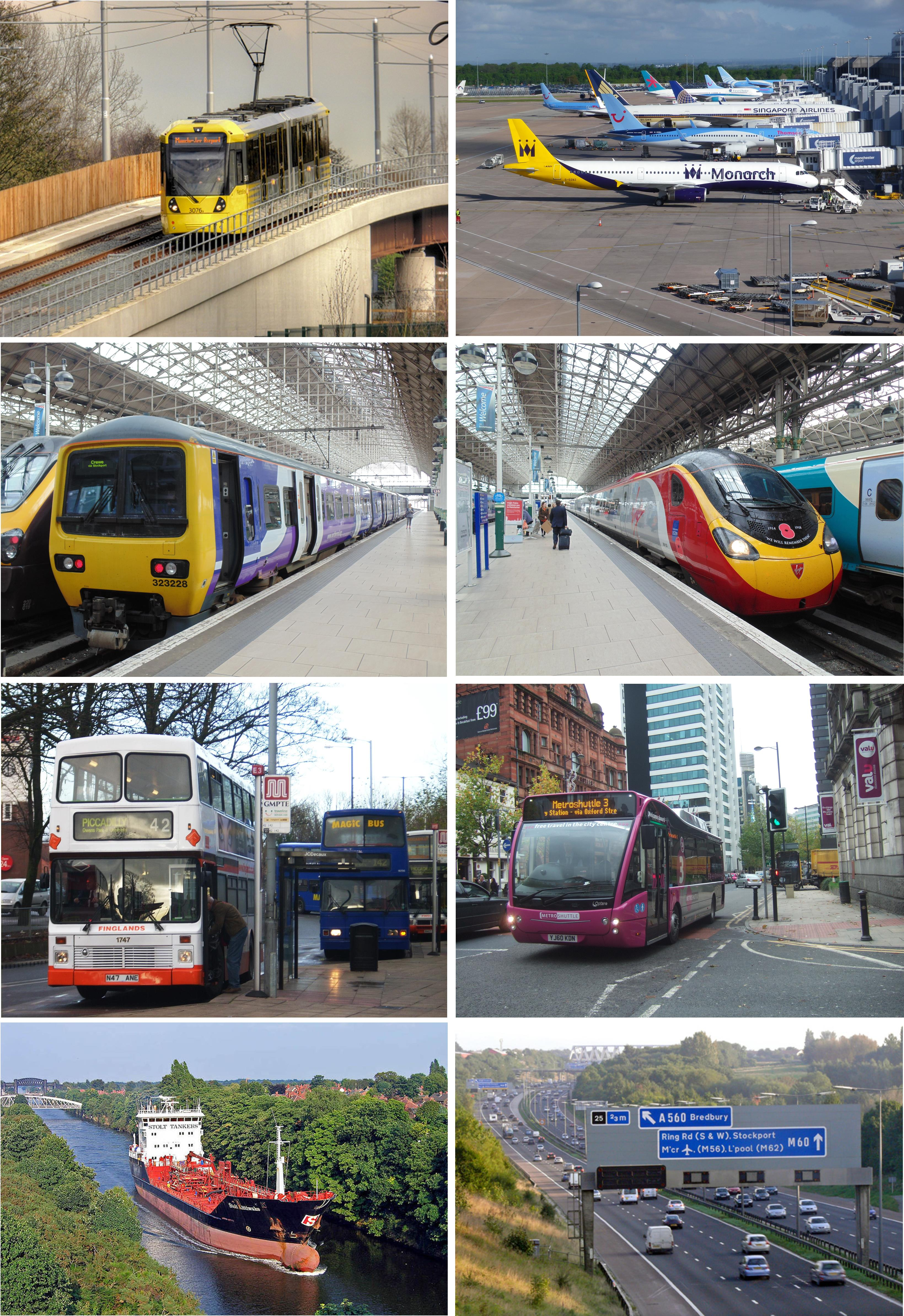
Various modes of transport in a human environment, shown in examples in and around Manchester, England

Transport (in British English) or transportation (in American English) is the intentional movement of humans, animals, and goods from one location to another. Modes of transport include air, land (rail and road), water, cable, pipelines, and space. The field can be divided into infrastructure, vehicles, and operations. Transport enables human trade, which is essential for the development of civilizations.

Transport infrastructure consists of fixed installations, including roads, railways, airways, waterways, canals, and pipelines, as well as terminals such as airports, railway stations, bus stations, warehouses, trucking terminals, refueling depots (including fuel docks and fuel stations), and seaports. Terminals may be used both for the interchange of passengers and cargo and for maintenance.

Means of transport are any of the different kinds of transport facilities used to carry people or cargo. They may include vehicles, riding animals, and pack animals. Vehicles may include wagons, automobiles, bicycles, buses, trains, trucks, helicopters, watercraft, spacecraft, and aircraft.

Mobility is concerned with the experience around transportation services, including aspects such as availability, information, usability, accessibility, and affordability (as in right to mobility).

== Modes ==
A mode of transport is a method or way of travelling, or of transporting people or cargo. The transport of a person or of cargo may involve one mode or several of the modes, with the latter case being called inter-modal or multi-modal transport. Each mode has its own advantages and disadvantages, and will be chosen on the basis of cost, capability, and route. The different modes of transport include air, water, and land transport, which includes rails or railways, road and off-road transport. Other modes of transport also exist, including pipelines, cable transport, and space transport and maglev transport. Human-powered transport and animal-powered transport are sometimes regarded as distinct modes, but they may lie in other categories such as land or water transport. In general, transportation refers to the moving of people, animals, and other goods from one place to another, and means of transport refers to the transport facilities used to carry people or cargo according to the chosen mode. Examples of the means of transport include automobiles, airplanes, ships, trucks, and trains. Each mode of transport has a fundamentally different set of technological solutions. Each mode has its own infrastructure, vehicles, transport operators, and operations.

Governments regulate the way the vehicles are operated, and the procedures set for this purpose, including financing, legalities, and policies. In the transport industry, operations and ownership of infrastructure can be public, private, or a partnership between the two, depending on the country and mode. Transport modes can be a mix of the two ownership systems, such as privately owned cars and government-owned urban transport in cities. Many international airlines have a mixed public-private ownership.

Passenger transport may be public, where operators provide scheduled services, or private. Freight transport has become focused on containerization, although bulk transport is used for large volumes of durable items. Transport plays an important part in economic growth and globalization, but machine-propelled forms cause air pollution and use large amounts of land. While it is heavily subsidized by governments, good planning of transport is essential to make traffic flow and restrain urban sprawl.

=== Human-powered ===
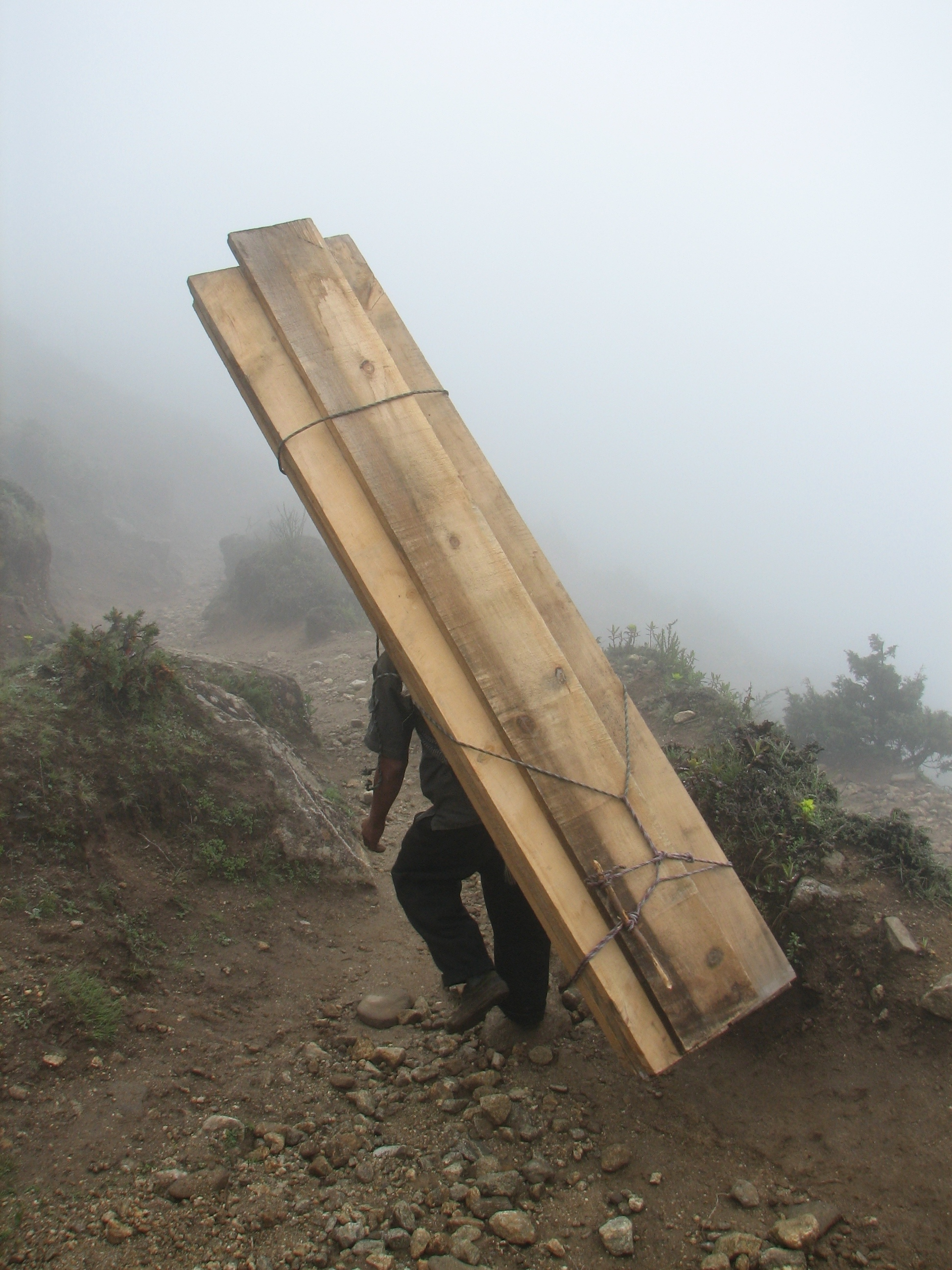
Human-powered transport remains common in developing countries.

Human-powered transport, a form of sustainable transport, is the transport of people or goods using human muscle-power, in the form of walking, running, and swimming. Technology has allowed machines to improve the energy efficiency of human mobility on relatively smooth terrain. Human-powered transport remains popular for reasons of cost-saving, leisure, physical exercise, and environmentalism; it is sometimes the only type available, especially in underdeveloped or inaccessible regions.

Although humans are able to walk without infrastructure, the accessibility can be enhanced through the use of roads, sidewalks, and shared-use paths, especially when using the human power with vehicles, such as bicycles, inline skates, and wheelchairs. Human-powered vehicles have been developed for difficult environments, such as snow and water, by watercraft rowing and skiing; even the air can be flown through with human-powered aircraft. Personal transporters, a form of hybrid human-electric powered vehicle, have emerged in the 21st century as a form of multi-model urban transport.

=== Animal-powered ===
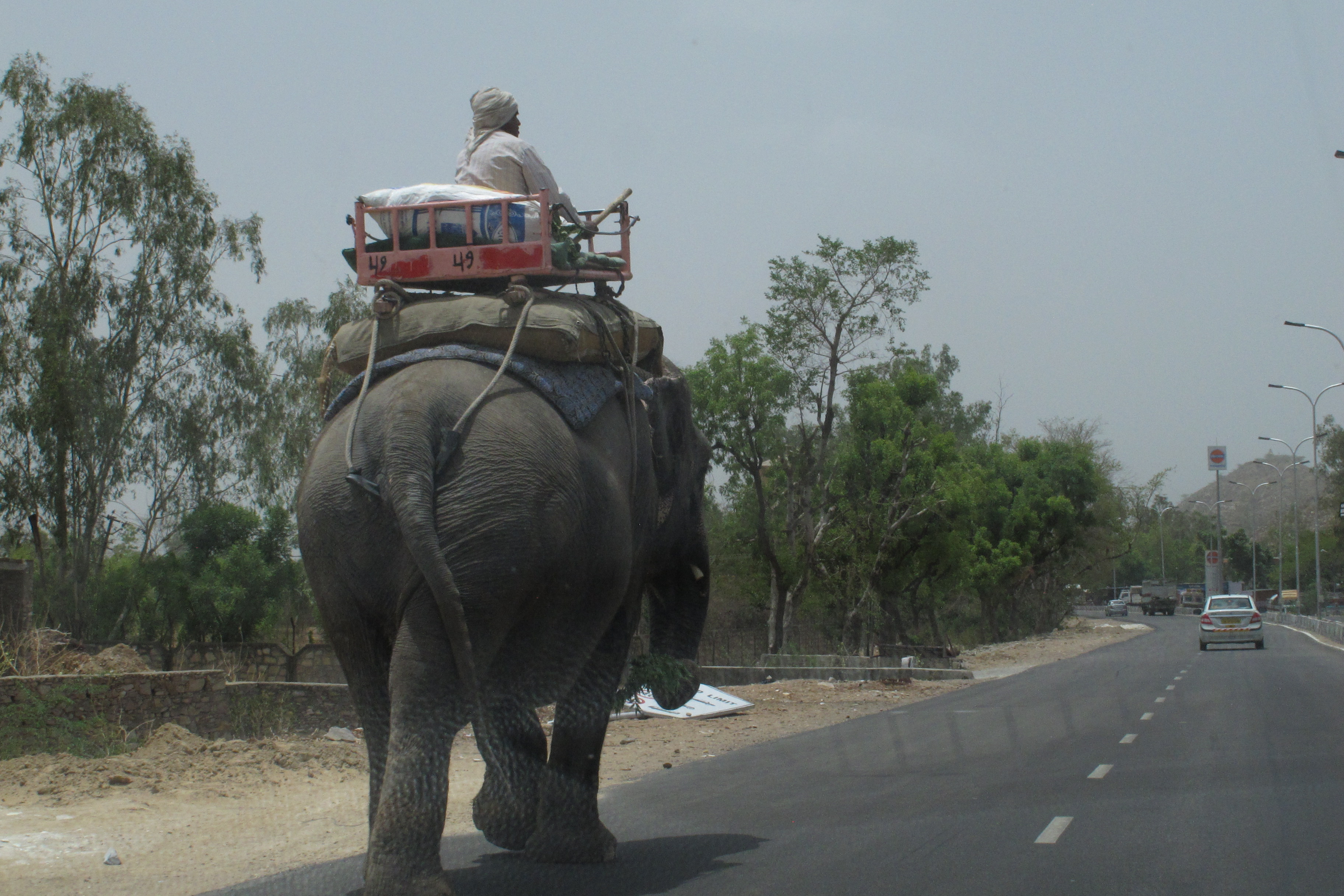
Elephant transporting a person and some cargo on a highway between Delhi and Jaipur, India

Animal-powered transport is the use of working animals for the movement of people and commodities. Humans may ride some of the animals directly, use them as pack animals for carrying goods, or harness them, alone or in teams, to pull sleds or wheeled vehicles. They remain useful in rough terrain that is not readily accessible by automotive-based transportation.

=== Air ===
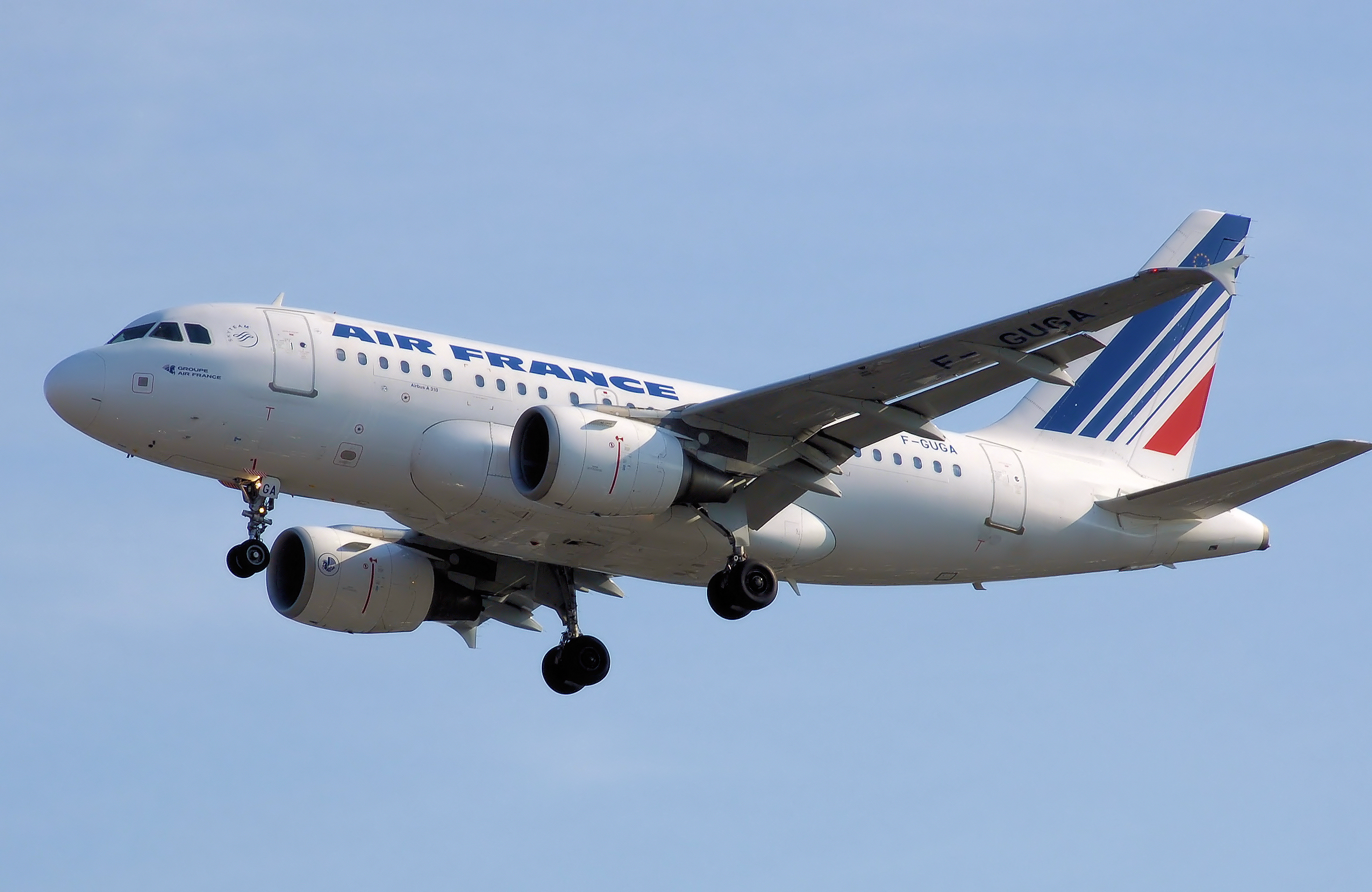
An Air France Airbus A318 landing at London Heathrow Airport

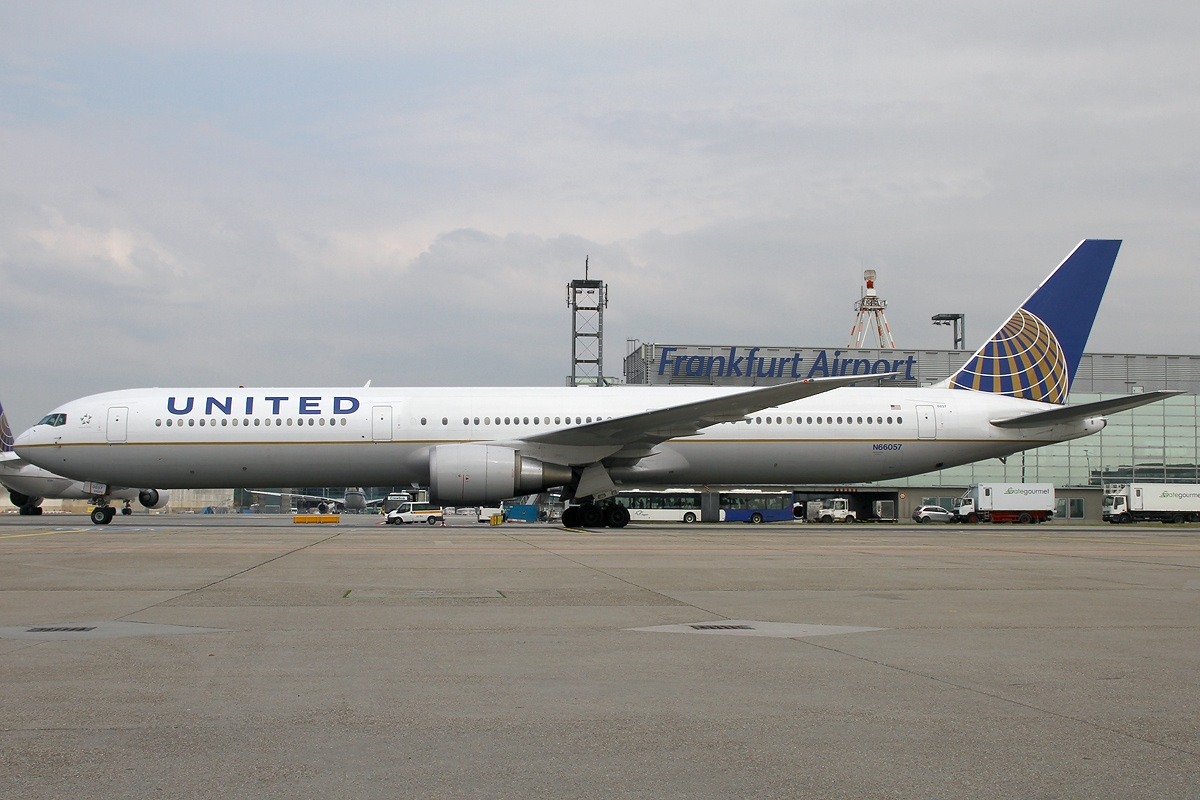
United Airlines Boeing 767-400 taxing at Frankfurt Airport in April 2011.

A fixed-wing aircraft, commonly called an airplane, is a heavier-than-air craft where movement of the air in relation to the wings is used to generate lift. The term is used to distinguish this from rotary-wing aircraft, where the movement of the lift surfaces relative to the air generates lift. For short distances or in places without runways, helicopters can be operable. A gyroplane is both fixed-wing and rotary wing. Fixed-wing aircraft range from small trainers and recreational aircraft to large airliners and military cargo aircraft.

Two things necessary for aircraft are air flow over the wings for lift and an apparatus for landing. The majority of aircraft require an airport with the infrastructure for maintenance, restocking, and refueling and for the loading and unloading of crew, cargo, and passengers. Many aerodromes have takeoff and landing restrictions on weight and runway length, and so are not able to handle all types of aircraft. While the vast majority of fixed-wing aircraft land and take off on land, some are capable of take-off and landing on ice, snow, and calm water.

Autonomous or remotely-piloted airplanes are known as unmanned aerial vehicles, or UAV. These drones can range in size from less than a metre across to a full-sized airplane. They are capable of carrying a payload, and are being used for package delivery.

The aircraft is the second fastest method of transport, after the rocket. Commercial jets reach speeds of up to 955 kilometres per hour (593 mph) and a considerably higher ground speed if there is a jet stream tailwind, while piston-powered general aviation aircraft may reach up to 555 kilometres per hour (345 mph) or more. This celerity comes with higher cost and energy use, and aviation's impacts to the environment and particularly the global climate require consideration when comparing modes of transportation. The Intergovernmental Panel on Climate Change (IPCC) estimates a commercial jet's flight to have some 2-4 times the effect on the climate than if the same CO_{2} emissions were made at ground level, because of different atmospheric chemistry and radiative forcing effects at the higher altitude. U.S. airlines alone burned about 14.2 billion gallons of fuel during the twelve months between January and November 2026. WHO estimates that globally as many as 500,000 people at a time are on planes. The global trend has been for increasing numbers of people to travel by air, and individually to do so with increasing frequency and over longer distances, a dilemma that has the attention of climate scientists and other researchers, along with the press. The issue of impacts from frequent travel, particularly by air because of the long distances that are easily covered in one or a few days, is called hypermobility and has been a topic of research and governmental concern for many years.

An aerostat is a class of lighter-than-air aircraft that gains its lift by containing a volume of gas that has a lower density than the surrounding atmosphere. These include balloons and rigid, semi-rigid, or non-rigid airships; the last is called a blimp. The lifting gas is typically helium, as hydrogen is highly flammable. Alternatively, heated air is used in hot air balloons and thermal airships. Aerostats can transport passengers and a payload over long distances. For example, zeppelins were used on long-ranged bombing raids during World War I.

=== Land ===
Land transport covers all land-based transport systems that provide for the movement of people, goods, and services. Land transport plays a vital role in linking communities to each other. Land transport is a key factor in urban planning. It consists of two kinds, rail and road.

==== Rail ====
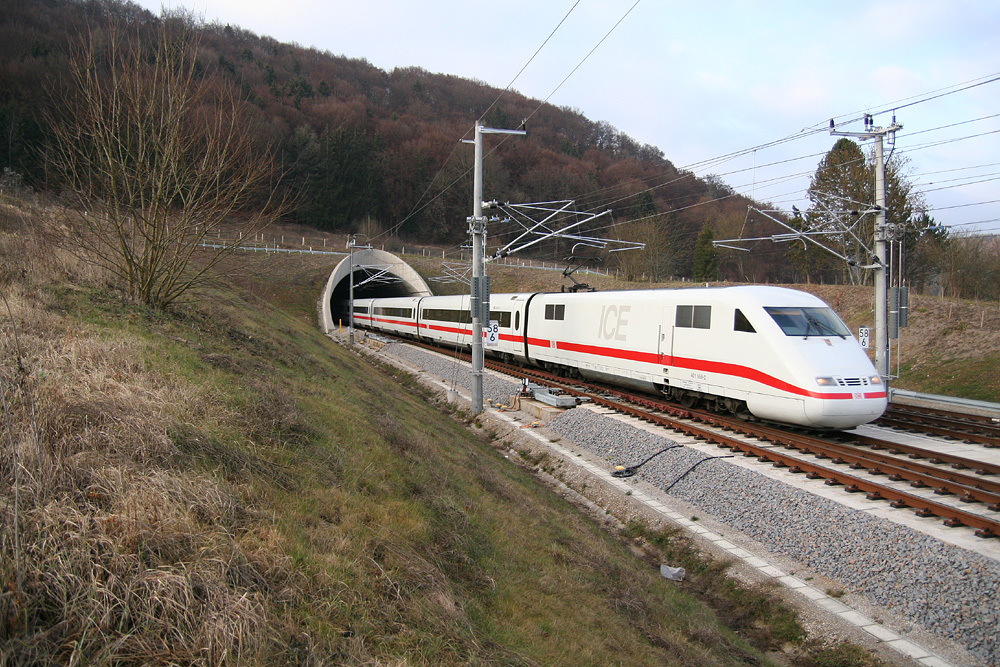
Intercity Express, a German high-speed passenger train

Rail transport consists of wheeled vehicles running on tracks, which usually consist of two parallel steel rails, known as a railway or railroad. The rails are anchored perpendicular to ties (or sleepers) of timber, concrete, or steel, to maintain a consistent distance apart, or gauge. The rails and perpendicular beams are placed on a foundation made of concrete or compressed earth and gravel in a bed of ballast. Alternative methods include monorail, maglev, and hyperloop. Dual gauge railways have three or four rails, allowing use by trains with two or three track gauges. For steep grades, a railway can use an additional toothed rack rail for traction.

A train consists of one or more connected vehicles that operate on the rails, known as rolling stock. Propulsion is commonly provided by a locomotive, which hauls a series of unpowered cars that carry passengers or freight. The locomotive can be powered by steam, diesel, gas turbine, or else electricity supplied by trackside systems. Some or all the cars can be powered, known as a multiple unit. A tram is similar to a train, but is generally smaller, travels shorter distances, and runs on rails that are integrated into the streets. Typically a tram is electric-powered, but they have also been propelled by horses, cables, gravity, or pneumatics. Railed vehicles move with much less friction than rubber tires on paved roads, making trains more energy efficient, though not as efficient as ships.

Intercity trains are long-haul services connecting cities; modern high-speed rail is capable of speeds up to 350 km/h (220 mph), but this requires specially built track. Commercial maglev transport in Shanghai runs at 460 km/h (290 mph). Regional and commuter trains feed cities from suburbs and surrounding areas, while intra-urban transport is performed by high-capacity tramways and rapid transits, in many cases making up the backbone of a city's public transport. Freight trains traditionally used box cars, requiring manual loading and unloading of the cargo. Since the 1980s, container trains have become the dominant solution for general freight, while large quantities of bulk are transported by dedicated rolling stock. An example of the latter are specially designed tank cars for the transport of hazardous materials.

==== Road ====
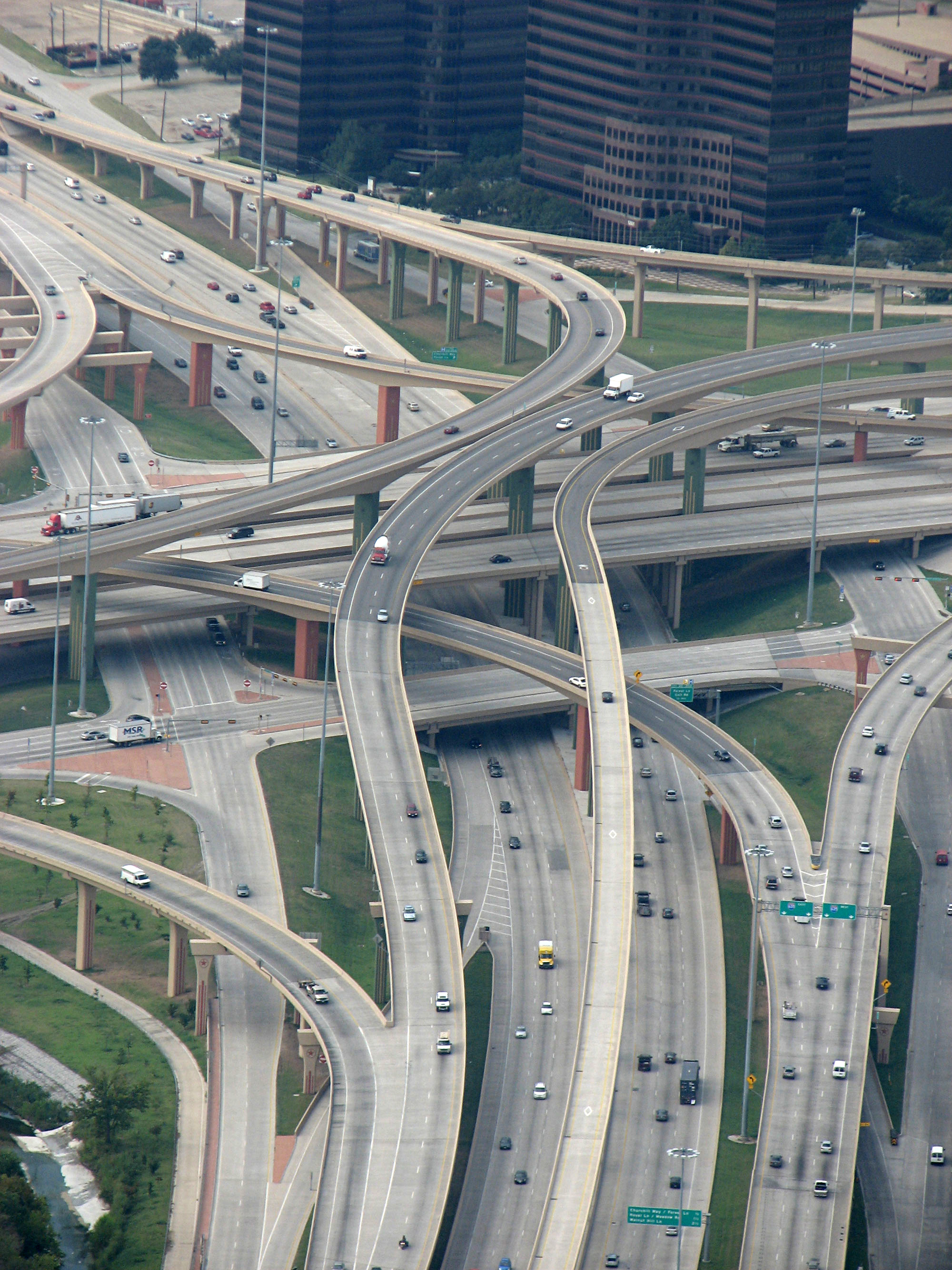
Road transport

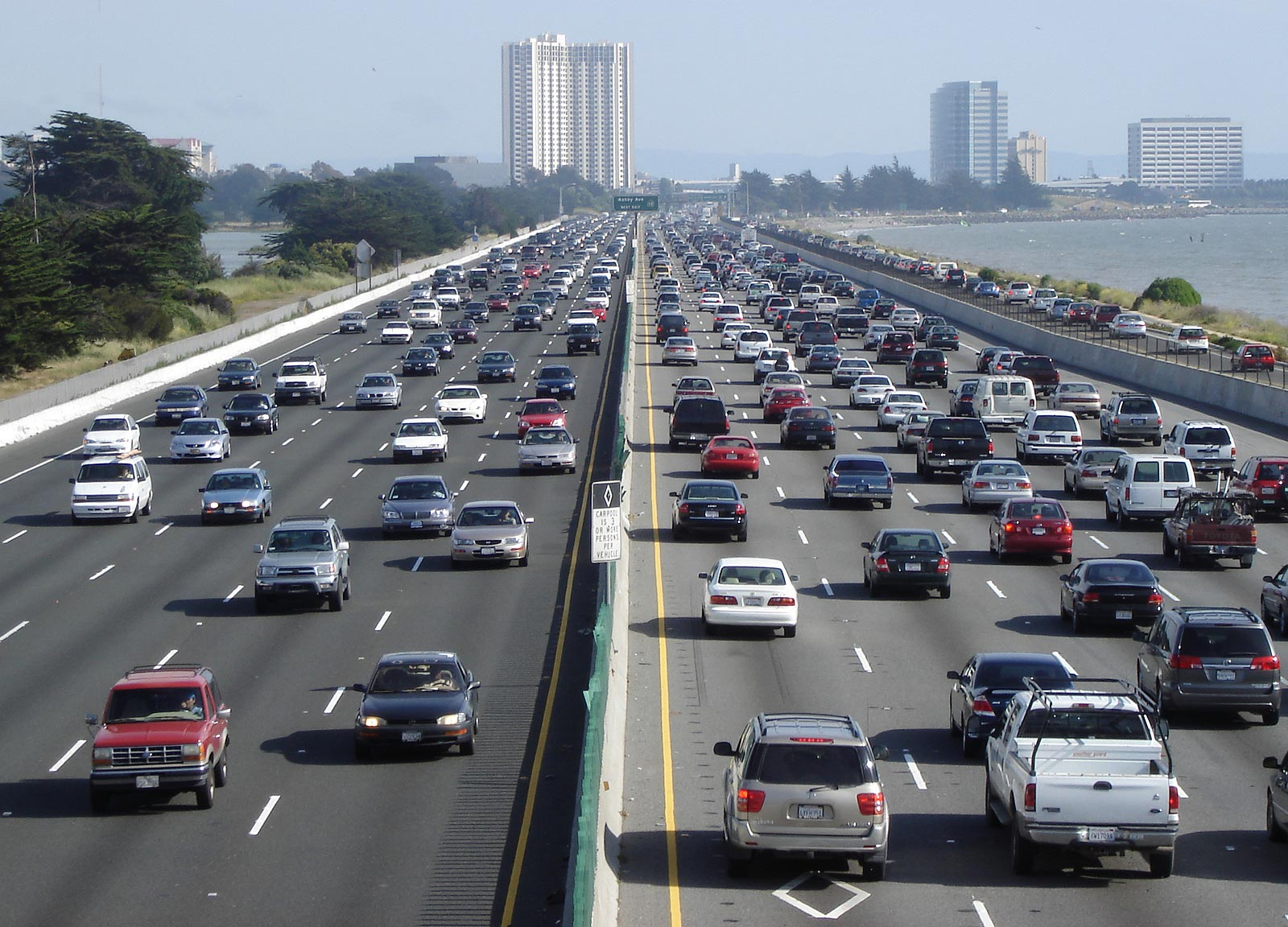
Traffic on the Eastshore Freeway (Interstate 80) near Berkeley, California, United States in October 2006.

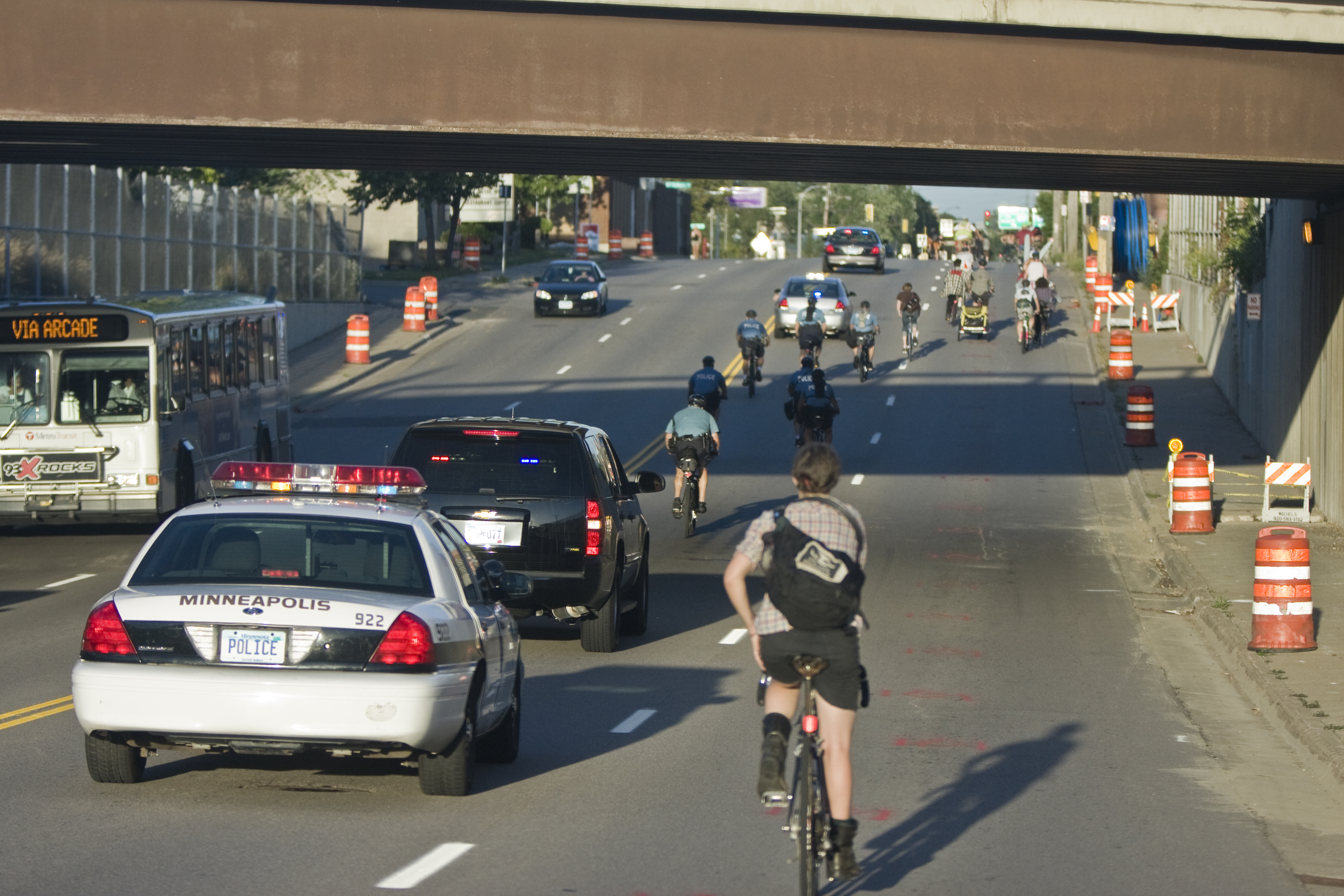
Bus, cars and bicycles in Minneapolis, Minnesota, United States in August 2008.

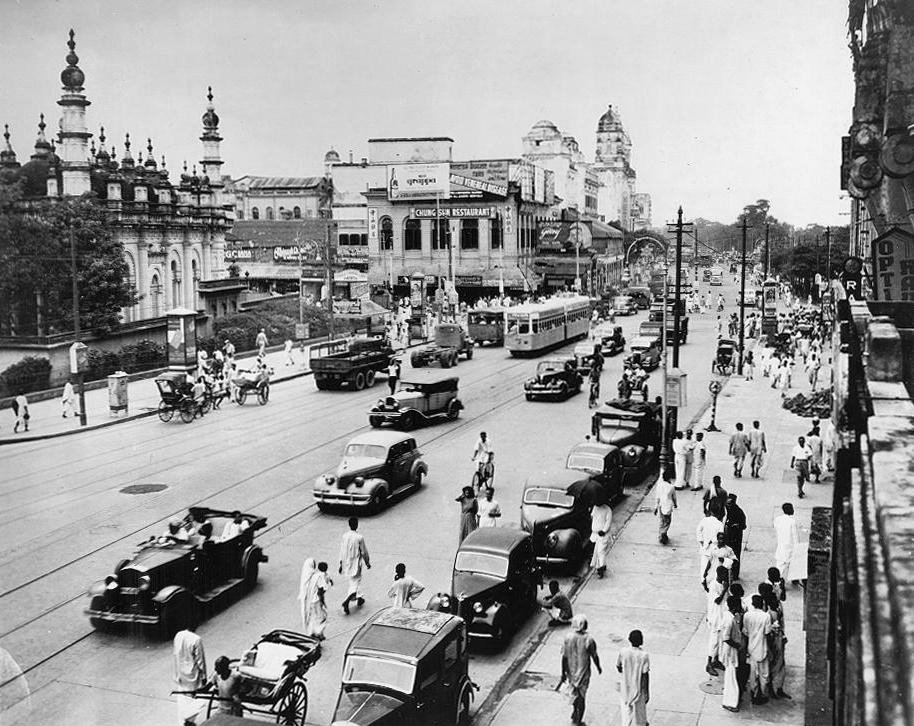
Trams, lorries, cars, bicycles and rickshaws, 1945

A road is an identifiable route, way, or path between two or more places. Roads are typically smoothed, paved, or otherwise prepared to allow easy travel; though they need not be, and historically many roads were simply recognizable routes without any formal construction or maintenance. In urban areas, roads may pass through a city or village and be named as streets, serving a dual function as urban space easement and route.

The most common road vehicle is the automobile, a light duty wheeled passenger vehicle that carries its own motor. Other users of roads include buses, trucks, motorcycles, bicycles, and pedestrians. As of 2026, there are 1.699 billion passenger cars worldwide, with a projected total of 2.5 billion in 2050. Road transport offers road users the flexibility to transfer the vehicle from one lane to the other and from one road to another according to the need and convenience. This combination of changes in location, direction, speed, and timings of travel is not available to other motorized modes of transport. It is possible to provide efficient intracity door-to-door service only by road transport.

Some drawbacks are that road systems consume large amounts of space, are costly to build and maintain (including vehicles), lead to urban congestion, and have only limited ability to achieve economies of scale. Automobiles provide high flexibility with low capacity, but require high energy and area use, and are the main source of harmful noise and air pollution in cities; buses allow for more efficient travel at the cost of reduced flexibility. Road transport by truck is often the initial and final stage of freight transport.

=== Water ===
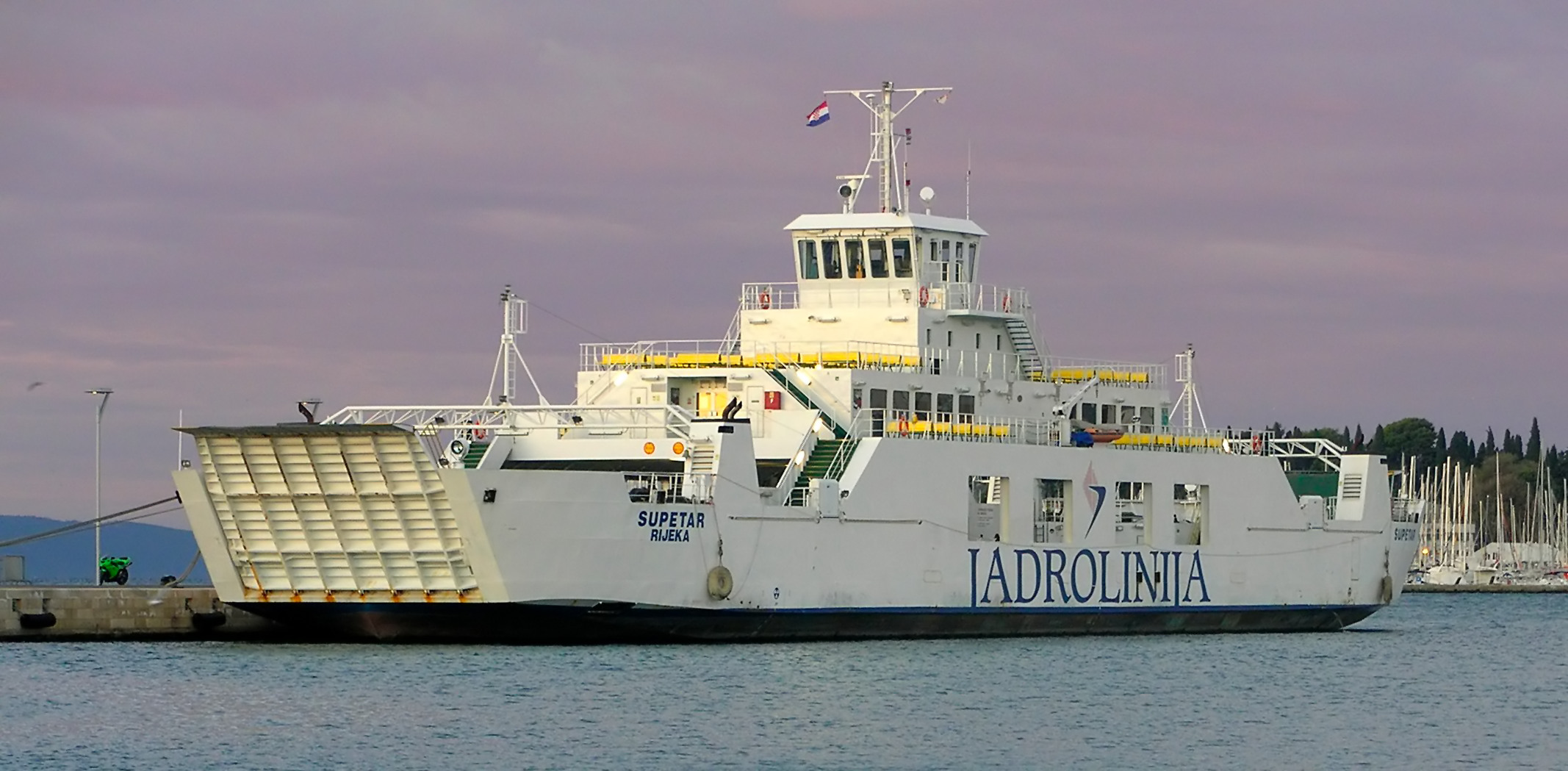
Automobile ferry in Croatia

Water transport is movement by means of a watercraft—such as a barge, boat, ship, or sailboat—over a body of water, such as a sea, ocean, lake, canal, or river. The need for buoyancy is common to watercraft, making the hull a critical aspect of its construction, maintenance, and appearance.

In the 19th century, the first steam ships were developed, using a steam engine to drive a paddle wheel or propeller to move the ship. The steam was produced in a boiler using wood or coal and fed through a steam external combustion engine. Now most commercial ships have an internal combustion engine using a slightly refined type of petroleum called bunker fuel. Some ships, such as submarines, use nuclear marine propulsion with heat from a nuclear reactor generating the steam. Recreational or educational craft still use wind power or oars, while some smaller craft use internal combustion engines to drive one or more propellers or, in the case of jet boats, an inboard water jet. In shallow draft areas, hovercraft are propelled by large pusher-prop fans. (See Marine propulsion.)

Although it is slow compared to other transport, modern sea transport is a highly efficient method of transporting large quantities of goods. Commercial vessels, nearly 35,000 in number, carried 7.4 billion tons of cargo in 2007. Transport by water is significantly less costly than air transport for transcontinental shipping; short sea shipping and ferries remain viable in coastal areas.

=== Other modes ===
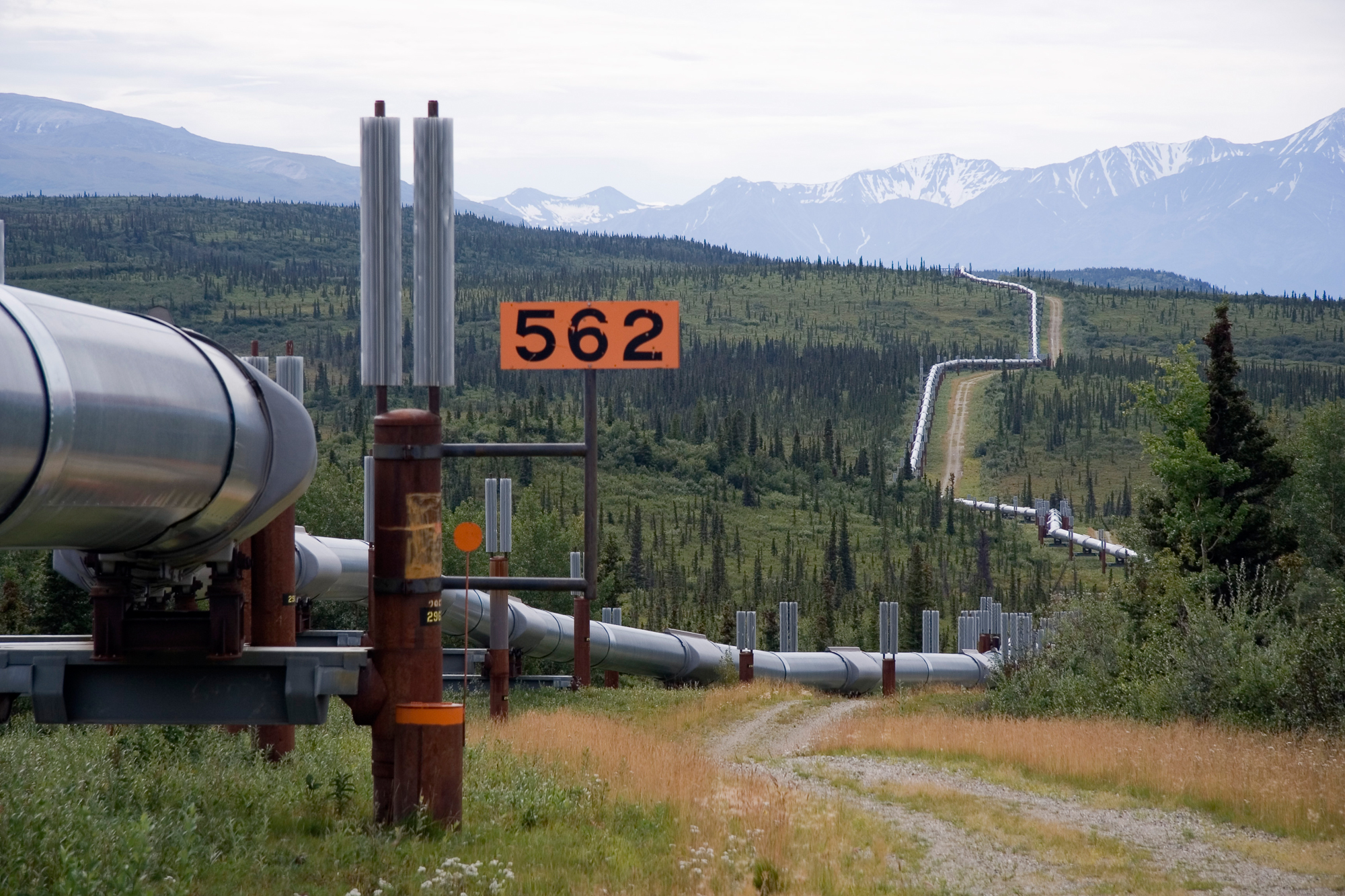
Trans-Alaska Pipeline for crude oil

Micromobility is the collective name for small electric powered vehicles.

Pipeline transport sends goods through a pipe; most commonly, chemically stable liquids, vapors, and gases can be sent, while a slurry can be used to transport solids. Pneumatic tubes can send solid capsules using compressed air. Short-distance systems exist for sewage, slurry, water, and beer, while long-distance networks are used for freshwater, petroleum, and natural gas.

Cable transport is a broad mode where vehicles are pulled by cables instead of an internal power source. It is most commonly used at steep gradient. Typical solutions include aerial tramways, funiculars, elevators, material ropeways, and ski lifts; some of these are also categorized as conveyor transport. A variant is the zip line, which uses gravity for propulsion.

Unmanned aerial vehicle transport (drone transport) is being used for medicine transportation in least developed countries with inadequate infrastructure. Amazon.com and other transportation companies are currently testing the use of unmanned aerial vehicles in parcel delivery. This method will allow short-range small-parcel delivery in a short time frame.

Spaceflight is transport outside Earth's atmosphere by means of a spacecraft. It is most frequently used for satellites placed in Earth orbit. However, human spaceflight mission have landed on the Moon and are occasionally used to rotate crew-members to space stations. Uncrewed spacecraft have been sent to all the planets of the Solar System.

Suborbital spaceflight is the fastest of the existing and planned transport systems from a place on Earth to a distant "other place" on Earth. These rocket-propelled systems could potentially do global point-to-point transport delivery of passengers or cargo in less than 90 minutes.

Vertical transport devices perform displacement in a vertical direction, although as a side effect they may also transport in a horizontal direction. These include:

- Cable cars, inlined planes, funiculars and rack railways
- Chair lifts, detachable chairlifts, funitels, gondola lifts and ski tows
- Elevators (classical lifts)
- Hot Air Balloons
- Escalators and inclined travelators
- Locks, boat lifts and inclined planes (on canals and rivers)
- Skyhooks and space elevators (hypothetical)

== Elements ==
=== Infrastructure ===
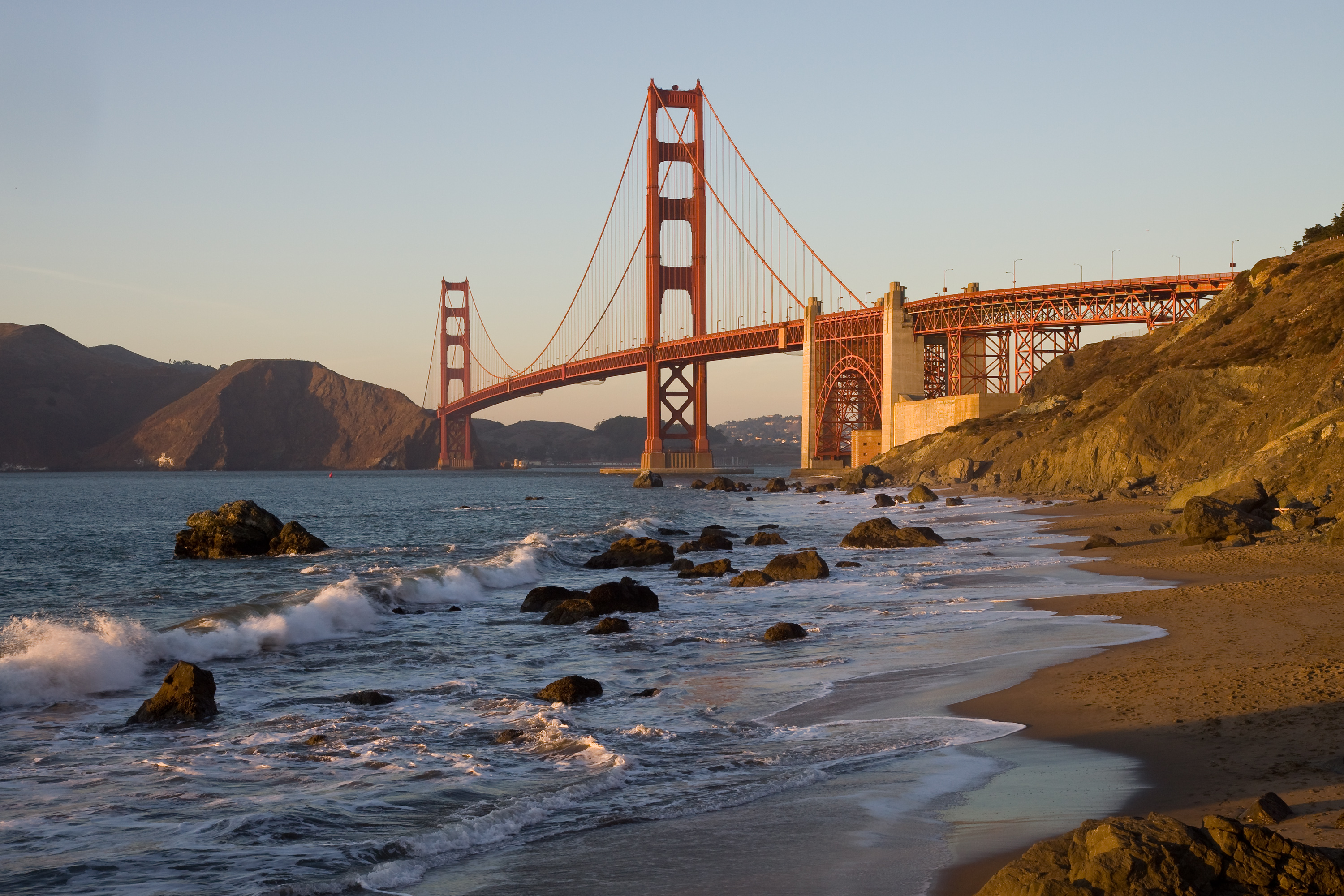
Bridges, such as Golden Gate Bridge, allow roads and railways to cross bodies of water.

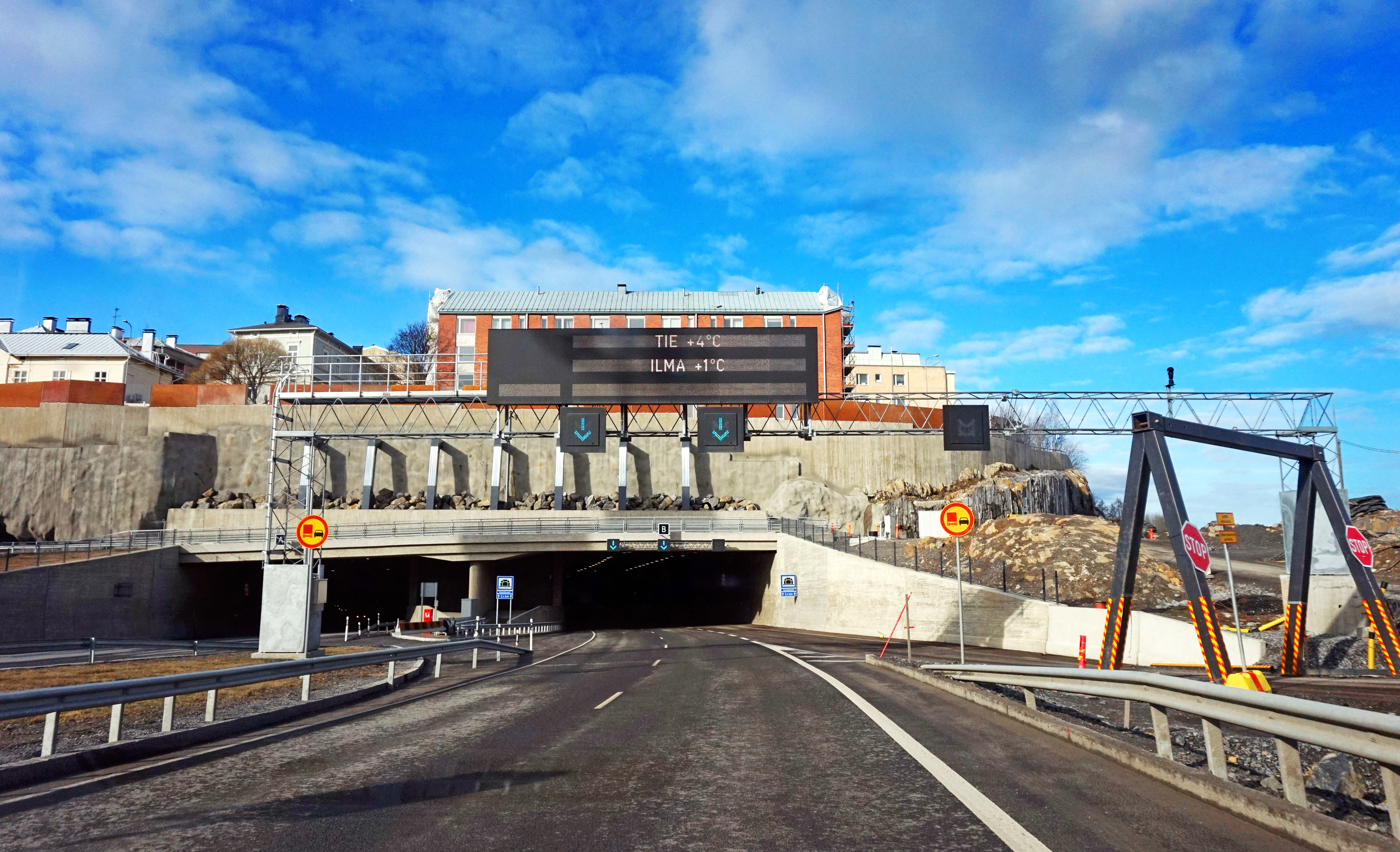
Tunnels, such as the Tampere Tunnel, allow traffic to pass underground or through rock formations.

Infrastructure is the fixed installations that allow a vehicle to operate. It consists of a transport network, a terminal, and facilities for parking and maintenance. For rail, pipeline, road, and cable transport, the entire way the vehicle travels must be constructed. Air and watercraft are able to avoid this, since the airway and seaway do not need to be constructed. However, they require fixed infrastructure at terminals.

Terminals such as airports, ports, and stations, are locations where passengers and freight can be transferred from one vehicle or mode to another. For passenger transport, terminals are integrating different modes to allow riders, who are interchanging between modes, to take advantage of each mode's benefits. For instance, airport rail links connect airports to the city centres and suburbs. The terminals for automobiles are parking lots, while buses and coaches can operate from simple stops. For freight, terminals act as transshipment points, though some cargo is transported directly from the point of production to the point of use.

The financing of infrastructure can either be public or private. Transport is often a natural monopoly and a necessity for the public; roads, and in some countries railways and airports, are funded through taxation. New infrastructure projects can have high costs and are often financed through debt. Many infrastructure owners, therefore, impose usage fees, such as landing fees at airports or toll plazas on roads. Independent of this, authorities may impose taxes on the purchase or use of vehicles. Because of poor forecasting and overestimation of passenger numbers by planners, there is frequently a benefits shortfall for transport infrastructure projects.

=== Means of transport ===
==== Animals ====
Animals used in transportation include pack animals and riding animals. These include various bovids, equids, and camelids; animal families noted for their muscular strength. Other species employed for various forms of transport include the dog, elephant, ostrich, sheep, and even the dolphin.

==== Vehicles ====
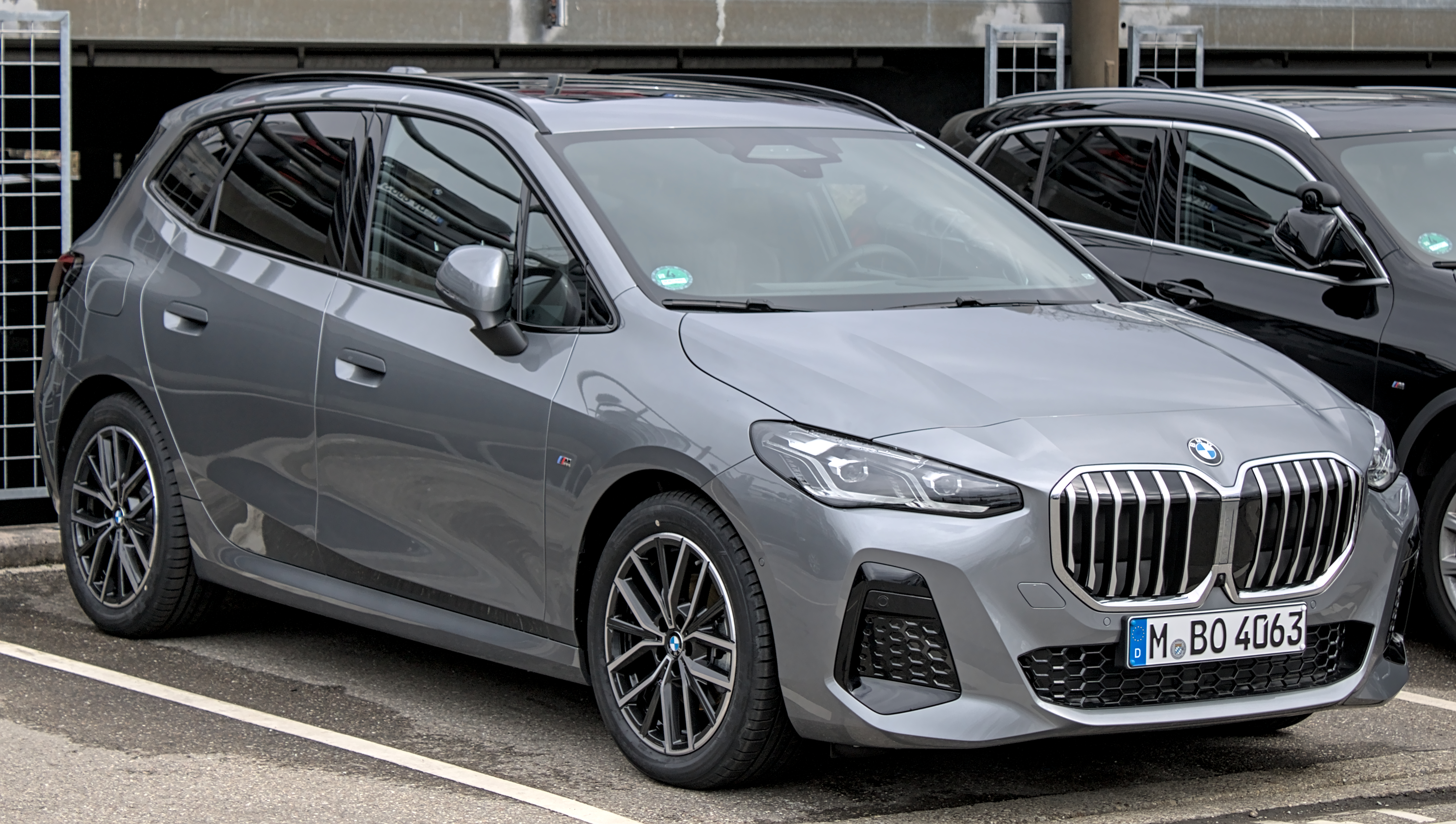
A BMW 2 Series Active Tourer in 2022

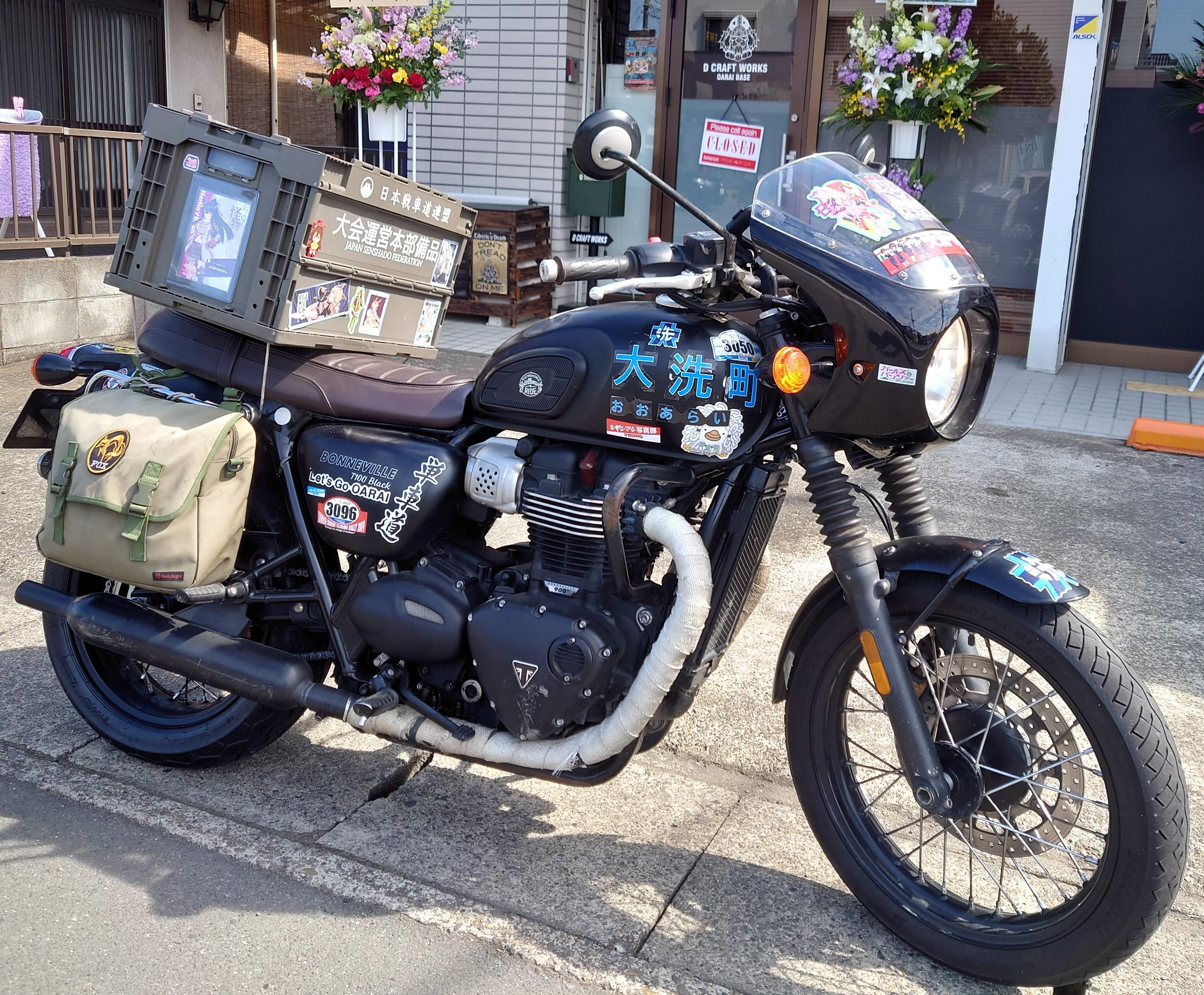
Customized motorcycle to maximize load capacity. Mobility is important for motorcycles, which are primarily used for transporting light cargo in urban areas.

A vehicle is a non-living device that is used to move people and goods. Unlike the infrastructure, the vehicle moves along with the cargo and riders. Unless being pulled/pushed by a cable or muscle-power, the vehicle must provide its own propulsion; this is most commonly done through a steam engine, combustion engine, electric motor, jet engine, or rocket, though other means of propulsion also exist such as sail power or compressed air. Vehicles also need a system of converting the energy into movement; this is most commonly done through wheels, propellers, and air pressure.

Vehicles are commonly staffed by a driver. However, some systems, such as people movers and some rapid transits, are fully automated. For passenger transport, the vehicle must have a compartment, seat, or platform for the passengers. Simple vehicles, such as automobiles, bicycles, or simple aircraft, may have one of the passengers as a driver. Since 2016, progress related to the Fourth Industrial Revolution has brought a lot of new emerging technologies for transportation and automotive fields such as connected vehicles and autonomous vehicles. These innovations are said to form future mobility, but concerns remain on safety and cybersecurity, particularly concerning connected and autonomous mobility.

=== Operation ===
Incheon International Airport, South Korea

Private transport is only subject to the owner of the vehicle, who operates the vehicle themselves. For public transport and freight transport, operations are done through private enterprise, governments, or a partnership between the two. The infrastructure and vehicles may be owned and operated by the same company, or they may be operated by different entities. Traditionally, many countries have had a national airline and national railway. Since the 1980s, many of these have been privatized. International shipping remains a highly competitive industry with little regulation, but ports can be public-owned.

=== Policy ===
As the population of the world increases, cities grow in size and population—according to the United Nations, 55% of the world's population live in cities, and by 2050 this number is expected to rise to 68%. Public transport policy must evolve to meet the changing priorities of the urban world. The institution of policy enforces a degree of order in transport, which is by nature chaotic as people attempt to travel from one place to another as rapidly as possible. This policy helps to reduce accidents and save lives.

== Comparison of the transport mode by distance travelled ==
Worldwide, the most widely used modes for passenger transport are the Automobile (16,000 bn passenger km), followed by Buses (7,000), Air (2,800), Railways (1,900), and Urban Rail (250).

The most widely used modes for freight transport are Sea (40,000 bn ton km), followed by Road (7,000), Railways (6,500), Oil pipelines (2,000) and Inland Navigation (1,500).

Passenger km per capita in different regions
	EU 15	US	Japan	World
GDP (PPP) per capita (€) (for comparison)	19,000	28,600	26,000	7,500
Private car	10,100	33,200	6,200	2,700
Bus/coach	1,050	150	740	1,200
Railway	750	78	2,900	32
Air (domestic except World)	860	2,800	580	480

== Functions ==
Relocation of travelers and cargo are the most common uses of transport. However, other uses exist, such as the transfer of mobile construction and emergency equipment, or the strategic and tactical relocation of armed forces during warfare.

=== Passenger ===
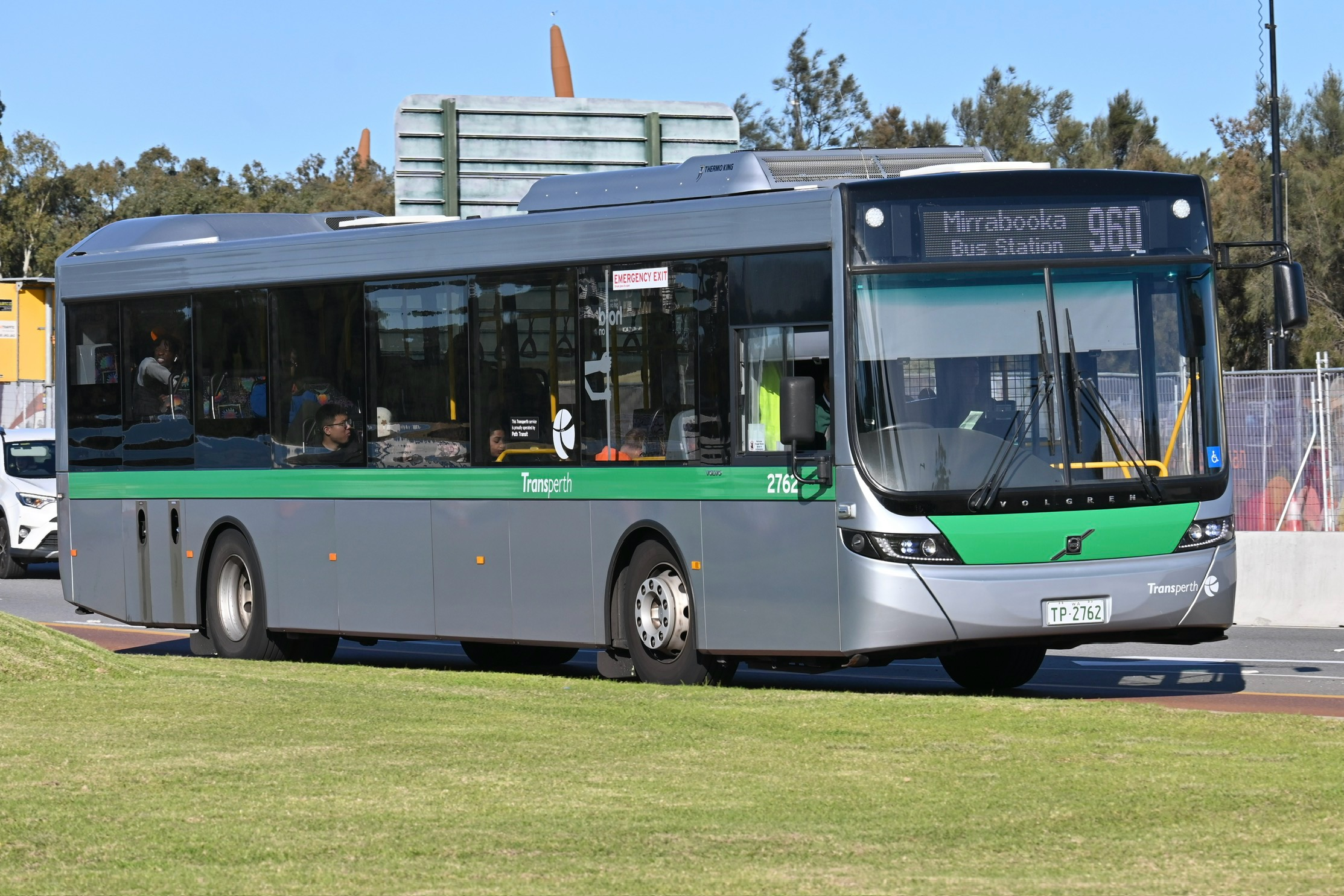
A local transit bus operated by Transperth in Perth, Australia

Passenger transport, or travel, is divided into public and private transport. Public transport is scheduled services on fixed routes, while private service can be scheduled (e.g. commercial airlines) or chartered (e.g. shipping) or can provide ad hoc services at the riders desire (e.g. taxi). The latter offers better flexibility, but has lower capacity and a higher environmental impact. Travel may be as part of daily commuting or for business, leisure, or migration.

Short-haul transport is dominated by the automobile and mass transit. The latter consists of buses in rural and small cities, supplemented with commuter rail, trams, and rapid transit in larger cities. Long-haul transport involves the use of the automobile, trains, ships, coaches, and aircraft, the last of which have become predominantly used for the longest, including intercontinental, travel. Intermodal passenger transport is where a journey is performed through the use of several modes of transport; since all human transport normally starts and ends with walking, all passenger transport can be considered intermodal. Public transport may also involve the intermediate change of vehicle, within or across modes, at a transport hub, such as a bus or railway station.

Taxis and buses can be found on both ends of the public transport spectrum. Buses are the cheapest mode of transport but are not necessarily flexible, and taxis are very flexible but more expensive. In the middle is demand-responsive transport, offering flexibility whilst remaining affordable.

International travel may be restricted for some individuals due to legislation and visa requirements.

=== Medical ===
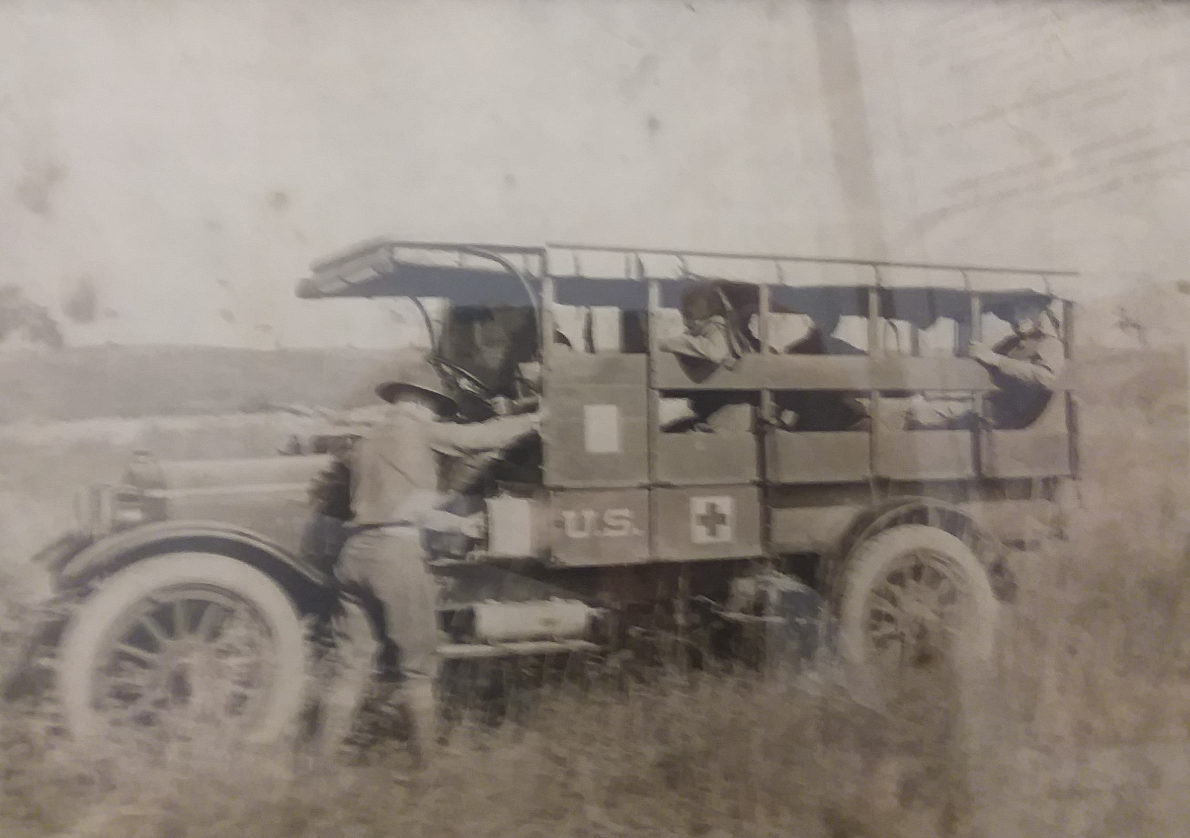
An ambulance from World War I

An ambulance is a vehicle used to transport people from or between places of treatment, and in some instances will also provide out-of-hospital medical care to the patient. The word is often associated with road-going "emergency ambulances", which form part of emergency medical services, administering emergency care to those with acute medical problems.

Air medical services is a comprehensive term covering the use of air transport to move patients to and from healthcare facilities and accident scenes. Personnel provide comprehensive prehospital and emergency and critical care to all types of patients during aeromedical evacuation or rescue operations, aboard helicopters, propeller aircraft, or jet aircraft.

=== Freight ===
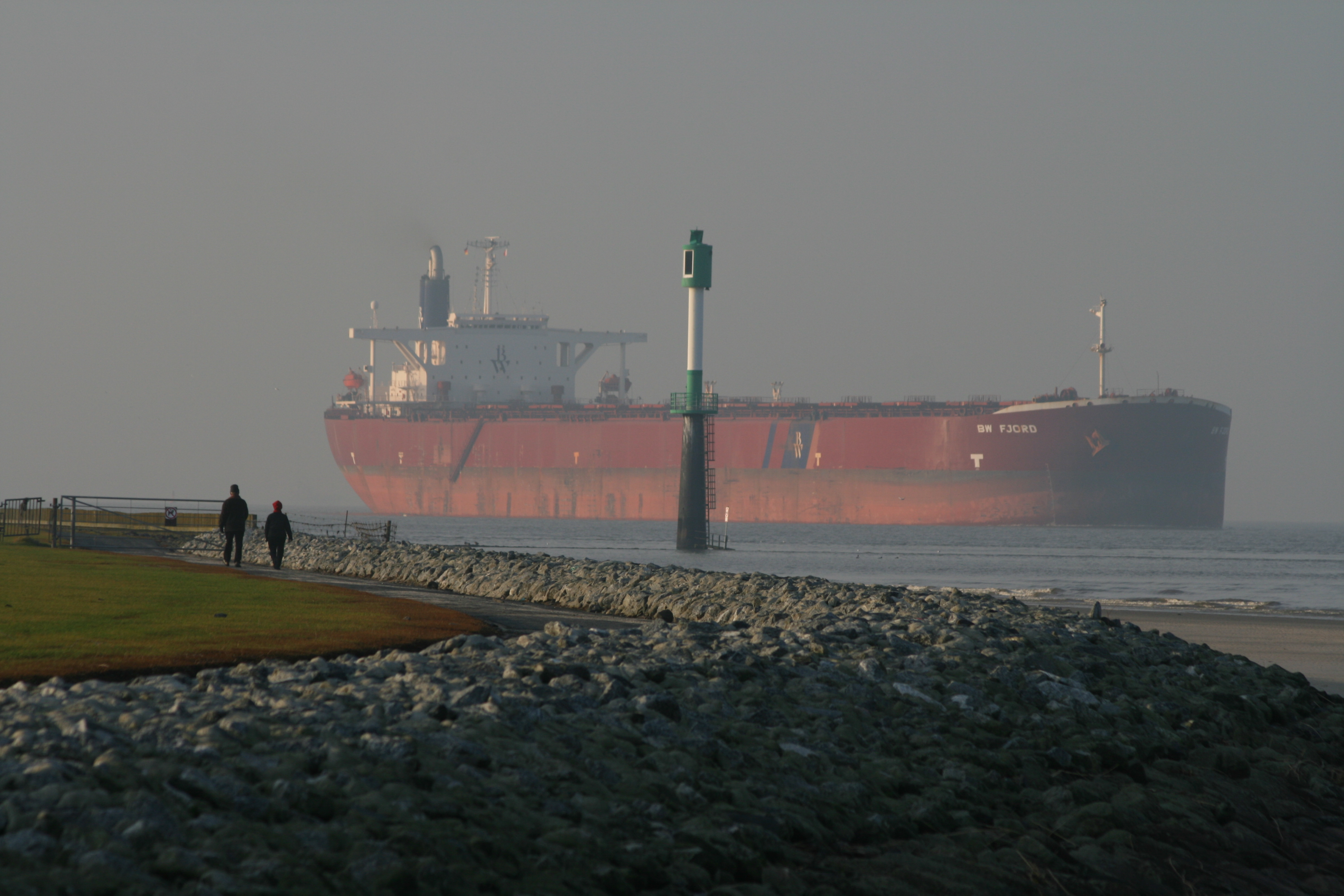
A bulk carrier, BW Fjord

Freight transport, or shipping, is a key in the value chain in manufacturing. With increased specialization and globalization, production is being located further away from consumption, rapidly increasing the demand for transport. Transport creates place utility by moving the goods from the place of production to the place of consumption. While all modes of transport are used for cargo transport, there is high differentiation between the nature of the cargo transport, in which mode is chosen. Logistics refers to the entire process of transferring products from producer to consumer, including storage, transport, transshipment, warehousing, material-handling, and packaging, with associated exchange of information. Incoterm deals with the handling of payment and responsibility of risk during transport.

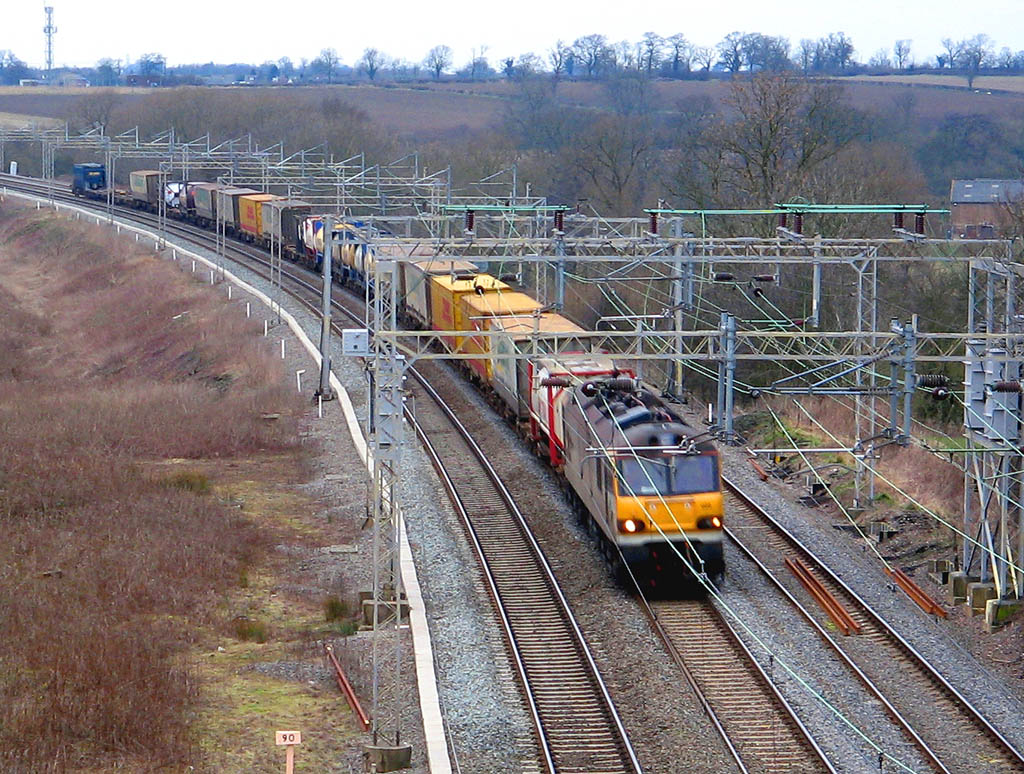
Freight train with shipping containers in the United Kingdom

Containerization, with the standardization of ISO containers on all vehicles and at all ports, has revolutionized international and domestic trade, offering a huge reduction in transshipment costs. Traditionally, all cargo had to be manually loaded and unloaded into the haul of any ship or car; containerization allows for automated handling and transfer between modes, and the standardized sizes allow for gains in economy of scale in vehicle operation. This has been one of the key driving factors in international trade and globalization since the 1950s.

Bulk transport is common with cargo that can be handled roughly without significant deterioration; typical examples are ore, coal, cereals, and petroleum. Because of the uniformity of the product, mechanical handling can allow enormous quantities to be handled quickly and efficiently. The low value of the cargo combined with high volume also means that economies of scale become essential in transport, and gigantic ships and whole trains are commonly used to transport bulk. Liquid products with sufficient volume may also be transported by pipeline.

Air freight has become more common for products of high value; while less than one percent of world transport by volume is by airline, it amounts to forty percent of the value. Time has become especially important in regards to principles such as postponement and just-in-time within the value chain, resulting in a high willingness to pay for quick delivery of key components or items of high value-to-weight ratio. In addition to mail, common items sent by air include electronics and fashion clothing.

== Industry ==
The transport/transportation and logistics industry is a category of companies that provide services to transport people or goods. The Global Industry Classification Standard (GICS) lists transport below the industrials sector. The sector consists of several industries including logistics and air freight or airlines, marine, road and rail, and their respective infrastructures. Entire stock market indexes focus on the sector, like the Dow Jones Transportation Index (DJTA).

In the EU, the transport industry directly employs around 10 million people and accounts for about 5% of the gross domestic product (GDP). Logistics account for 10–15% of the cost of a finished product for European companies. On average 13.2% of every household's budget is spent on transport, which still depends heavily on fossil fuels and represents an important source of CO_{2} emissions. Emissions from road freight transport have risen by more than 20% since 1995, counterweighting the increased energy efficiency of vehicles.

Logistics and transport as the basis of global trade is worth over 5.7 trillion Euros.

Digitalisation and the expansion of e-commerce are gradually changing the transport and logistics industry. Modern logistics networks are now characterised by real-time tracking, data-oriented route optimisation and cross-border fulfilment to complement traditional freight and passenger services.

== Impact ==
In the three-sector model of economics, transportation is a component of the tertiary sector that provides services for a functioning economy. Thus, the inefficiency and malfunctioning of transport creates an economic impact. Even when functioning effectively, the operation of a transportation network can have an adverse effect on the environment and human safety. For example, road traffic accidents are one of the leading causes of death world-wide, killing or injuring nearly 1.35 million people every year. The planning, design, maintenance, and operation of facilities for different transport modes is performed through transportation engineering. Their goal is to provide for the safe, efficient, rapid, comfortable, convenient, economical, and environmentally compatible movement of people and goods transport.

=== Economic ===
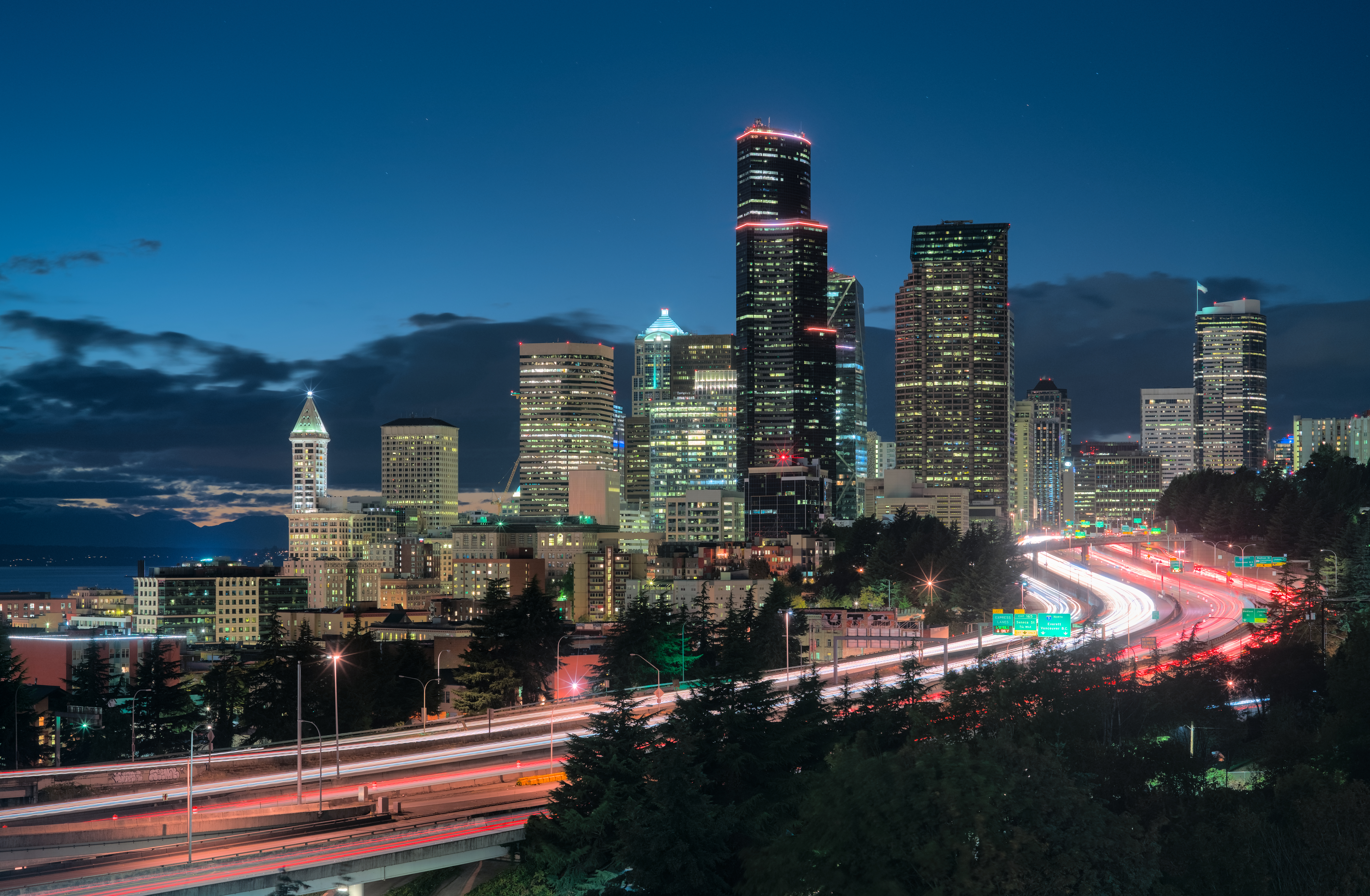
Transport is a key component of growth and globalization, such as in Seattle, Washington, United States.

Transport is a key necessity for specialization—allowing production and consumption of products to occur at different locations. Throughout history, transport has been a spur to expansion; better transport allows more trade and a greater spread of people. Economic growth has always been dependent on increasing the capacity and rationality of transport. But the infrastructure and operation of transport have a great impact on the land, and transport is the largest drainer of energy, making transport sustainability a major issue.

Due to the way modern cities and communities are planned and operated, a physical distinction between home and work is usually created, forcing people to transport themselves to places of work, study, or leisure, as well as to temporarily relocate for other daily activities. Passenger transport is the essence of tourism, a major part of recreational transport. Commerce requires the transport of people to conduct business, either to allow face-to-face communication for important decisions or to move specialists from their regular place of work to sites where they are needed.

In lean thinking, transporting materials or work in process from one location to another is seen as one of the seven wastes (Japanese term: muda) which do not add value to a product.

=== Planning ===
Transport planning allows for high use and less impact regarding new infrastructure. Using models of transport forecasting, planners are able to predict future transport patterns. On the operative level, logistics allows owners of cargo to plan transport as part of the supply chain. Transport as a field is studied through transport economics, a component for the creation of regulation policy by authorities. Transport engineering, a sub-discipline of civil engineering, must take into account trip generation, trip distribution, mode choice, and route assignment, while the operative level is handled through traffic engineering.

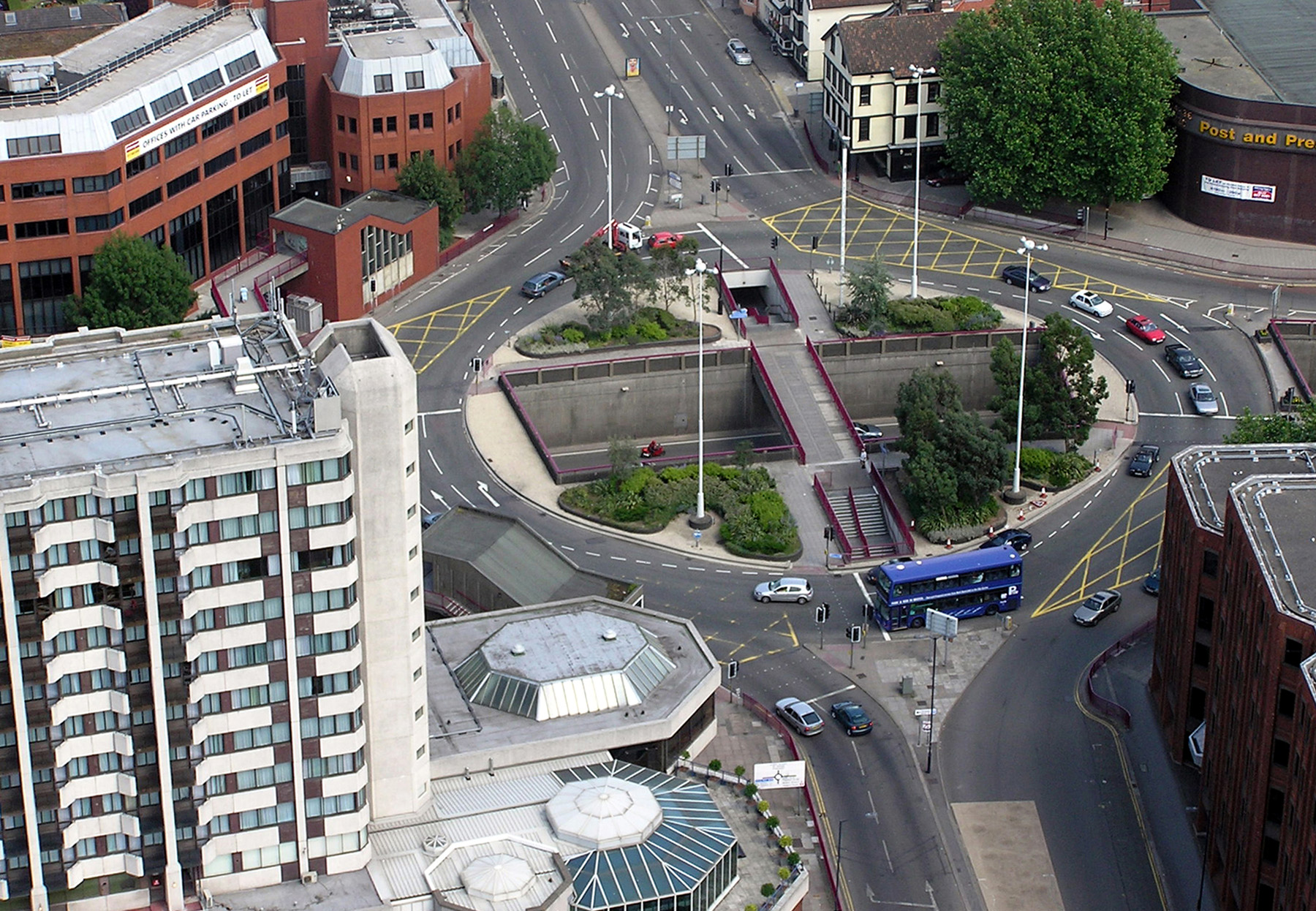
The engineering of this roundabout in Bristol, United Kingdom, attempts to make traffic flow free-moving.

Because of the negative impacts incurred, transport often becomes the subject of controversy related to choice of mode, as well as increased capacity. Automotive transport can be seen as a tragedy of the commons, where the flexibility and comfort for the individual deteriorate the natural and urban environment for all. Density of development depends on mode of transport, with public transport allowing for better spatial use. Good land use keeps common activities close to people's homes and places higher-density development closer to transport lines and hubs, to minimize the need for transport. There are economies of agglomeration. Beyond transport, some land uses are more efficient when clustered. Transport facilities consume land, and in cities pavement (devoted to streets and parking) can easily exceed 20 percent of the total land use. An efficient transport system can reduce land waste.

Too much infrastructure and too much smoothing for maximum vehicle throughput mean that in many cities there is too much traffic and many—if not all—of the negative impacts that come with it. It is only in recent years that traditional practices have started to be questioned in many places; as a result of new types of analysis which bring in a much broader range of skills than those traditionally relied on—spanning such areas as environmental impact analysis, public health, sociology, and economics—the viability of the old mobility solutions is increasingly being questioned.

=== Safety ===
The energy levels involved in a transport accident can pose a significant risk for crew and passengers, making safety an issue of importance to governments. Significant accidents involve a review by law enforcement and independent investigators from a safety board, such as the NTSB in the U.S. Measures and methods have been implemented to improve the safety of roads, automobiles, motorcycles, bicycles, railways, ships, and aircraft. There are emergency medical services and sea rescue measures for rapid response to transport emergencies. Statistics are gathered from accidents, then analyzed and used to determine safety measures to lower the casualty rate.

=== Environment ===
Global greenhouse gas emissions from transportation in 2016:
1. Cars (40.0%)
2. Trucks (34.0%)
3. Planes (11.0%)
4. Boats (11.0%)
5. Trains (4.00%)

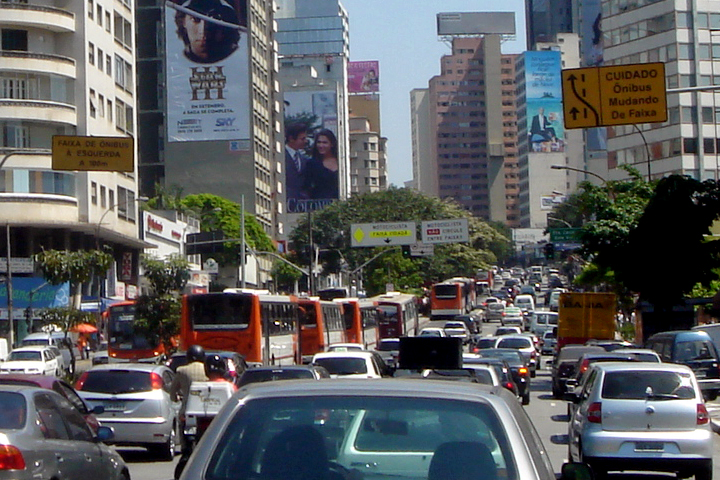
Traffic congestion persists in São Paulo, Brazil, despite the no-drive days based on license numbers.

Transport is a major use of energy and burns most of the world's petroleum. This creates air pollution, including nitrous oxides and particulates, and is a significant contributor to global warming through emission of carbon dioxide, for which transport is the fastest-growing emission sector. According to the International Energy Agency (IEA), the transportation sector accounts for more than one-third of CO_{2} emissions globally in the early 2020ies. By sub-sector, road transport is the largest contributor to global warming. Environmental regulations in developed countries have reduced individual vehicles' emissions; however, this has been offset by increases in the numbers of vehicles and in the use of each vehicle. Some pathways to reduce the carbon emissions of road vehicles considerably have been studied. Energy use and emissions vary largely between modes, causing environmentalists to call for a transition from air and road to rail and human-powered transport, as well as increased transport electrification and energy efficiency.

Other environmental impacts of transport systems include traffic congestion and automobile-oriented urban sprawl, which can consume natural habitat and agricultural lands. By reducing transport emissions globally, it is predicted that there will be significant positive effects on Earth's air quality, acid rain, smog, and climate change.

While electric cars are being built to cut down CO_{2} emission at the point of use, an approach that is becoming popular among cities worldwide is to prioritize public transport, bicycles, and pedestrian movement. Redirecting vehicle movement to create 20-minute neighbourhoods that promotes exercise while greatly reducing vehicle dependency and pollution. Some policies are levying a congestion charge to cars for travelling within congested areas during peak time.

Airplane emissions change depending on the flight distance. It takes a lot of energy to take off and land, so longer flights are more efficient per mile traveled. However, longer flights naturally use more fuel in total. Short flights produce the most CO_{2} per passenger mile, while long flights produce slightly less. Things get worse when planes fly high in the atmosphere. Their emissions trap much more heat than those released at ground level. This is not just because of CO_{2}, but a mix of other greenhouse gases in the exhaust. In 2022 global CO_{2} emissions from the transport sector grew by more than 250 Mt CO_{2} to nearly 8 Gt CO_{2}, which represent more than 3% compared to 2021. Aviation was responsible for a significant part of that increase.

City buses produce about 0.3 kg of CO_{2} for every mile traveled per passenger. For long-distance bus trips (over 20 miles), that pollution drops to about 0.08 kg of CO_{2} per passenger mile. On average, commuter trains produce around 0.17 kg of CO_{2} for each mile traveled per passenger. Long-distance trains are slightly higher at about 0.19 kg of CO_{2} per passenger mile. The fleet emission average for delivery vans, trucks and big rigs is 10.17 kg (22.4 lb) CO_{2} per gallon of diesel consumed. Delivery vans and trucks average about 7.8 mpg (or 1.3 kg of CO_{2} per mile) while big rigs average about 5.3 mpg (or 1.92 kg of CO_{2} per mile).

=== Sustainable development ===
The United Nations first formally recognized the role of transport in sustainable development in the 1992 United Nations Earth summit. In the 2012 United Nations World Conference, global leaders unanimously recognized that transport and mobility are central to achieving the sustainability targets. Since then, data has been collected to show that the transport sector contributes to a quarter of the global greenhouse gas emissions, and therefore sustainable transport has been mainstreamed across several of the 2030 Sustainable Development Goals, especially those related to food, security, health, energy, economic growth, infrastructure, and cities and human settlements. Meeting sustainable transport targets is said to be particularly important to achieving the Paris Agreement.

There are various Sustainable Development Goals (SDGs) that are promoting sustainable transport to meet the defined goals. These include SDG 3 on health (increased road safety), SDG 7 on energy, SDG 8 on decent work and economic growth, SDG 9 on resilient infrastructure, SDG 11 on sustainable cities (access to transport and expanded public transport), SDG 12 on sustainable consumption and production (ending fossil fuel subsidies), and SDG 14 on oceans, seas, and marine resources.

Contemporary development studies recognise transportation networks as a key element of economic development, socio-economic well-being and poverty reduction. However, road network development has not always fulfilled its original intentions and has contributed significantly to environmental degradation and, in some cases, led to the loss of cultural traditions and the marginalisation of indigenous peoples. Compared to roads, the development of air links (helicopters and planes) has had an even more devastating impact. What is more, helicopters used for tourist activities are subject to considerable criticism from a perspective of environmental protection as well as sports ethics.

== History ==
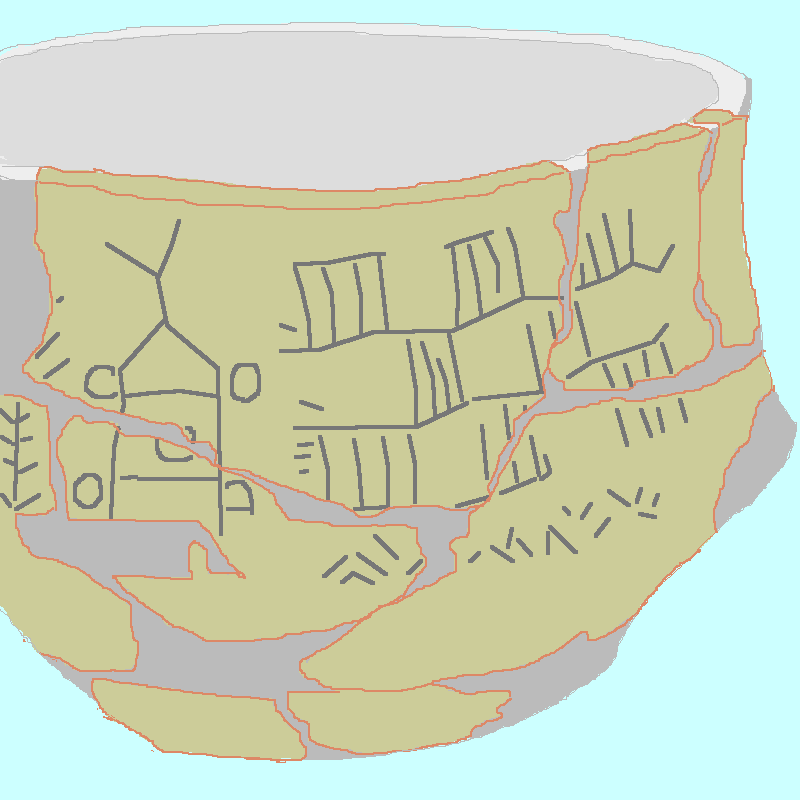
Bronocice pot with the earliest known image of a wheeled vehicle in the world, found in Poland

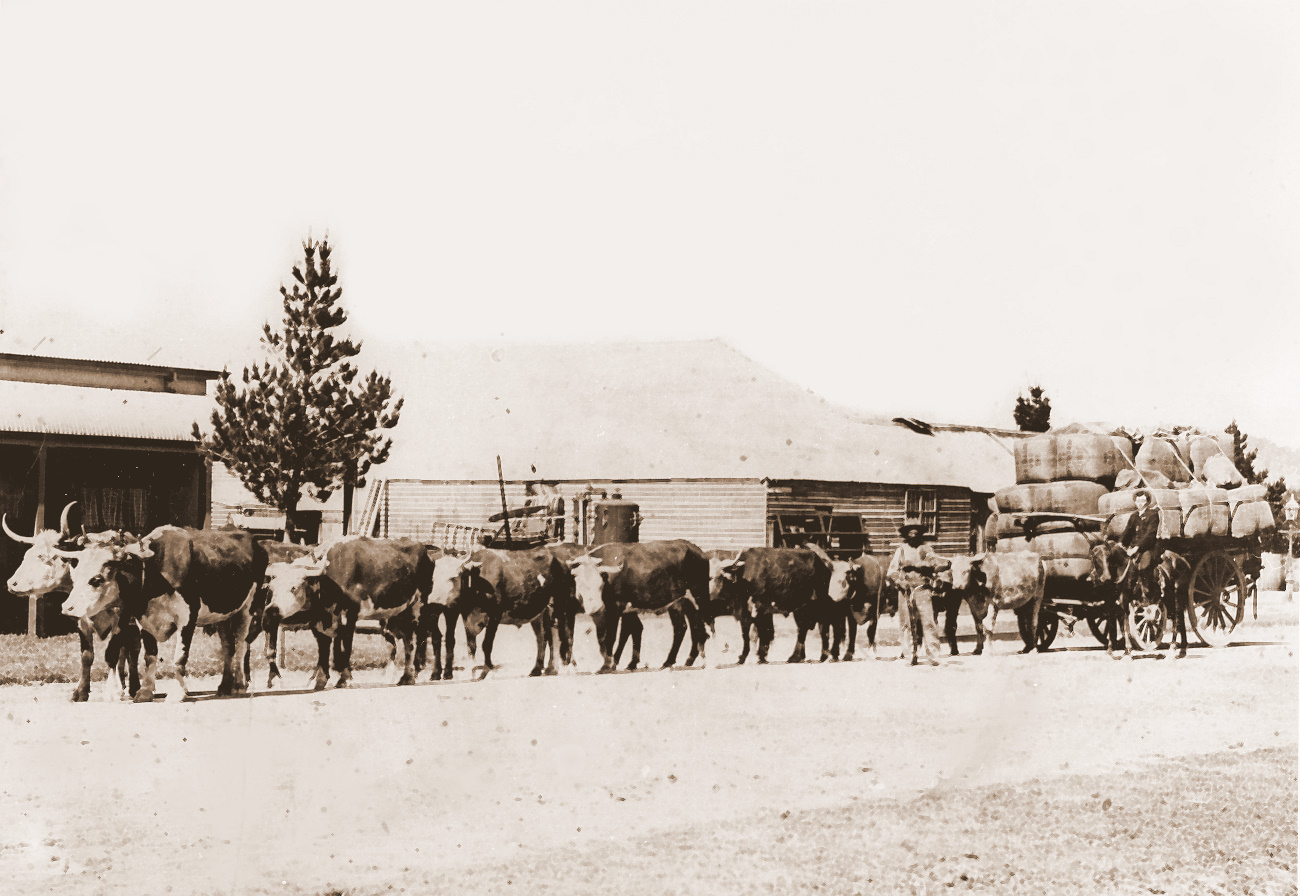
A bullock team hauling wool in Australia

=== Natural ===
Humans' first ways to move included walking, running, and swimming. The domestication of animals introduced a new way to lay the burden of transport on more powerful creatures, allowing the hauling of heavier loads, or humans riding animals for greater speed and duration. Inventions such as the wheel and the sled (U.K. sledge) helped make animal transport more efficient through the introduction of vehicles.

The first forms of road transport involved animals, such as horses (domesticated in the 4th or the 3rd millennium BCE), oxen (from about 8000 BCE), or humans carrying goods over dirt tracks that often followed game trails.

=== Water transport ===
Water transport, including rowed and sailed vessels, dates back to time immemorial and was the only efficient way to transport large quantities or over large distances prior to the Industrial Revolution. The first watercraft were canoes either cut out from tree trunks or made of animal hides. Early deep water transport was accomplished with ships that were either rowed or used the wind for propulsion, or a combination of the two. The importance of water has led to most cities that grew up as sites for trading being located on rivers or on the sea-shore, often at the intersection of two bodies of water.

=== Mechanical ===
Until the Industrial Revolution, transport remained slow and costly, and production and consumption gravitated as close to each other as feasible. The Industrial Revolution in the 19th century saw several inventions fundamentally change transport. With the optical telegraph, communication became rapid and independent of the transport of physical objects. The invention of the steam engine, closely followed by its application in rail transport, made land transport independent of human or animal muscles. Both speed and capacity increased, allowing specialization through manufacturing being located independently of natural resources. The 19th century also saw the development of the steam ship, which sped up global transport.

With the development of the combustion engine and the automobile around 1900, road transport became more competitive again, and mechanical private transport originated. The first "modern" highways were constructed during the 19th century with macadam. Later, tarmac and concrete became the dominant paving materials.

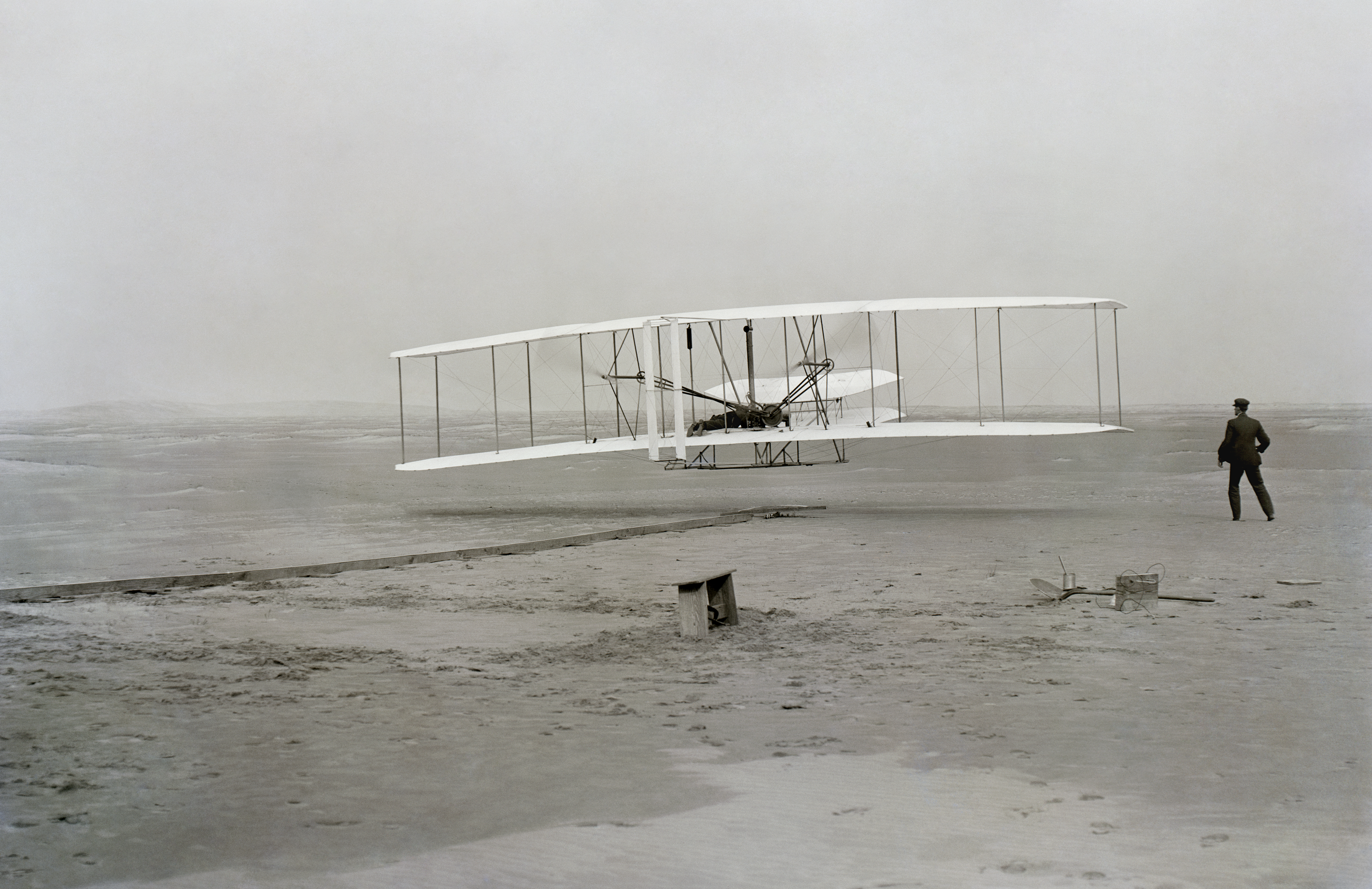
The Wright brothers' first flight in 1903

In 1903 the Wright brothers demonstrated the first successful controllable airplane, and after World War I (1914–1918) aircraft became a fast way to transport people and express goods over long distances.

After World War II (1939–1945) the automobile and airlines took higher shares of transport, reducing rail and water to freight and short-haul passenger services. Scientific spaceflight began in the 1950s, with rapid growth until the 1970s, when interest dwindled. In the 1950s the introduction of containerization gave massive efficiency gains in freight transport, fostering globalization. International air travel became much more accessible in the 1960s with the commercialization of the jet engine. Along with the growth in automobiles and motorways, rail and water transport declined in relative importance. After the introduction of the Shinkansen in Japan in 1964, high-speed rail in Asia and Europe started attracting passengers on long-haul routes away from the airlines.

In the U.S. during the 19th century, private joint-stock corporations owned most aqueducts, bridges, canals, railroads, roads, and tunnels. Most such transport infrastructure came under government control in the late 19th and early 20th centuries, culminating in the nationalization of inter-city passenger rail-service with the establishment of Amtrak. However, as recently as 2010, a movement to privatize roads and other infrastructure has gained ground and adherents.

== See also ==
- Car-free movement
- Energy efficiency in transport
- Environmental impact of aviation
- Free public transport
- Green transport hierarchy
- Hazardous Materials Transportation Act
- Health and environmental impact of transport
- Health impact of light rail systems
- IEEE Intelligent Transportation Systems Society
- Journal of Transport and Land Use
- List of emerging transportation technologies
- Outline of transport
- Personal rapid transit
- Public transport accessibility level
- Rail transport by country
- Speed record
- Taxicabs by country
- Transport divide

== Bibliography ==
- Bardi, Edward; Coyle, John & Novack, Robert (2006). Management of Transportation. Australia: Thomson South-Western. ISBN 0-324-31443-4. OCLC 62259402.
- Chopra, Sunil & Meindl, Peter (2007). Supply chain management: strategy, planning, and operation (3rd ed.). Upper Saddle River, N.J.: Pearson. ISBN 978-0-13-208608-0. OCLC 63808135.
- Cooper, Christopher P.; Shepherd, Rebecca (1998). Tourism: Principles and Practice (2nd ed.). Harlow, England: Financial Times Prent. Int. ISBN 978-0-582-31273-9. OCLC 39945061.
- Lay, Maxwell G (1992). Ways of the World: A History of the World's Roads and of the Vehicles that Used Them. New Brunswick, N.J.: Rutgers University Press. ISBN 0-8135-2691-4. OCLC 804297312.
- Stopford, Martin (1997). Maritime Economics (2nd ed.). London: Routledge. ISBN 0-415-15310-7. OCLC 36824728.
