= Sierra Wireless =

Canadian wireless communications company

Sierra Wireless, Inc.
- Type: Subsidiary
- Industry: Communication equipment; connectivity services; Internet of Things (IoT)
- Founded: 1993; 33 years ago in Richmond, British Columbia
- Headquarters: Richmond, British Columbia, Canada (global)
- Products: Mobile broadband devices; embedded wireless modules; wireless gateways and routers; M2M cloud platform; connectivity services
- Number of employees: 1,000
- Parent: Semtech
- Website: www.sierrawireless.com

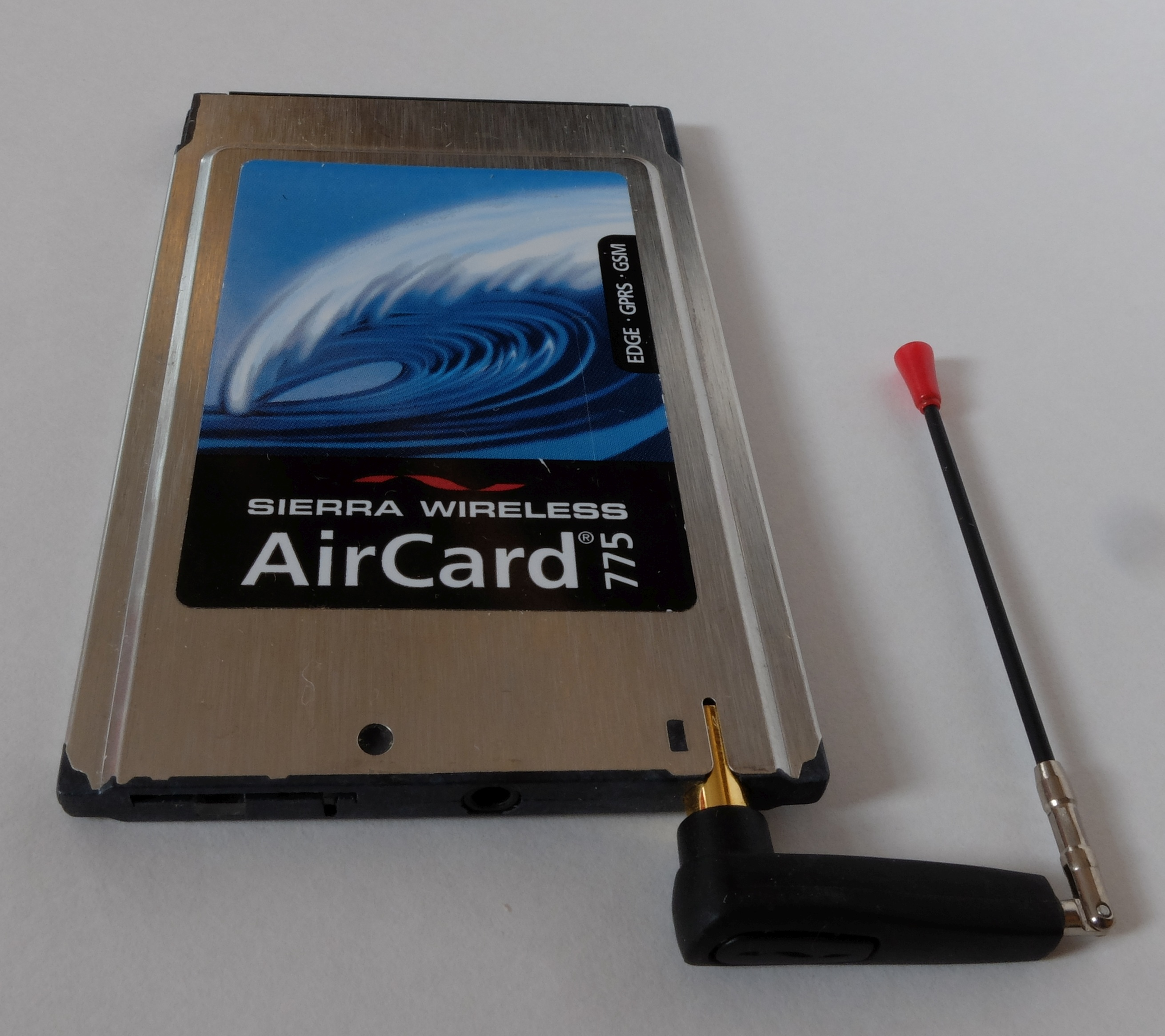
Sierra Wireless AirCard 775 wireless modem (2004)

Sierra Wireless (a subsidiary of Semtech Corporation) is a Canadian multinational wireless communications equipment designer, manufacturer and services provider headquartered in Richmond, British Columbia, Canada. It also maintains offices and operations in the United States, Korea, Japan, Taiwan, India, France, Australia and New Zealand.

The company sells mobile computing and machine-to-machine (M2M) communications products that work over cellular networks, 2G, 3G, 4G and 5G mobile broadband wireless routers and gateways, modules, as well as software, tools, and services.

Sierra Wireless products and technologies are used in a variety of markets and industries, including automotive and transportation, energy, field service, healthcare, industrial and infrastructure, mobile computing and consumers, networking, sales and payment, and security. It also maintains a network of experts in mobile broadband and M2M integration to support customers worldwide.

The company's products are sold directly to original equipment manufacturers (OEMs), as well as indirectly through distributors and resellers.

== History ==
Sierra Wireless was founded in 1993 in Vancouver, Canada. In August 2003, it completed an acquisition of privately held, high-speed CDMA wireless modules supplier, AirPrime, issuing approximately 3.7 million shares to AirPrime shareholders. On March 6, 2007, the company announced its purchase of Hayward, California-based AirLink Communications, a privately held developer of fixed, portable, and mobile wireless data solutions. Prior to the May 2007 completion of its sale to Sierra Wireless for a total of $27 million in cash and stock, AirLink had reported $24.8 million in revenues and gross margin of 44 percent.

In August 2008, Sierra Wireless purchased the assets of Junxion, a Seattle based producer of Linux-based mobile wireless access points and network routers for enterprise and government customers. In December 2008, Sierra Wireless made a friendly all-cash bid to acquire Wavecom, a French M2M wireless technology developer. The sale was completed for $275 million.

In August 2012, the company acquired SAGEMCOM's M2M business in a cash transaction of EUR44.9 million plus assumed liabilities. In November 2012, Sierra Wireless was recognized as an M2M market leader by market research and intelligence firm, ABI Research. Based on the company's aggregated revenues, ABI found that Sierra Wireless held a 34 percent share of the M2M module market.

In January 2013, Sierra Wireless sold all assets and operations related to its AirCard business to NETGEAR, Inc. for $138 million in cash plus approximately $6.5 million in assumed liabilities.

In April 2017, Sierra Wireless acquired GlobalTop Technology's GNSS embedded modules business for $3.2 million. In December, 2017, Sierra Wireless acquired Numerex, in a deal estimated at US$107 million.

In 2020, Sierra Wireless completed the acquisition of M2M Group in Australia for US$18.4 million and M2M One in New Zealand for US$3.5 million. In the same year, the company sold its automotive business for US$144 million. In April 2020, Sierra Wireless appointed Samuel Cochrane as Chief Financial Officer. In November 2020, Sierra Wireless sold its automotive modules division to Rolling Wireless.

In July 2021, Sierra Wireless appointed Phil Brace as CEO.

In August 2022, Semtech agreed to buy Sierra Wireless in an all-cash transaction valued at US$1.2 billion including debt. The acquisition was completed in January 2023.

== Patents and technology ==
Sierra Wireless has been granted more than 550 unique patents for an array of technologies ranging from built-in antennas and product form factors, to battery power usage and management and network efficiency improvements. The company currently has patents pending in the US, Europe, Asia, Australia, Mexico, and South Africa.

== Products ==
Sierra Wireless offers IoT products and services including the following:

- AirLink, wireless gateways used in industrial, enterprise, and automotive applications. AirLink intelligent gateways and routers use embedded intelligence and the ALEOS Application Framework to support remote management, control, and configuration, and application services for vertical market solutions.
- Embedded modules providing cellular connectivity for wireless mobile computing and M2M often used by device manufacturers to bring new 3G - 5G, GSM, and CDMA devices to market via PCI Express MiniCards, surface-mount modules, modem-only functionality, and programmable devices.
- AirVantage, a cloud-based application facilitating M2M service delivery consisting of the AirVantage Management Service M2M device management application, and AirVantage Enterprise Platform for collecting, sharing, and integration of machine data using API standards, as well as development and deployment of M2M applications.
- Octave, The All-in-One Edge-to-Cloud Solution for connecting industrial assets.
- Global Connectivity Services.
- Managed Network Services, providing internet management under a single vendor for a complete solution.
- Managed IoT Solutions, for agencies and enterprises that require tracking and monitoring. Available as fully-integrated managed services that includes asset/cargo tracking, satellite tracking, fleet tracking and remote monitoring.

Until the 2013 sale of all assets and operations, Sierra Wireless also manufactured and marketed AirCard, mobile broadband devices permitting users to connect notebooks, netbooks, and other electronics to the Internet over 3G and 4G mobile broadband networks via PC or express card slots, USB ports, or mobile WiFi hotspots.

== Community support ==
Sierra Wireless is an active United Way of the Lower Mainland supporter. For its efforts, the company was recognized with United Way Employee Gold Awards and a 2002 Award of Excellence.

In 2003, Canadian public university Simon Fraser University announced the creation of the Sierra Wireless Chair in Wireless Communication, which was funded through annual donations for a three-year period. Upon completion of the original three-year term, the company extended its partnership with the university by establishing an endowed Sierra Wireless Professorship in Mobile Communication. In partnership with the university's School of Engineering Science in the Faculty of Applied Sciences, the Sierra Wireless Mobile Communications Laboratory was opened in November 2012.

== See also ==
- Sierra Wireless Voq
