= Numerex =

- Traded as: NMRX
- Industry: Managed machine-to machine
- Founded: 1992
- Successor: Sierra Wireless
- Headquarters: Atlanta
- Website: www.numerex.com

Numerex Corp. (formerly NASDAQ:NMRX) is an American provider of managed machine-to-machine (M2M) The company offers end-to-end services including devices, network connectivity, and applications for asset tracking, remote monitoring, and industrial automation. Founded in 1992, Numerex became a wholly owned subsidiary of Sierra Wireless NASDAQ:(SWIR) in 2017.

== History ==
Numerex was founded in 1992 and was first publicly traded in March 1994. On September 1, 2015 Marc Zionts was appointed as CEO and President of this company.

In May 1998, Cellemetrry LLC was formed between Numerex Corp., BellSouth Corporation and BellSouth Wireless, This was a joint venture between Numerex and Cingular. In November 1999, Numerex sold the wireline business to British Telecommunications PLC ("BT"). On March 28, 2003, Numerex acquired Cingular's interest in Cellemetry LLC.

During this period, Numerex developed a Short Message Service Center (SMSC)-operated service bureau, "Data1Source", providing SMS-related services to tier 2 and 3 carriers throughout the US. Data1Source was later sold.

At the beginning of 2006, Numerex acquired the assets of Airdesk, Inc.

In 2007, Numerex acquired the assets of Orbit One Communications, Inc..

In October 2008, Numerex acquired Ublip. Ublip's platform enabled rapid development of web-based, device- and OS-independent M2M applications. The acquisition added middleware and virtual-hosting capabilities to Numerex's infrastructure.

In February 2013, Numerex acquired AVIDwireless™. In December 2013, it acquired i3G under the i-Tank™ brand.

In April 2014, Numerex acquired Omnilink Systems.

In March 2015, Numerex launched SmartGuide, an economical, unlimited satellite-based global tracking solution featuring the SX1 device and a 32-satellite Low Earth Orbit (LEO) network. It delivers location and status updates as frequently as every five minutes, and the SX1 device meets environmental standards, including HERO certification (Hazards of Electromagnetic Radiation to Ordnance).

In September 2015, the company announced their recent implementation of the mySHIELD solution, connected by Verizon. The company also announced the "LTE for the IoT" program with T-Mobile.

In December, 2017, Numerex was acquired by Sierra Wireless, Inc., a prominent provider of comparable services, in a deal estimated at US$107 million, becoming a wholly owned subsidiary of Sierra.

== Recognition ==
In 2014 and 2015, Numerex was awarded Best Overall Platform by IoT Evolution, as well as Best Security Platform by Compass Intelligence.

In 2015, it was recognized by the Technology Association of Georgia as a Top 40 Innovative Technology Company.

== See also ==
- Retarus
- TASKING
