= Transport industry =

Sector of industry

The transport/transportation and logistics industry is a category of companies that provide services to transport people or goods. The Global Industry Classification Standard (GICS) lists transport below the industrials sector. The sector consists of several industries including logistics and air freight or airlines, marine, road and rail, and their respective infrastructures. Entire stock market indexes focus on the sector, like the Dow Jones Transportation Index (DJTA).

In the EU, the transport industry directly employs around 10 million people and accounts for about 5% of the gross domestic product (GDP). Logistics account for 10–15% of the cost of a finished product for European companies. On average 13.2% of every household's budget is spent on transport, which still depends heavily on fossil fuels and represents an important source of CO_{2} emissions. Emissions from road freight transport have risen by more than 20% since 1995, counterweighting the increased energy efficiency of vehicles.

Logistics and transport as the basis of global trade is worth over 5.7 trillion Euros.

Digitalisation and the expansion of e-commerce are gradually changing the transport and logistics industry. Modern logistics networks are now characterised by real-time tracking, data-oriented route optimisation and cross-border fulfilment to complement traditional freight and passenger services.

== Global players ==
According to Forbes Global 2000, FedEx is the biggest transportation and logistics company in the world in 2021, closely followed by UPS.

In addition to these already existing integrators, e-commerce connected digital logistics networks have disrupted the industry. These networks organise warehousing, shipment tracking, route planning, last-mile delivery, and cross-border fulfilment of high volumes of parcels and enhance efficiency and visibility across supply chains. The digitalisation of global logistics performance indicators, such as real-time shipment, customs processing efficiency, and end-to-end visibility of shipment, reflects the importance of information flows supplementing physical transport flows, with this trend increasingly prominent in performance indicators.

Affiliated logistics networks have also emerged out of e-commerce ecosystems to deal with distribution. A prominent example is the logistics company of the value chain, Cainiao Smart Logistics Network, by Alibaba Group, which offers data-driven package and fulfillment services to its merchants in China and worldwide. Cainiao has organised platform-linked logistics, including cross-border shipping, warehouse management, and last-mile delivery, showing how platform-based logistics can be used to supplement traditional carriers rather than substitute them to the point of defeating them.

Platform-based logistics institutional assessments highlight that these platforms enhance efficiency but exist alongside traditional freight organisations, Post-Express, and national carriers. The physical and digital infrastructural gaps in developing countries restrict the behaviour of e-commerce logistics, influencing the movement of parcels, the clearance of customs, and delivery and transit times. In these aspects, the solution will require enhancement through investment in transport infrastructure and integration of digital tools of logistics .

Global transport has experienced a combination of legacy integrators and specialised logistics providers, as well as platform-linked networks. Collectively, they operate to handle rising volumes of parcels, deliver data-driven solutions about supply chains and facilitate cross-border trade not only of conventional trade but also of e-commerce platforms as well.

== See also ==
- Shipping industry
- Rail industry
- Freight industry
- Occupational safety and health/ transportation
