= Wavecom =

French telecommunications technology company

Wavecom SA
- Industry: telecommunications
- Founded: Issy-les-Moulineaux, France (1993)
- Defunct: 2009
- Fate: Acquired
- Successor: Sierra Wireless
- Headquarters: Issy-les-Moulineaux, France
- Products: telecommunications
- Revenue: € 129.9 million (2008)
- Number of employees: 500 (2008)

Wavecom (acquired by Sierra Wireless in 2009) was a French technology company that developed and manufactured embedded wireless technology for Machine to Machine (M2M) communication, enabling transmission and reception of data and voice communications using wireless cellular network operators. Its technology was used in smart meter solutions, automotive telematics, fleet management systems, wireless alarms, wireless POS devices, fixed cellular terminals and other M2M systems.

== History ==
Wavecom was founded in 1993 by Michel Alard, Aram Hékimian and André Jolivet. In its first three years of existence, Wavecom operated as an engineering consultancy primarily focused on wireless communication. By 1996, the founders realized there was a market for a standard GSM module, which could be integrated into mobile phones and other wireless applications. The first standard module was introduced in January 1997.

Wavecom was acquired by Sierra Wireless in 2009.

== Open AT OS ==
Open AT OS is an operating system provided by Sierra Wireless together with its wireless modules. It natively provides GSM related functions, such as GSM voice calls or data transfer related APIs, in addition to standard operating system functions. On Sierra Wireless modules, the application binary is downloaded beside the GSM function binary and both are executed at the same time on the processor.
