= Sierra Wireless Voq =

2004 smartphone model

VOQ
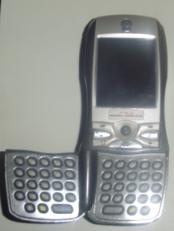
- Manufacturer: Sierra Wireless
- Availability by region: 2004; 22 years ago
- Compatible networks: Tri band GSM; GPRS/EDGE
- Form factor: Smartphone
- Dimensions: 5.25×2.16×.96 in (133×55×24 mm)
- Operating system: Windows Mobile 2003/2003SE
- CPU: Intel 200 MHz XScale PXA262
- Memory: 48 MB Internal Flash memory 32 MB RAM
- Removable storage: SD Card
- Battery: 1200 mAh Li-ion
- Rear camera: No Camera
- Display: 176x220 px 2.2 in color LCD
- Connectivity: USB; 2.5" Headphone jack Infrared
- Data inputs: Keyboard

The Voq Professional Phone is a tri-band Smartphone based on a 200 MHz Intel XScale PXA262 processor with stacked flash memory, running on Microsoft Windows Mobile 2003 edition. Announced on October 8, 2003, the product combines elements of a mobile phone, a personal messaging device, and a PDA with such distinctive features as a flip-open QWERTY thumbpad (in addition to the familiar 12 key dial pad).

== Overview ==
The phone was announced in 2003. Without a carrier, the phone retailed for about $400. Despite being awarded the British Columbia Technology Industries Association (BC TIA) "Excellence in Product Innovation Award" in 2004, Sierra Wireless' entry into the competitive Smartphone market eroded their embedded module sales. On July 7, 2005, Sierra Wireless announced they would be exiting the "Voq Professional Phone initiative".

Models:

- A10 – 900/1800/1900 bands (Europe)
- A11 – 850/1800/1900 bands (North America)

The VOQ shipped with Windows Mobile 2003 version 4.2.0 build 13349 with a radio REV of 03.06

- Operator: 1.6.0.12
- Microsoft: 4.20.13349.0
- Language: 1.6.0.12
- File System: 4.20.13349.0

== Differences in ROM versions ==
- using the above ROM version, the end button will not hide current program, it will be unresponsive. when upgraded to WM2003SE, The end button will hide the current application.
- the start menu button does not have the windows logo. 2003SE has the windows logo next to Start

== Specifications ==
- Weight 5.11 oz. (with battery)
- Tri-Band GSM/EDGE

A10: 900/1800/1900 MHz
A11: 850/1800/1900 MHz

- Processor: Intel Xscale PXA262 @ 200 MHz
- Memory: 64MB of ROM and 32MB of RAM
- Display LCD (Color TFT/TFD: Colors: 64k)
- Display Resolution: 176 x 220 pixels
- Display Size: 2.2"
- Dimensions: 5.25 x 2.16 x .96 inches
- Wireless connectivity: IrDA, GPRS
- Other connectivity: VOQ USB Connection
- Audio Microphone/Speaker: Built In Speaker, hands-free Headphone; MP3/WMA Codec
- QWERTY Keyboard - Flip out
- Smart Media: SD
- Operating system: Windows Mobile 2003, upgradeable to 2003SE
- Battery: 1200 mA·h
- AC Adapter: AC input/frequency: 100 ~ 240 Vac, 50/60 Hz : DC output: 5Vdc and 1A (typical)

== Disassembled ==
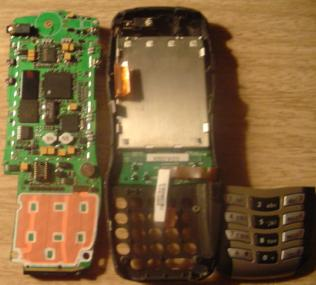
The mainboard side that goes under the keypad

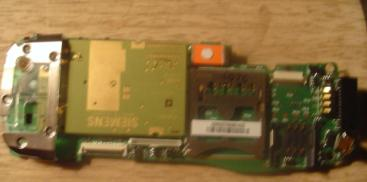
The backside of the mainboard, exposing the SIEMENS GSM Module, and SD Card slot

the USB connector for VOQ phones
