= Retarus =

Retarus GmbH
- Company type: Private
- Founded: 1992
- Founder: Martin Hager
- Headquarters: Munich, Germany
- Number of locations: 16 international offices
- Revenue: 70M€ (2024)
- Number of employees: 450
- Website: https://www.retarus.com/

Retarus GmbH is an international information and communication technology company headquartered in Munich, Germany. Retarus provides cloud-based fax, email security, SMS, EDI and E-Invoicing services for businesses. Its US headquarters is located in Secaucus, NJ.

== History ==
Retarus was founded in 1992 by Martin Hager, who currently serves as the company's president and CEO.

In 1993 and 1994, Retarus introduced hosted fax and email security services, allowing transmission of high volumes of faxes for enterprise customers.

In 1998, Retarus launched a free wake-up call service through www.weckruf.de. It quickly attracted over 135,000 users and reached its millionth call by November that same year. Its popularity has drawn advertisers like Amazon.de, Yellowmap, and Unertl Weißbier, who started using it for wake-up spots, banner ads, and email notifications.

In 2001, it launched SMS services as part of its offering. Retarus started offering cloud messaging services for resellers and channel partners in 2010. In 2015, the company opened data centers in Asia and Australia. In 2019, the company founded a new local subsidiary in Romania. In 2021, a subsidiary was established in Lisbon (Portugal).

In 2022, Retarus partnered with DE-CIX, an operator of carrier- and data-center-neutral Internet Exchanges that allows users of DE-CIX to communicate through Retarus' cloud via a private direct connection that bypasses the public Internet, unlike VPN, Multiprotocol Label Switching or leased lines.

== Other ==
Retarus conducts email research on a regular basis that gets featured in newspapers. For instance, in 2008, Frankfurter Allgemeine Zeitung cited Retarus' findings, reporting that over 98% of emails were spam.

In 2019, Retarus was again cited by Frankfurter Allgemeine Zeitung, which found that fax usage was increasing among DAX-listed enterprises. The number of companies using fax grew by 17% compared to 2018.
