= RTTVP =

Software platform for real-time freight tracking

A real-time transportation visibility platform (RTTVP) is a type of logistics software that provides information about the location and status of orders and freight shipments after they leave a warehouse or other facility. RTTVPs form part of the wider supply chain visibility market and are primarily used in road transportation, although some platforms support other modes.

== Functions ==
RTTVPs obtain information through integrations with carrier systems, application programming interfaces, electronic data interchange, vehicle telematics and mobile applications. Common functions include shipment tracking, delay notifications and the calculation of predicted arrival times using current and historical transportation data.

== Implementation ==
Research has identified information sharing, system connectivity and cooperation among shippers, carriers, freight forwarders and subcontractors as important factors in successful implementation. Implementation may be limited by incomplete integrations, privacy concerns, subcontractor onboarding costs and unequal distribution of costs and benefits among participants.

== See also ==
- Supply chain management
- Transportation management system
- Vehicle tracking system
