= Emergency Warning System =

Emergency emergency broadcast system used in Japan

- Type: Emergency broadcast
- Country: Japan
- First air date: August 30, 2013
- Availability: across Japan

Emergency Warning System (Japanese: 特別警報) is a warning system founded by Japan Meteorological Agency (JMA) and launched on August 30, 2013. Emergency Warnings are issued to alert people to the significant likelihood of catastrophes in association with natural phenomena of extraordinary magnitude. Residents should take all measures possible to protect themselves in the event that an Emergency Warning is issued.

The Emergency Warning Broadcast System (Japan) sends a signal televisions and radios, while J-Alert is used to alert the population by loudspeakers, television, radio, email, and cell broadcasts.

== Overview ==
JMA issues various warnings to alert people to possible catastrophes caused by extraordinary natural phenomena such as heavy rain, earthquakes, tsunami and storm surges. In addition to such warnings, advisories and other bulletins, JMA started issuing Emergency Warnings to alert people to the significant likelihood of catastrophes if phenomena are expected to be of a scale that will far exceed the warning criteria.

Emergency Warnings are intended for extraordinary phenomena such as the major tsunami caused by the 2011 Great East Japan Earthquake by which 18,000 people were killed or left missing, the 1959 storm surge in Ise Bay caused by Typhoon Vera, by which more than 5,000 people were killed or left missing, and the 2011 heavy rain caused by Typhoon Talas, by which around 100 people were killed or left missing.

The issuance of an Emergency Warning for an area indicates a level of exceptional risk of a magnitude observed only once every few decades. Residents should pay attention to their surroundings and relevant information such as municipal evacuation advisories and evacuations, and should take all steps necessary to protect life.

== Relationship between Emergency Warnings and Warnings/Advisories ==
Emergency Warnings are issued if a phenomenon is expected to be of a scale that will far exceed the relevant warning criteria, such as the 2011 Great East Japan Earthquake and Typhoon Vera in 1959.

Emergency Warnings are intended for extraordinary phenomena expected to be of a scale that will far exceed the warning criteria. Warnings and Advisories continue to be issued in their current form even after the introduction of Emergency Warnings.

Residents should not let down their guard even if no Emergency Warning is currently in effect in the area. It is important to take action early wherever possible with reference to relevant weather bulletins, Advisories and Warnings, which are updated in response to the latest phenomenon observations or predictions.

The criteria for Emergency Warning issuance were determined in response to the views of local governments in charge of disaster management for their own areas. In regard to earthquakes, tsunami and volcanic eruptions, JMA maintains the system of warning nomenclature used until August 29, 2013, but issues messages in the new classification of Emergency Warnings for high-risk conditions. These include Major Tsunami Warnings, Volcanic Warnings (Level 4 or more) and Earthquake Early Warnings (incorporating prediction of tremors measuring 6-lower or more on JMA's seismic intensity scale).

== See also ==
- Early warning system
- Emergency communication system
- Emergency population warning broadcasting
