= Severe weather terminology (Japan) =

This article describes the Japan Meteorological Agency (JMA) severe weather terminology. The JMA defines precise meanings for nearly all its weather terms as the Information for Severe Weather Preparation (防災気象情報, Bousai Kishō Jōhō). This article describes JMA terminology and related JMA weather scales. Some terms may be specific to certain regions.

== Warning Categories ==
Severe weather bulletins are issued as an advisory or a warning, depending on the risk or severity of the event. Less severe events that could be a cause for concern will be issued as a bulletin or an advisory.

- Advisories (注意報, Chūihō)
- Warnings (警報, Keihō)
- Emergency Warnings (特別警報, Tokubetsu Keihō)
- Bulletins (気象情報, Kishō Jōhō): provide information to supplement warnings and advisories.

== Meteorological Warnings ==
Weather advisories and warnings are issued when potentially hazardous weather is occurring or is forecast for the short-term period.

=== General Warnings ===
Due to its local-scale nature, an advisory is typically issued in advance for public forecast areas where conditions may be favorable for the development of severe weather. A warning is issued for areas where severe weather is imminent or occurring.

=== Advisories ===
- Advisory for Gale and snow (風雪注意報, Fūsetsu Chūihō)
- Advisory for Gale (強風注意報, Kyōfū Chūihō)
- Advisory for Heavy rain (大雨注意報, Ōame Chūihō)
- Advisory for Heavy snow (大雪注意報, Ōyuki Chūihō)
- Advisory for Dense fog (濃霧注意報, Nōmu Chūihō)
- Advisory for Thunderstorm (雷注意報, Kaminari Chūihō)
- Advisory for Dry air (乾燥注意報, Kansō Chūihō)
- Advisory for Avalanche (なだれ注意報, Nadare Chūihō)
- Advisory for Ice/snow accretion (着氷・着雪注意報, Chakuhyō Chakusetsu Chūihō)
- Advisory for Frost (霜注意報, Shimo Chūihō)
- Advisory for Low temperature (低温注意報, Teion Chūihō)
- Advisory for Snow melting (融雪注意報, Yūsetsu Chūihō)
- Advisory for Storm surge (高潮注意報, Takashio Chūihō)
- Advisory for High waves (波浪注意報, Harō Chūihō)
- Advisory for Flood (洪水注意報, Kōzui Chūihō)
- Advisory for Tornado (竜巻注意報, Tatsumaki Chūihō)

=== Warnings ===
- Warning for Storm (暴風警報, Bōfū Keihō)
- Warning for Snow-storm (暴風雪警報, Bōfūsetsu Keihō)
- Warning for Heavy rain (大雨警報, Ōame Keihō)
- Warning for Heavy snow (大雪警報, Ōyuki Keihō)
- Warning for Storm surge (高潮警報, Takashio Keihō)
- Warning for High waves (波浪警報, Harō Keihō)
- Warning for Flood (洪水警報, Kōzui Keihō)

=== Marine Warnings ===
- Warning for Near Gale (海上風警報, Kaijō Keihō)
- Warning for Gale (海上強風警報, Kaijō Kyōfū Keihō)
- Warning for Storm (海上暴風警報, Kaijō Bōfū Keihō)
- Warning for Typhoon (海上台風警報, Kaijō Taifū Keihō)
- Warning for Dense Fog (海上濃霧警報, Kaijō Nōmu Keihō)
- Warning for Icing (海上着氷警報, Kaijō Chakuhyō Keihō)
- Warning for Sea Swell (海上うねり警報, Kaijō Uneri Keihō)

=== Typhoons or Tropical Depressions ===
- Typhoon Information (台風情報, Taifū Jōhō)

=== Flood Forecasting ===
- Flood Forecasting (洪水予報, Kōzui Yohō)

== Seismological Warnings ==
=== Earthquake Information ===
- Earthquake Information (地震情報, Jishin Jōhō)
  - Seismic Intensity Information (震度速報, Shindo Sokuhō)
  - Earthquake Information (震源に関する情報, Shingen ni Kansuru Jōhō)
  - Earthquake and Seismic Intensity Information (震源・震度に関する情報, Shingen/Shindo ni Kansuru Jōhō)
  - Information on seismic intensity at each site (各地の震度に関する情報, Kakuchi no Shindo ni Kansuru Jōhō)
  - Distant Earthquake Information (遠地地震に関する情報, Enchi Jishin ni Kansuru Jōhō)

==== Earthquake Early Warning ====
- Earthquake Early Warning (緊急地震速報, Kinkyū Jishin Sokuhō)

=== Tsunami Warnings ===
- Tsunami Information (津波情報, Tsunami Jōhō)
  - Tsunami Forecast (津波予報, Tsunami Yohō)
  - Tsunami Advisory (津波注意報, Tsunami Chūihō)
  - Tsunami Warning (津波警報, Tsunami Keihō)

=== Volcano Information ===
- Volcano Information (火山情報, Kazan Jōhō)
  - Volcanic Forecast (噴火予報, Funka Yohō)
  - Volcanic Warning (噴火警報, Funka Keihō)

== See also ==
- List of severe weather phenomena
- Japan Meteorological Agency
- Severe weather terminology (United States)
- Severe weather terminology (Canada)
