= District Meteorological Observatory =

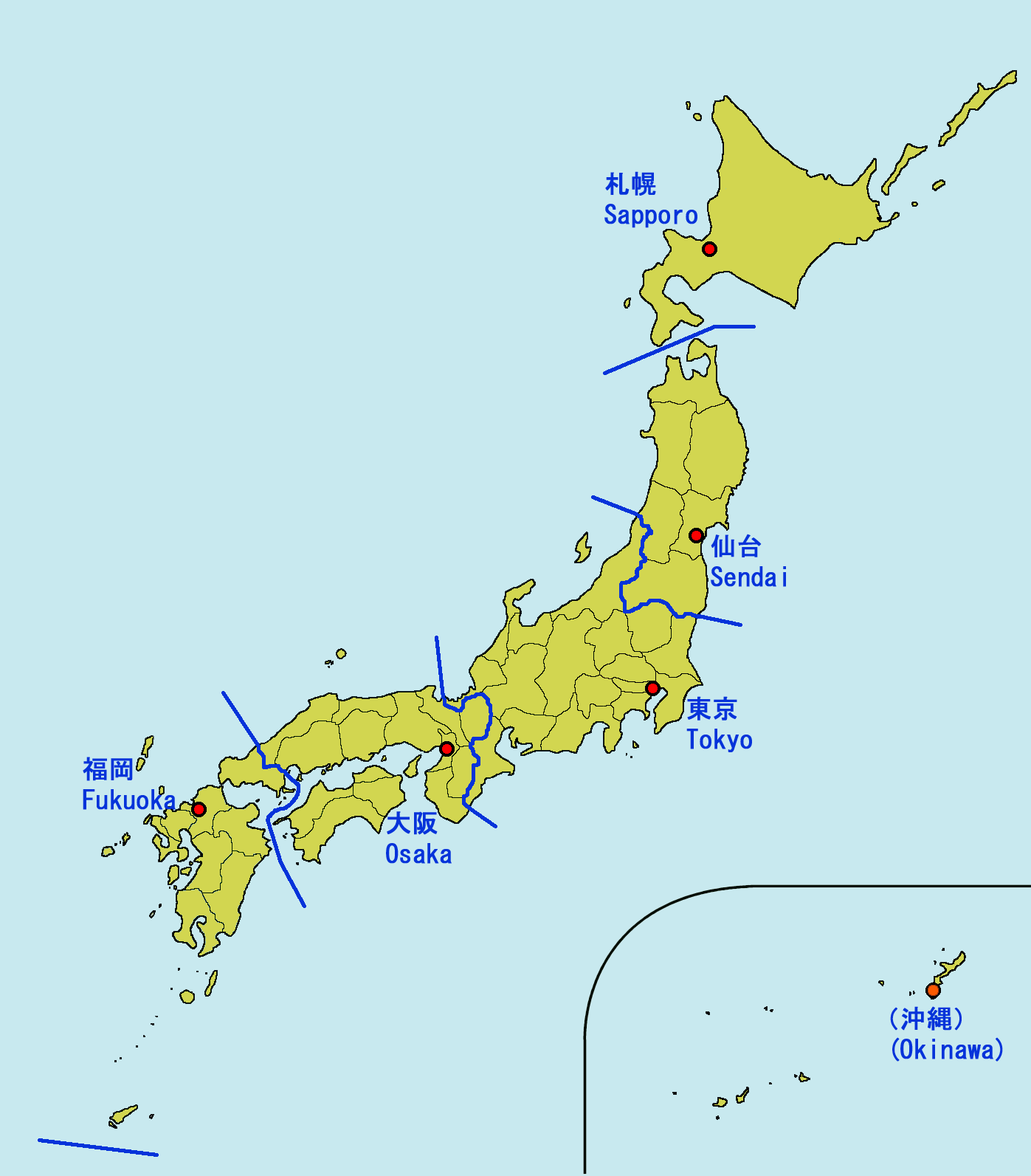
The locations of the District Meteorological Observatories

The District Meteorological Observatory (管区気象台, Kanku Kishōdai), abbreviated to DMO, is a type of Japan Meteorological Agency (JMA) weather station (気象台, Kishōdai) and a part of a local government (地方支分部局, Chihō Shibun Bukyoku). There are five District Meteorological Observatories in Japan. They are responsible for regional observation of the atmosphere, earthquakes, volcanos, and gathering data to make public service announcements and provide warnings in the event of a natural disaster. They also supervise Local Meteorological Observatories (地方気象台, Chihō Kishōdai) and other weather stations within each district area.

== District Meteorological Observatories in Japan ==
- Sapporo District Meteorological Observatory (札幌管区気象台, Sapporo Kanku Kishōdai)

Covering area: Hokkaido

- Sendai District Meteorological Observatory (仙台管区気象台, Sendai Kanku Kishōdai)

Covering area: Tōhoku region

- Tokyo District Meteorological Observatory (東京管区気象台, Tōkyō Kanku Kishōdai)

Covering area: Kantō and Chūbu region

- Osaka District Meteorological Observatory (大阪管区気象台, Ōsaka Kanku Kishōdai)

Covering area: Kinki, Chūgoku (except for Yamaguchi Prefecture) and Shikoku region

- Fukuoka District Meteorological Observatory (福岡管区気象台, Fukuoka Kanku Kishōdai)

Covering area: Yamaguchi Prefecture and Kyushu region except for Okinawa Prefecture

In addition to the above weather observatories, Okinawa Meteorological Observatory (沖縄気象台, Okinawa Kishōdai) is considered to be equivalent to them in a status owing to the wideness of its district area, which is covering largely in the ocean. This particular position is provided by Article XLVIII, Section 2 of the Act for Establishment of the Ministry of Land, Infrastructure, Transport and Tourism (国土交通省設置法, Kokudo Kōtsūsho Secchihō).
