= Tropical cyclone warnings and watches =

Levels of alert issued to areas threatened by a tropical cyclone

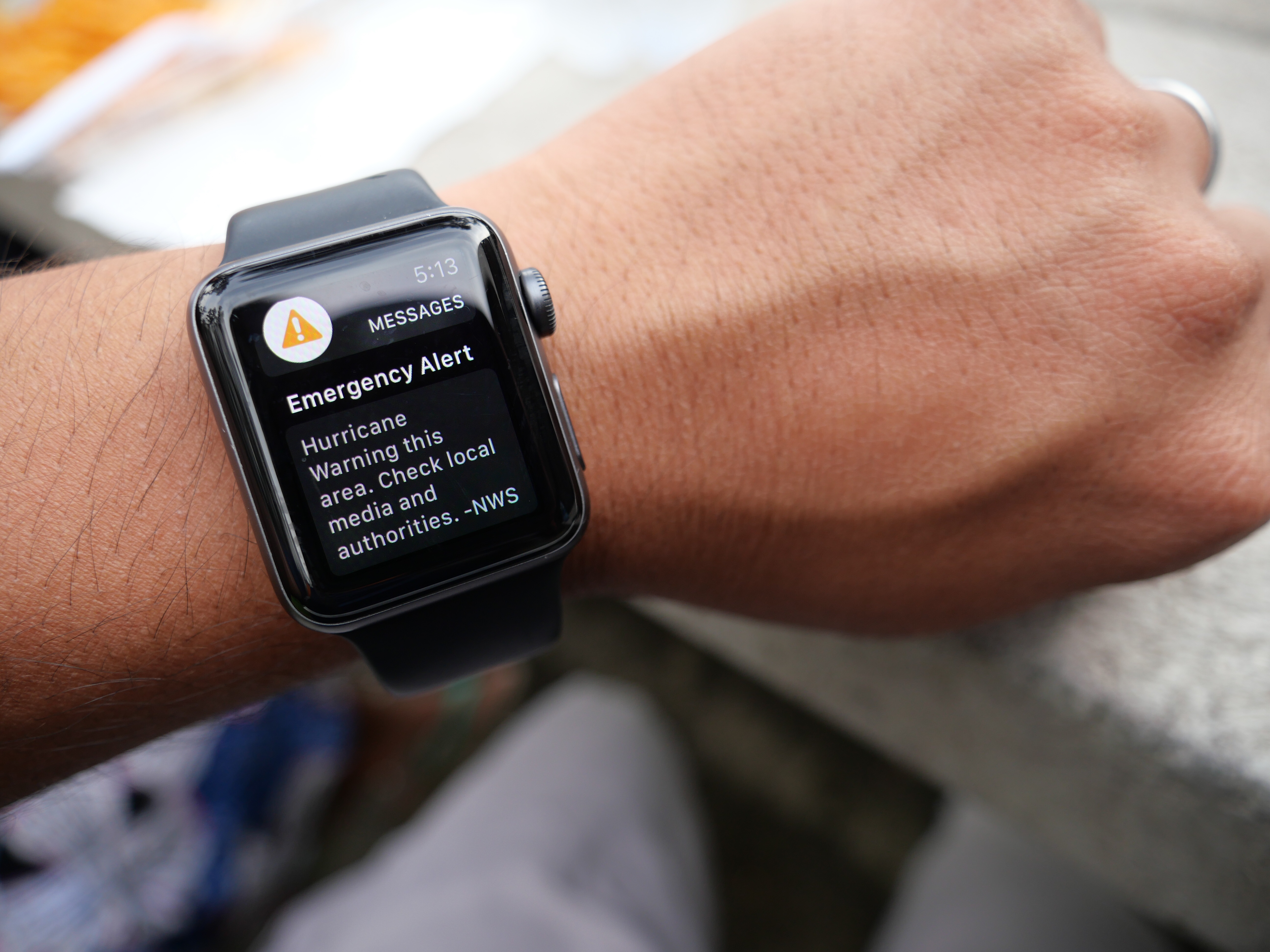
Alert issued for Hawaii about a hurricane warning during Hurricane Lane in 2018

Tropical cyclone warnings and watches are alerts issued by national weather forecasting bodies to coastal areas threatened by the imminent approach of a tropical cyclone of tropical storm or hurricane intensity. They are notices to the local population and civil authorities to make appropriate preparation for the cyclone, including evacuation of vulnerable areas where necessary. It is important that interests throughout the area of an alert make preparations to protect life and property, and do not disregard it on the strength of the detailed forecast track.

== Western Hemisphere ==
New tropical cyclone position and forecast information is available at least every twelve hours in the Southern Hemisphere and at least every six hours in the Northern Hemisphere from Regional Specialized Meteorological Centers and Tropical Cyclone Warning Centers. In conjunction with the National Hurricane Center, the national meteorological and hydrological services of Central America, the northern Atlantic Ocean, and the northeastern Pacific Ocean east of the 140th meridian west, excluding mainland Africa and Europe, all issue tropical storm/hurricane watches and warnings. Tropical storm watches are issued when gale and storm force winds of between 34 and 63 kn (39 and 72 mph; 63 and 117 km/h) are possible, within 48 hours in a specified area in association with a tropical, subtropical or post-tropical cyclone. These watches are upgraded to tropical storm warnings, when gale and storm force winds become expected to occur somewhere in the warning area within 36 hours. Hurricane watches are issued when sustained winds of 64 knots (74 mph; 119 km/h) are possible, within 48 hours in a specified area in association with a tropical, subtropical or post-tropical cyclone. These watches are upgraded to hurricane warnings, when hurricane-force winds become expected to occur somewhere in the warning area within 36 hours.

Because hurricane preparedness activities become difficult once winds reach tropical storm force, the hurricane watch and warnings are issued in advance of the anticipated onset of tropical-storm-force winds, rather than in advance of the anticipated onset of hurricane-force winds. At times a tropical storm warning and a hurricane watch can both be in effect due to uncertainties in the forecast. These watches and warnings are also issued by the Central Pacific Hurricane Center for the Hawaiian Islands and the Weather Forecast Office in Guam for parts of Micronesia but not for American Samoa due to an international agreement.

Within the United States, an extreme wind warning is issued by the National Weather Service for any land areas that are expected to be impacted by a major hurricane (Category 3 or higher) and by sustained surface winds greater than or equal to 100 kn (120 mph; 190 km/h). The warning is issued just prior to when the strongest winds of the eyewall are expected to impact an area. The warning is to be issued for the smallest area possible, and be valid for times of two hours or less. It was developed in response to confusion resulting from the landfall of Hurricane Katrina. NWS offices in Jackson and New Orleans/Baton Rouge issued 11 tornado warnings for areas that would not experience an actual tornado, but would experience extreme wind speeds commonly associated with tornadoes. The extreme wind warning is now expected to be used in these situations.

In 2017, the National Hurricane Center introduced a new system of warnings and watches for storm surge, which would cover the Atlantic and Gulf Coasts of the United States. A storm surge watch would be issued when a life-threatening storm surge, associated with a potential or ongoing tropical, subtropical or post-tropical cyclone, is possible within the next 48 hours. These watches would be upgraded to storm surge warnings when there is a danger of life-threatening storm surge occurring within 36 hours. However, both watches and warnings may be issued earlier than specified if environmental conditions are expected to hamper preparations.

In Mexico, a color coded alert system is used to keep the public informed when a tropical cyclone or possible tropical cyclones poses a threat to the nation. The scale starts with blue at the bottom being minimal danger, then proceeds to a green alert, which means low level danger. A yellow alert signifies moderate danger, followed by an orange alert that means high danger level. The scale tops off with a red alert, the maximum level of danger.

=== Canada ===
In Canada, terminology is fairly similar to that of the United States, but there are a few differences:

- Watches are issued 36 hours prior to a tropical cyclone making landfall.
- Warnings are issued 24 hours prior to the tropical cyclone making landfall.
- If sustained winds 70 km/h and/or gusts 90 km/h or stronger are predicted, a conventional wind warning will be issued along with the tropical cyclone watches and warnings.
- A storm surge warning may be issued if abnormally high water levels are predicted.

== Western Pacific basin ==
=== China ===
A two-stage warning system was long-established in China for tropical cyclones of tropical storm intensity of above. Nowadays, the use of this system is restricted to coastal waters only. Thus, warnings may be discontinued even if a cyclone is maintaining tropical storm intensity inland. Color-coded alerts (below) may be in effect independently of any two-stage warnings.

Later, China Meteorological Administration standardized the system for national use. This set is part of a larger warning system that covers other forms of severe weather conditions, such as extreme temperature, torrential rainfall, drought, etc.

Level	Name	Sign	Meaning
IV	Blue typhoon alert 台风蓝色预警信号		Within 24 hours, it may or may have been affected by tropical cyclones. The average wind power on the coast or land is above 6, or the gust above 8 and may continue.
III	Yellow typhoon alert 台风黄色预警信号		Within 24 hours, it may or may have been affected by tropical cyclones. The average wind power on the coast or land is above 8, or the gust above 10 and may continue.
II	Orange typhoon alert 台风橙色预警信号		Within 12 hours, it may or may have been affected by tropical cyclones. The average wind power on the coast or land is above 10, or the gust above 12 and may continue.
I	Red typhoon alert 台风红色预警信号		Within 6 hours, it may or may have been affected by tropical cyclones. The average wind power on the coast or land is above 12, or the gust above 14 and may continue.

==== Guangdong ====
Guangdong continued to set up the White typhoon alert for typhoon, indicating that tropical cyclones may affect the area within 48 hours. In some inland areas that are less affected by tropical cyclones (such as Qinghai, etc.), there is no typhoon warning signal, but when it is hit by tropical cyclones, a strong wind warning signal will be issued. The winds represented by each color are consistent with the typhoon warning signal.

Typhoon warning signals used in Guangzhou from June 1, 1995, to November 1, 2000:

Name	Meaning
Windproof Info (Tropical Storm or Typhoon Info)	indicates that a tropical storm or typhoon has entered the South China Sea (or has formed in the South China Sea) and is likely to move to the coastal areas of the province.
Windproof Warning (Tropical Storm and Typhoon Warning)	Indicating that a tropical storm or typhoon warning enters the South China Sea, its route is moving in the direction of the Pearl River Estuary. If there is no change, it may land within 48 hours.
Windproof Special Alert (Tropical Storm or Typhoon Emergency Alert)	Indicating that a tropical storm or typhoon hits the Pearl River Estuary within 24 hours, or landed in a coastal area within 150 kilometers of the Pearl River Estuary, which will have a serious impact on Guangzhou.
Disarming (Tropical Storm or Typhoon Disarming Alert)	indicates that a tropical storm or typhoon has landed (or weakened to a low pressure).

Typhoon warning signals used from November 1, 2000, to May 2006:

Name	Signal	Meaning
White typhoon alert		Tropical cyclones may affect the area within 48 hours.
Green typhoon alert		Tropical cyclones will be within 24 hours or are affecting the area, with an average wind level of strong winds (6–7) (41-62 km/h).
Yellow typhoon alert		Tropical cyclones will be within 12 hours or are affecting the area, with an average winds level of strong gale (8–9) (63-87 km/h).
Red typhoon alert		Tropical cyclones will be within 12 hours or are affecting the area, with an average winds level of strong storm (10–11) (88-117 km/h).
Black typhoon alert		Tropical cyclones will be within 12 hours or are affecting the area, with an average winds level of typhoon (>12).

Typhoon warning signals used from June 1, 2006, to December 31, 2014:

Name	Signal	Meaning
White typhoon alert		Tropical cyclones may affect the area within 48 hours.
Blue typhoon alert		It may be affected by tropical cyclones within 24 hours, the average wind power can reach above level 6, or gusts above 7; or it has been affected by tropical cyclones with an average wind power of 6–7, or gusts of 7–8, and may continue.
Yellow typhoon alert		It may be affected by tropical cyclones within 24 hours, the average wind power can reach above level 8, or gusts above 9; or it has been affected by tropical cyclones with an average wind power of 8–9, or gusts of 9–10, and may continue.
Orange typhoon alert		It may be affected by tropical cyclones within 12 hours, the average wind power can reach above level 10, or gusts above 11; or it has been affected by tropical cyclones with an average wind power of 10–11, or gusts of 11–12, and may continue.
Red typhoon alert		It may be affected by tropical cyclones within 6 hours, the average wind power can reach above level 12; or it has been affected by tropical cyclones with an average wind power of 12, and may continue.

Typhoon warning signals used since January 1, 2015:

Name	Signal	Meaning
White typhoon alert	2015版广东省突发气象灾害预警信号之台风预警信号	Tropical cyclones may affect the area within 48 hours.
Blue typhoon alert	2015版广东省突发气象灾害预警信号之台风预警信号	It may be affected by tropical cyclones within 24 hours, the average wind power can reach above level 6, or gusts above 7; or it has been affected by tropical cyclones with an average wind power of 6–7, or gusts of 7–8, and may continue.
Yellow typhoon alert	2015版广东省突发气象灾害预警信号之台风预警信号	It may be affected by tropical cyclones within 24 hours, the average wind power can reach above level 8, or gusts above 9; or it has been affected by tropical cyclones with an average wind power of 8–9, or gusts of 9–10, and may continue.
Orange typhoon alert	2015版广东省突发气象灾害预警信号之台风预警信号	It may be affected by tropical cyclones within 12 hours, the average wind power can reach above level 10, or gusts above 11; or it has been affected by tropical cyclones with an average wind power of 10–11, or gusts of 11–12, and may continue.
Red typhoon alert	2015版广东省突发气象灾害预警信号之台风预警信号	It may be affected by tropical cyclones within 6 hours, the average wind power can reach above level 12; or it has been affected by tropical cyclones with an average wind power of 12, and may continue.

===== Shenzhen =====
Shenzhen currently uses a different signal from Guangdong Province:

===== Zhuhai =====
Zhuhai adopts the signal style of Guangdong Province, but the meaning of the signal is different:

==== Ball signal ====
===== Shenzhen and Zhuhai =====
Shenzhen and Zhuhai used digitally arranged typhoon signals from June 4, 1994, to November 1, 2000, but they have now been replaced by typhoon warning signals.

===== Ports =====
The coastal ports of various cities in mainland China will still hang the squash signal when the typhoon hits. The sign is roughly the same as the typhoon signal used in Shenzhen and Zhuhai.

=== Hong Kong and Macau ===
The Pearl River Delta uses a variety of warning systems to inform the public regarding the risks of tropical cyclones to the area.

The Hong Kong Observatory issues typhoon signals to indicate the existence and effects of a tropical cyclone on Hong Kong. The first numeric warning system was used in 1917.

The Macao Meteorological and Geophysical Bureau in Macau uses a similar system.

In Hong Kong the typhoon signal system consists of 8 signals in 5 levels numbered non-consecutively for historical reasons. Each signal has a day signal and a night signal for hoisting, which are still hoisted in Macau but no longer hoisted in Hong Kong. Day signals are also used as signal symbols in both places.

Signal	Symbol in Hong Kong	Symbol in Macau	Night Signal in Macau	Note	Wind speed	Gust
No.1				(Standby) A tropical cyclone is centred within 800 km of the territory.	NA	NA
No.3				A definite warning that a tropical cyclone is expected to come near enough to Hong Kong to cause strong winds in Hong Kong. It normally gives 12 hours warning of strong winds generally over Hong Kong at sea level, but in exposed areas, winds may become strong sooner. Implication for citizens: Do not need to go to kindergartens, some places and events.	Strong wind with a sustained speed of 41–62 km/h	≥ 110 km/h
No.8. NW				Gale or storm force wind. 4 different symbols for different directions. Implication for citizens: Usually no need to go to school or work for most people if hosted before a certain hours before official work hours; depends on official announcement & employment contracts.	Sustained speed of 63–117 km/h from the northwest, southwest, northeast, southeast quadrants respectively	≥ 180 km/h.
No.8. SW				Gale or storm force wind. 4 different symbols for different directions. Implication for citizens: Usually no need to go to school or work for most people if hosted before a certain hours before official work hours; depends on official announcement & employment contracts.	Sustained speed of 63–117 km/h from the northwest, southwest, northeast, southeast quadrants respectively	≥ 180 km/h.
No.8. NE				Gale or storm force wind. 4 different symbols for different directions. Implication for citizens: Usually no need to go to school or work for most people if hosted before a certain hours before official work hours; depends on official announcement & employment contracts.	Sustained speed of 63–117 km/h from the northwest, southwest, northeast, southeast quadrants respectively	≥ 180 km/h.
No.8. SE				Gale or storm force wind. 4 different symbols for different directions. Implication for citizens: Usually no need to go to school or work for most people if hosted before a certain hours before official work hours; depends on official announcement & employment contracts.	Sustained speed of 63–117 km/h from the northwest, southwest, northeast, southeast quadrants respectively	≥ 180 km/h.
No. 9				(Hong Kong) Gale or storm force wind is increasing or expected to increase significantly in strength. / (Macau) The centre of a tropical cyclone is approaching and Macau is expected to be severely affected.	It usually implies that wind speeds are expected to reach 88 to 117 kilometres per hour.	
No. 10				Hurricane-force wind. Implication for citizens: No need to go to work or school. Most public transportation stops.	Winds range upwards from 118 kilometres per hour.	≥ 220 km/h

=== Japan ===
The Japan Meteorological Agency (JMA) is the government agency responsible for gathering and providing results for the public in Japan, that are obtained from data based on daily scientific observation and research into natural phenomena in the fields of meteorology, hydrology, seismology and volcanology, among other related scientific fields. Its headquarters is located in Tokyo.

JMA is also designated one of the Regional Specialized Meteorological Centers (RSMC) of the World Meteorological Organization. It has the responsibility for weather forecasting, tropical cyclone naming and distribution of warnings for tropical cyclones in the Northwestern Pacific region.

=== Philippines ===
PAGASA's Tropical Cyclone Wind Signals (TCWS)
Warning Signal	Meaning
TCWS #1	winds of 39–61 km/h (21–33 kn; 24–38 mph) are prevailing or expected to occur within 36 hours
TCWS #2	winds of 62–88 km/h (33–48 kn; 39–55 mph) are prevailing or expected to occur within 24 hours
TCWS #3	winds of 89–117 km/h (48–63 kn; 55–73 mph) are prevailing or expected to occur within 18 hours
TCWS #4	winds of 118–184 km/h (64–99 kn; 73–114 mph) are prevailing or expected to occur within 12 hours
TCWS #5	winds of 185 km/h (100 kn; 115 mph) or greater are prevailing or expected to occur within 12 hours

The Philippine Atmospheric, Geophysical and Astronomical Services Administration (PAGASA) releases tropical cyclone warnings in the form of Tropical Cyclone Wind Signals (TCWS, or "wind signals"). Within this warning system, an area having a wind signal may be under:

- TCWS #1 - Tropical cyclone winds of 39–61 km/h are prevailing or expected within the next 36 hours.
- TCWS #2 - Tropical cyclone winds of 62–88 km/h are prevailing or expected within the next 24 hours.
- TCWS #3 - Tropical cyclone winds of 89–117 km/h are prevailing or expected within the next 18 hours.
- TCWS #4 - Tropical cyclone winds of 118–184 km/h are prevailing or expected within 12 hours.
- TCWS #5 - Tropical cyclone winds of 185 km/h or greater are prevailing or expected within 12 hours.

These wind signals are hoisted when an area (in the Philippines only) is about to be directly affected by tropical cyclone winds. Wind signals for specific areas can be escalated to higher signal levels (and the lead times shortened consequently) as a tropical cyclone gains strength and/or gets closer to the areas about to be affected. De-escalation and/or lifting of wind signals are implemented once a tropical cyclone weakens and/or gets farther away from the affected areas. The lead time is also only valid for the first issuance.

=== Vietnam ===
Vietnam recognises its typhoon season from the beginning of June through to the end of November, with an average of four to six typhoons hitting the country annually. Any tropical cyclones here are monitored by the National Center for Hydro-Meteorological Forecasting (NCHMF), which is the nation's official meteorological agency and was established in January 2003. The NCHMF tracks a storm should it enter the agency's monitoring area range which is within the East Sea to the west of 120°E and north of 5°N. Any storm that enters this area is assigned a number, and is set according to its sequence of its occurrence – as for instance with Bão số 1 etc., which translates to "Storm no. 1". Bão comes from "暴', meaning ferocious, violent or vicious, but in vernacular Vietnamese has come to mean "storm".

In 2014, the Vietnamese government issued Decree no.44/2014, introduced five warning levels, (Note: Vietnamese: Cấp độ rủi ro thiên tai, lit. 'Disaster risk level') but NCHMF only use three out of five levels to issue typhoon warnings:

- Orange-decorated "Level 3 disaster risk alert" (High alert)
- Red-decorated "Level 4 disaster risk alert" (Very high alert)
- Pink-decorated "Level 5 disaster risk alert" (Disaster alert)

== South Pacific basin ==
The Australian Bureau of Meteorology will issue a cyclone watch for a specified part of Australia, when a tropical cyclone is expected to cause gale-force winds in excess of 62 km/h (40 mph) within 24–48 hours and subsequently make landfall. A cyclone warning is subsequently issued for a specified part of Australia when a tropical cyclone, is expected to cause or is causing gale-force winds in excess of 62 km/h (40 mph) within 24 hours and is subsequently expected to make landfall.

The Fiji Meteorological Service (FMS) issues a tropical cyclone alert for the Cook Islands, Fiji, Kiribati, Nauru, Niue, Tokelau and Tuvalu, when a tropical cyclone has a significant probability of causing gale-force winds or stronger winds within 24–48 hours. Gale, storm and hurricane-force wind warnings are subsequently issued for the above areas by FMS, when a tropical cyclone is either causing or expected to cause either gale storm or hurricane-force winds within 24 hours.

Météo-France is responsible for the issuance of tropical cyclone watches and warnings for New Caledonia, Wallis and Futuna, French Polynesia and the Pitcairn Islands. The National Meteorological and Hydrological Services of the Solomon Islands, Samoa, Indonesia, Papua New Guinea, Tonga, New Zealand, Vanuatu, Timor Leste and American Samoa are responsible for their own watches and warnings.

== Indian Ocean systems ==
The Indian Meteorological Department (IMD/RSMC New Delhi) is responsible for tracking tropical cyclones within the North Indian Ocean. Météo-France in Réunion (MFR/RSMC La Réunion) is responsible for the issuing advisories and tracking of tropical cyclones in the southwest part of the basin, however, the naming of systems is deferred to the Mauritius and Madagascar weather services.

=== India ===
The IMD issues warnings in four stages for the Indian coast.

- Stage 1: Cyclone watch - Issued 72 hours in advance, it discusses the likelihood of development of a cyclonic disturbance in the north Indian Ocean and the coastal region likely to experience adverse weather.
- Stage 2: Cyclone alert - Issued 48 hours in advance of the commencement of adverse weather over the coastal areas.
- Stage 3: Cyclone warning - Issued 24 hours in advance of the commencement of adverse weather over the coastal areas. The location of landfall is discussed at this stage.
- Stage 4: Landfall outlook - Issued 12 hours in advance of the commencement of adverse weather over the coastal areas. The track of the cyclone after the landfall and the possible impact inland is discussed at this stage.

Cyclonic storm conditions mean what winds in excess of 63 km/h (39 mph) are possible.

=== Mauritius ===
Mauritius Meteorological Services is responsible for naming tropical systems in the South-West Indian Ocean between 55°E and 90°E. They issue four different levels of cyclone warnings for the islands of Mauritius and Rodrigues.

- Class I cyclone warnings are issued 36 to 48 hours before the islands are affected by wind gusts of at least 120 km/h (75 mph).
- Class II cyclone warnings are issued when there are 12 hours of daylight left before gusts of 120 km/h (75 mph) affect the islands.
- Class III cyclone warnings are issued when there are 6 hours of daylight left before gusts of 120 km/h (75 mph) affect the islands.
- Class IV cyclone warnings are issued when gusts of at least 120 km/h (75 mph) are occurring in the islands.
- Safety Bulletin Issued for the purpose of: lifting the cyclone warning class III or cyclone warning class IV, as the case may be; and informing the public of the existence of any severe weather conditions associated with the cyclone and other environment risk, depending on the nature and extent of the damage occurred during the passage of the cyclone.
- Termination Issued when subsequent observations indicate that the risk of cyclonic gusts of 120 kilometres per hour has abated and the cyclone is moving away

=== Réunion ===
Météo-France issues five levels of alerts for the French overseas department and region of Réunion.

- Pre-alert/Yellow alert – issued when a tropical system may impact Réunion between 24 and 72 hours.
- Orange alert – issued when a tropical storm or cyclone may impact Réunion in the next 24 hours.
- Red alert – issued when a tropical storm or cyclone is impacting part or all of Réunion.
- Purple alert – issued when a major tropical cyclone with winds exceeding 200 km/h (120 mph) is impacting part or all of Réunion.
- Safeguard phase – issued when a tropical storm or cyclone is moving away from Réunion, but hazards relating to damage caused by the system, such as fallen trees, flooded roads, mudslides, and downed power lines, still remain.

== Military advisories ==
=== HURCON/TCCOR ===
The United States Department of Defense uses a multi-stage system called the Hurricane Condition (HURCON) in the North Atlantic and the Northeast Pacific and the Tropical Cyclone Condition of Readiness (TCCOR) in the western Pacific to prepare bases and evacuate assets and personnel in advance of adverse weather associated with tropical cyclones.

The alerts are recommended by weather facilities either on base or by central sites like the National Hurricane Center or the Joint Typhoon Warning Center and are generally related to the timing and potential for destructive sustained windspeeds of above 50 kn (58 mph; 93 km/h). Recommendations are then considered by base or area commanders along with other subjective factors for setting the alert status like assets, holidays or the bases experience in emergency preparedness. The bases prefer to set these alerts sequentially, from HURCON or TCCOR 5 with destructive winds expected within 96 hours, through levels 4, 3, 2 and if needed to a series of four different level 1 conditions, however depending on the cyclone's movement or location some of these signals can be skipped. After a system passes and stops affecting the base, the authorities can decide to revert to the lowest level or stay in a heightened approach if another tropical cyclone is approaching.

== See also ==
- Gale warning
- HURCON
- Severe weather terminology (disambiguation)
- Small craft advisory
- Storm warning
