= Local Meteorological Observatory =

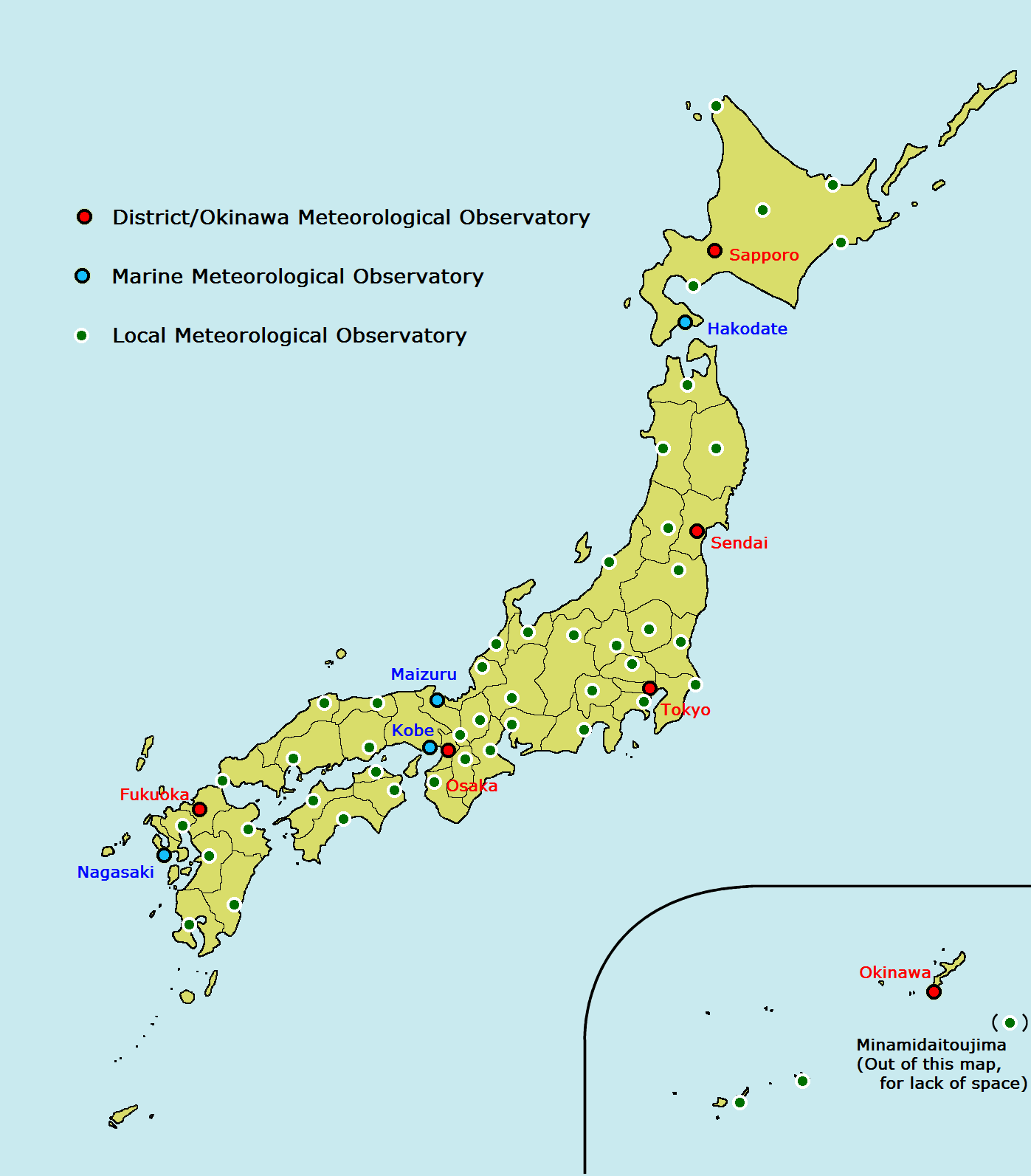
Locations of the JMA Meteorological Observatories including the LMOs

The Local Meteorological Observatory (地方気象台, Chihō Kishōdai), abbreviated to the LMO, is a type of Japan Meteorological Agency (JMA) weather station (気象台, Kishōdai) and a part of its local offices (地方支分部局, Chihō Shibun Bukyoku). JMA set up five LMOs in Hokkaido, three in Okinawa and one in another each prefecture which has neither District Meteorological Observatory (管区気象台, Kanku Kishōdai) nor Marine Observatory (海洋気象台, Kaiyō Kishōdai); thus Local Meteorological Observatories count 50 in Japan. They are responsible for local weather services and some of them manage local weather station (測候所, Sokkōjo)s.

On the one hand, by way of exception, although Maizuru Marine Observatory is in Kyoto Prefecture, it's just for the Sea of Japan basin; Instead, Kyoto Local Meteorological Observatory takes over general weather services within the prefecture. On the other hand, Kobe Marine Observatory administers both marine weather affairs and general weather services in Hyogo Prefecture, and Nagasaki Marine Observatory is the same position as the Kobe's.

== Local Meteorological Observatories in Japan ==
- Sapporo District Meteorological Observatory (札幌管区気象台, Sapporo Kanku Kishōdai) - Hokkaido Region Central Forecast Office (北海道地方予報中枢官署, Hokkaido Chihō Yohō Chūsū Kansho)
  - Wakkanai Local Meteorological Observatory (稚内地方気象台, Wakkanai Chihō Kishōdai)
  - Abashiri Local Meteorological Observatory (網走地方気象台, Abashiri Chihō Kishōdai)
  - Asahikawa Local Meteorological Observatory (旭川地方気象台, Asahikawa Chihō Kishōdai)
  - Hakodate Local Meteorological Observatory (函館地方気象台, Hakodate Chihō Kishōdai)
  - Muroran Local Meteorological Observatory (室蘭地方気象台, Muroran Chihō Kishōdai)
  - Kushiro Local Meteorological Observatory (釧路地方気象台, Kushiro Chihō Kishōdai)
- Sendai District Meteorological Observatory (仙台管区気象台, Sendai Kanku Kishōdai) - Tōhoku Region Central Forecast Office (東北地方予報中枢官署, Tōhoku Chihō Yohō Chūsū Kansho)
  - Aomori Local Meteorological Observatory (青森地方気象台, Aomori Chihō Kishōdai)
  - Akita Local Meteorological Observatory (秋田地方気象台, Akita Chihō Kishōdai)
  - Iwate Local Meteorological Observatory (岩手地方気象台, Iwate Chihō Kishōdai)
  - Yamagata Local Meteorological Observatory (山形地方気象台, Yamagata Chihō Kishōdai)
  - Fukushima Local Meteorological Observatory (福島地方気象台, Fukushima Chihō Kishōdai)
- Tokyo District Meteorological Observatory (東京管区気象台, Tōkyō Kanku Kishōdai) - Kantō Region Central Forecast Office (関東地方予報中枢官署, Kantō Chihō Yohō Chūsū Kansho)
  - Mito Local Meteorological Observatory (水戸地方気象台, Mito Chihō Kishōdai)
  - Utsunomiya Local Meteorological Observatory (宇都宮地方気象台, Utsunomiya Chihō Kishōdai)
  - Maebashi Local Meteorological Observatory (前橋地方気象台, Maebashi Chihō Kishōdai)
  - Kumagaya Local Meteorological Observatory (熊谷地方気象台, Kumagaya Chihō Kishōdai)
  - Chōshi Local Meteorological Observatory (銚子地方気象台, Chōshi Chihō Kishōdai)
  - Yokohama Local Meteorological Observatory (横浜地方気象台, Yokohama Chihō Kishōdai)
  - Kōfu Local Meteorological Observatory (甲府地方気象台, Kōfu Chihō Kishōdai)
  - Nagano Local Meteorological Observatory (長野地方気象台, Nagano Chihō Kishōdai)
  - Niigata Local Meteorological Observatory (新潟地方気象台, Niigata Chihō Kishōdai) - Hokuriku Region Central Forecast Office (北陸地方予報中枢官署, Hokuriku Chihō Yohō Chūsū Kansho)
  - Toyama Local Meteorological Observatory (富山地方気象台, Toyama Chihō Kishōdai)
  - Kanazawa Local Meteorological Observatory (金沢地方気象台, Kanazawa Chihō Kishōdai)
  - Fukui Local Meteorological Observatory (福井地方気象台, Fukui Chihō Kishōdai)
  - Nagoya Local Meteorological Observatory (名古屋地方気象台, Nagoya Chihō Kishōdai) - Tōkai Region Central Forecast Office (東海地方予報中枢官署, Tōkai Chihō Yohō Chūsū Kansho)
  - Gifu Local Meteorological Observatory (岐阜地方気象台, Gifu Chihō Kishōdai)
  - Shizuoka Local Meteorological Observatory (静岡地方気象台, Shizuoka Chihō Kishōdai)
  - Tsu Local Meteorological Observatory (津地方気象台, Tsu Chihō Kishōdai)
- Osaka District Meteorological Observatory (大阪管区気象台, Ōsaka Kanku Kishōdai) - Kinki Region Central Forecast Office (近畿地方予報中枢官署, Kinki Chihō Yohō Chūsū Kansho)
  - Hikone Local Meteorological Observatory (彦根地方気象台, Hikone Chihō Kishōdai)
  - Kobe Local Meteorological Observatory (神戸地方気象台, Kōbe Chihō Kishōdai)
  - Kyoto Local Meteorological Observatory (京都地方気象台, Kyoto Chihō Kishōdai)
  - Nara Local Meteorological Observatory (奈良地方気象台, Nara Chihō Kishōdai)
  - Wakayama Local Meteorological Observatory (和歌山地方気象台, Wakayama Chihō Kishōdai)
  - Hiroshima Local Meteorological Observatory (広島地方気象台, Hiroshima Chihō Kishōdai) - Chūgoku Region Central Forecast Office (中国地方予報中枢官署, Chūgoku Chihō Yohō Chūsū Kansho)
  - Tottori Local Meteorological Observatory (鳥取地方気象台, Tottori Chihō Kishōdai)
  - Matsue Local Meteorological Observatory (松江地方気象台, Matsue Chihō Kishōdai)
  - Okayama Local Meteorological Observatory (岡山地方気象台, Okayama Chihō Kishōdai)
  - Takamatsu Local Meteorological Observatory (高松地方気象台, Takamatsu Chihō Kishōdai) - Shikoku Region Central Forecast Office (四国地方予報中枢官署, Shikoku Chihō Yohō Chūsū Kansho)
  - Matsuyama Local Meteorological Observatory (松山地方気象台, Matsuyama Chihō Kishōdai)
  - Tokushima Local Meteorological Observatory (徳島地方気象台, Tokushima Chihō Kishōdai)
  - Kōchi Local Meteorological Observatory (高知地方気象台, Kōchi Chihō Kishōdai)
- Fukuoka District Meteorological Observatory (福岡管区気象台, Fukuoka Kanku Kishōdai) - Northern Kyushu Region Central Forecast Office (九州北部地方予報中枢官署, Kyushu Hokubu Chihō Yohō Chūsū Kansho)
  - Shimonoseki Local Meteorological Observatory (下関地方気象台, Shimonoseki Chihō Kishōdai)
  - Saga Local Meteorological Observatory (佐賀地方気象台, Saga Chihō Kishōdai)
  - Nagasaki Local Meteorological Observatory (長崎地方気象台, Nagasaki Chihō Kishōdai)
  - Kumamoto Local Meteorological Observatory (熊本地方気象台, Kumamoto Chihō Kishōdai)
  - Ōita Local Meteorological Observatory (大分地方気象台, Ōita Chihō Kishōdai)
  - Kagoshima Local Meteorological Observatory (鹿児島地方気象台, Kagoshima Chihō Kishōdai) - Southern Kyushu Region Central Forecast Office (九州南部地方予報中枢官署, Kyushu Nambu Chihō Yohō Chūsū Kansho)
  - Miyazaki Local Meteorological Observatory (宮崎地方気象台, Miyazaki Chihō Kishōdai)
- Okinawa Meteorological Observatory (沖縄気象台, Okinawa Kishōdai) - Okinawa Region Central Forecast Office (沖縄地方予報中枢官署, Okinawa Chihō Yohō Chūsū Kansho)
  - Miyakojima Local Meteorological Observatory (宮古島地方気象台, Miyakojima Chihō Kishōdai)
  - Ishigakijima Local Meteorological Observatory (石垣島地方気象台, Ishigakijima Chihō Kishōdai)
  - Minamidaitoujima Local Meteorological Observatory (南大東島地方気象台, Minamidaitōjima Chihō Kishōdai)
