= Hypercorrection (psychology) =

Hypercorrection is the higher likelihood of correcting a general knowledge error when originally certain that their information is accurate, as opposed to being unsure of it. The phenomenon suggests that once general knowledge information is confidently misremembered by someone and the person learns the right version after their initial response is corrected, their likelihood of remembering this piece of information will be higher than that of someone who was unsure of their initial answer. It refers to the finding that when given corrective feedback, errors that are committed with high confidence are easier to correct than low-confidence errors.

For example, a student taking a test on state capitals is certain that Pittsburgh is the capital of Pennsylvania. When the test is returned, the answer has been corrected to Harrisburg. Shocked that the answer was incorrect, the student is more likely to remember the correct answer than a student who was originally unsure.

The hypercorrection effect explores whether making mistakes early on in the learning process can be beneficial to the learner and their encoding of the material.

== History ==
The pattern was named "hypercorrection" by psychologists Janet Metcalfe and Brady Butterfield of Columbia University in 2001. However, it was originally noticed by Raymond W. Kulhavy (1977), who wrote an educational review focusing on students and the correction process. Kulhavy discovered that those students who had confidently answered incorrectly on tests or other modes of examination such as homework, when corrected, were much more likely to remember the material on later tests.

In a study by the same researchers in 2006, Metcalfe and Butterfield, the hypercorrection effect and its implications were further examined. Beginning with the presupposition that an error committed with high confidence would require a great deal of effort to overwrite, the researchers concluded that errors committed with a great deal of confidence were among the easiest errors to correct.

== Research ==
Even though conceptions about hypercorrection emerged in educational research, it is not limited only to the learning environment. General knowledge errors can be learned from books, movies, or television, especially with the natural tendency to believe things are true. A common example is the misconception that raindrops are tear-shaped. Understandably, many believe this because of depictions of such raindrops on weather channels.

In the past few years, hypercorrection research has focused on the factors behind it and whether people of all ages exhibit this phenomenon. There has been evidence that surprise or embarrassment of getting the answer wrong has an important role in hypercorrection. As people fear being ridiculed for answering a general knowledge question incorrectly, they are more likely to remember a confident mistake they made. For example, a person suggests that scallops come from trees. This person's friends laugh, pointing out that scallops come from the ocean. Embarrassed that the response was incorrect, the person makes sure to remember this fact to avoid embarrassment.

Another factor implicated in hypercorrection is that there will be more vocabulary or knowledge used about answers that the individual is certain of instead of unsure about, possibly implying that people are more familiar with the answers they are confident with. As research on hypercorrection shows, subjects are likely to guess or pick the correct answer on retests when they were sure about their response on the original test. This suggests that familiarity with the information may be part of producing the hypercorrection effect.

The claims about the hypercorrection effect stating that it has a significant part in the correction of mistakes have also been supported by a study done using brain imaging. Janet Metcalfe, Brady Butterfield, Christian Habeck, and Yaakov Stern (2012) conducted an experiment using fMRI to observe neural correlations related to the hypercorrection effects in people. 15 people participated in the experiment; 10 women and 5 men. The experimenters delivered a questionnaire to the participants and recorded brain activities using fMRI, while correcting incorrect answers. It was discovered that while participants received their correction after committing a mistake, the brain showed activation of the temporoparietal junction (TPJ) which indicates that they were entertaining the original false belief as well as the true belief.

Because the hypercorrection effect is all about our knowledge, knowledge errors, and their effects on our correction of knowledge errors, it seems likely that this effect will have been studied in genuine classroom settings. Yet, hypercorrection effects have mostly been studied by observation only of past scenarios. This effect has mostly been studied only in typical laboratory settings. A study done by Carpenter, Haynes, Corral, and Yeung (2018) is one of the first times this effect has been studied in an authentic educational context. This study was conducted in a university’s introductory horticulture class. The students in this class were first presented with questionnaires related to the educational content of that course. They were then presented with the correct answers and were later given a post-test to test the same information in the same way once again. When analyzing the test results, the researchers determined that a powerful hypercorrection effect was present. They found that students who had a higher previous knowledge and understanding of the material not only showed a higher confidence in their original answers but also exhibited a much more prevalent and more impressive hypercorrection effect of their inaccurate answers. These and other studies suggest that greater general knowledge of the topic tends to bring with it a more potent hypercorrection effect.

Janet Metcalfe (2017) explores the effect and possible repercussions of not using this hypercorrection effect to our advantage in the classroom. In an annual psychology review she wrote on this topic; she explains how focusing solely on avoiding errors completely before testing in the classroom may actually be a disadvantageous method of teaching and learning. This claim is made only for neurologically typical students. Metcalfe even goes as far as to say that it may actually be a beneficial practice for students in education to commit and correct errors while in low-stakes situations as a method of coming to learn and understand the given material more unshakably. In addition to the benefits of making errors to the learners, Metcalfe also claims that the process of hearing the errors and correcting them can be helpful for the teachers: Aside from the direct benefit to learners, teachers gain valuable information from errors, and error tolerance encourages students’ active, exploratory, generative engagement. This adds another beneficial aspect of hypercorrection in education, further proving the importance of the theory.

== Hypercorrection and age ==
There have been implications that age plays a role within the hypercorrection effect, after research showed that not all people showed this effect. Most studies in the past have asked young adults to answer general knowledge questions. Recently, older adults have been tested and have not shown the hypercorrection effect, though this does not provide definitive evidence to state that older adults cannot exhibit this phenomenon. However, whether older adults are better at correcting knowledge they are unsure about or they are worse at hypercorrection is still to be determined. The results for children are not concrete, but some say that the prefrontal cortex, a part of the brain that is crucial to memory, is important for the hypercorrection effect. This would be a plausible explanation since elders may have impaired prefrontal cortices and those of children may be underdeveloped.

In speaking about the difference in hypercorrection’s effects relative to age, we learn from Metcalfe, Stern, and Eich (2014) that while older adults were seen to do a better job with general test accuracy, they had a low occurrence of the hypercorrection effect while younger adults were shown to display this phenomenon more frequently. However, the researchers found out later that this was not because of a problem with their memory and processing mechanisms of older people. They tend to hypercorrect less, because older adults tended to correct all of their errors rather than just focusing on high-confidence errors. Although this finding raises another question regarding the learning abilities of older adults, if they are so much better at focusing on all errors they make than young people, how is it harder to learn at an older age? The researchers suggest that their experiment, that was conducted in vitro with factual pieces of information, can have a different outcome than real life, since older adults could be particularly motivated to learn the truth, and capable of engaging their attention to this end. However, this suggestion remains unexplored in the field and needs further research to be proven.

== Problems ==
Research conducted by Andrew Butler, Lisa Fazio and Elizabeth Marsh found that high-confidence errors are more likely to be corrected, but they are also more likely to be reproduced if the correct answer is forgotten. For the research, subjects were presented with general knowledge questions and asked about their confidence levels for their answers, as the wrong answers were corrected afterwards. Half of the subjects were asked the same question right after the test, while the other half were asked a week later. The research showed that after an initial period of one week, subjects were less likely to remember the answers to the same general knowledge questions correctly. Even more importantly, high-confidence errors were more likely than low-confidence errors to be reproduced on the delayed test. The findings suggest an important fact about hypercorrection: high-confidence errors are more likely to be corrected, but they are also more likely to be reproduced if the correct answer is forgotten, especially after a period of time.

== Recent developments ==
The hypercorrection effect has been demonstrated and replicated in several settings and with many different types of participants in recent years. Metcalfe, J., & Miele, D. B. (2014). Hypercorrection of high confidence errors: Prior testing both enhances delayed performance and blocks the return of the errors. The hypercorrection effect was tested with participants from the general population but was also demonstrated with a group of children with autism spectrum disorder. Though those tested with autism spectrum disorder had a significantly weaker general metacognitive ability than previous participants without any mental disorders, they did not show any evidence of a weakened hypercorrection effect. Thus, the hypercorrection effect is seen by many to be completely disconnected from general metacognitive ability and is a phenomenon common among us all.

== See also ==
- Dunning-Kruger effect – Cognitive bias about one's own skill
