= Weather channel =

A weather channel is a television channel which specializes in weather oriented programming. These channels are often distinct from more typical weather forecast coverage on broad-coverage news, and may themselves be subsidiaries or sister channels of more general coverage news channels - as is the case with Fox Weather and its relationship with Fox News. They also may be fully stand-alone channels whose entire set of operations is focused upon weather broadcasting, with no general news channel counterpart offered, as is the case with Weathernews Inc.

Such channels originated in 1982 with the first broadcast of The Weather Channel, whose initial concept was developed by John Coleman, an American meteorologist, four years prior, in 1978.

== Examples ==
=== United States ===
- The Weather Channel
- AccuWeather Network
- NBC Weather Plus
- Fox Weather
- WeatherNation TV

=== Other countries ===
- Sky News Weather Channel (Australian)
- Weathernews Inc. (Japanese)
  - Weathernews LiVE, a 24-hour livestream of weather coverage operated by Weathernews Inc.
- The Weather Network (Canadian)
