= WNI =

WNI or wni may refer to:

- WNI, the IATA code for Matahora Airport, Southeast Sulawesi, Indonesia
- wni, the ISO 639-3 code for Ndzwani dialect, Comoros and Mayotte
- Warga Negara Indonesia, the Indonesian term for an Indonesian citizen
- Weathernews LiVE, a 24-hour run Japanese weather news channel
