= Emergency Warning Broadcast System =

Emergency Warning Broadcast System (EWBS) may refer to:

- Emergency Warning Broadcast System (Japan)
- Emergency Warning Broadcast System (Philippines)
