= Saya Hiyama =

Japanese announcer and meteorologist (born 1993)

- Hiyama Saya (檜山沙耶)
- Born: October 27, 1993 (age 32); Mito, Ibaraki Prefecture, Japan
- Other names: Sayatchi (さやっち), (Note: Also romanised as "Sayacchi") Osaya (おさや)
- Education: Rikkyo University (BS)
- Occupation: Freelance announcer (since 2024); Weather forecaster and disaster prevention specialist (2018 – 2024)
- Years active: 2018 – present
- Employer: Weathernews Inc. (2018 – 2024); irodori, LLC (since 2024)
- Spouse: Yoshihito Nishioka (m. 2024)

Saya Hiyama (Japanese: 檜山沙耶, Hepburn: Hiyama Saya; born October 27, 1993) is a Japanese freelance announcer, former weather forecaster and disaster prevention specialist. She previously worked for Weathernews LiVE (WNL) from 2018 to 2024. Hiyama is signed to irodori, LLC.

== Biography ==
Hiyama was born on October 27, 1993 in Mito, Ibaraki. Hiyama graduated from Ibaraki Christian School High School and later from Rikkyo University's Faculty of Economics. After graduating from university, Hiyama briefly worked at an accounting firm.

Hiyama has said that she has been interested in weather forecasting since she was a student, but did not want to become a news anchor. Following her experience with the Great East Japan Earthquake, Hiyama attended a voice acting school because she wanted a job that involved communication. Originally, she wanted to become a voice actor, but after Mayumi Tanaka, whom she worked with on stage, told her she was suited for narration, she decided to pursue a career as a weather forecaster. She joined the 24-7 live stream Weathernews LiVE in July 2018 at the age of 24 after winning an audition, debuting later in October of the same year, where she served as weather forecaster and disaster prevention specialist.

Hiyama went viral on social media following a clip of her appearance on the 26 February 2021 episode of WeathernewsLiVE Evening, when she seamlessly transitioned from happily talking about shogi to giving an earthquake early warning with serious face.

Hiyama became one of the ambassadors of Ibaraki Prefecture on September 15, 2022. In February 2023, Hiyama was featured as a customized voice for air purifiers produced by Sharp. She retired as a news anchor from Weathernews LiVE on March 30, 2024. Following her departure from Weathernews LiVE, she is working as a freelance announcer.

Hiyama published her first book, Blue Moment, in January 2022, during her WNL tenure, with Wani Books. From October 2024 to September 2025, Hiyama co-hosted the monthly television programme ConBiz: Kontentsu x bijinesu no jōhōkyoku ("ConBiz: contents x business information station") on satellite channel BS NTV; the show is also available worldwide on YouTube.

Since October 2024, Hiyama hosts the weekly radio programme Hiyama Saya no Aniura: Anime no Uragawa wo Nozoku ("Saya Hiyama's Aniura: Looking into Anime's Behind the Scenes") on JOQR, broadcast Sundays at 25:00 (Mondays 01:00) JST.

== Personal life ==
Hiyama said that her hobbies are anime and video games, and said that if she cannot play games or watch anime, she gets depressed. She went viral on Twitter in June 2022 following her posting herself cosplaying as Yor Forger from the 2022 anime Spy × Family.

On July 6, 2023, Hiyama announced her relationship with professional tennis player Yoshihito Nishioka. They later announced their marriage on December 19, 2024.

She holds a second-class bookkeeping certification.

== See also ==
- List of Japanese announcers
