= J-Alert =

Emergency population warning system used in Japan

Diagram of the J-Alert system

J-Alert (Japanese: J－ALERT/Jアラート, romanized: J Arāto; full name 全国瞬時警報システム, Zenkoku Shunji Keihō Shisutemu, 'National Early Warning System') is the early warning system used in Japan. J-Alert had first launched in Japan in February 2007.

The system is designed to quickly inform the public of threats and emergencies such as earthquakes, severe weather, and other dangers. The system was developed in the hope that early warnings would speed up evacuation times and help coordinate emergency response.

== System ==
J-Alert is a satellite based system that allows authorities to quickly broadcast alerts to local media and to citizens directly via a system of nationwide loudspeakers, television, radio, email, and cell broadcasts. According to Japanese officials, it takes about one second to inform local officials, and between four and twenty seconds to relay the message to citizens. An enhanced version of the J-Alert receivers were installed by the end of March 2019. The new models can automatically process the information within two seconds, compared to the older models that can take up to twenty seconds.

J-Alert broadcasts via both ground systems and the Superbird-B3 communication satellite.

When there is a civil emergency such as a ballistic missile heading towards Japan, a siren called Civil Protection Siren sounds across loudspeakers.

== Information transmission capabilities ==
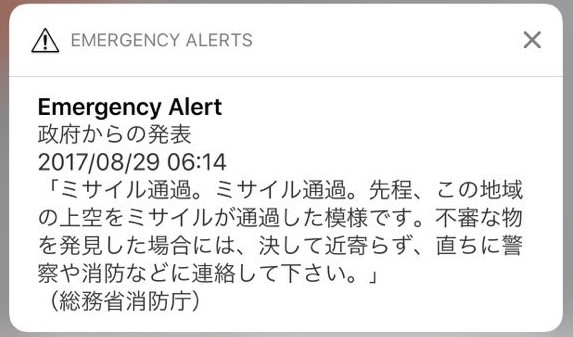
Alert messages sent on 29 August 2017 North Korean missile launch over Japan

- Earthquake
  - Earthquake Early Warning
  - Quick updates on hypocenter, magnitude, and precautions of possible tsunami
  - Information of hypocenter, magnitude, intensities of various areas, and the presence of tsunami
  - Earthquake prediction warning for the Tōkai earthquakes
  - Earthquake prediction advisory information of the Tōkai earthquakes
  - Earthquake prediction information of the Tōkai earthquakes
- Tsunami
  - Major tsunami warning
  - Tsunami warning
  - Tsunami advisory
- Volcano eruption
  - Emergency warning of volcanic eruption and the possibility of eruption
  - Warning of volcanic eruption and the possibility of eruption
  - Volcanic crater forecast
- Severe weather
  - Emergency warnings for heavy rain, heavy snow, gale, snowstorm, waves, and storm surge
  - Warnings for heavy rain, heavy snow, gale, snowstorm, waves, and storm surge
  - Weather advisory
  - Information of the risk of landslides
  - Advisory information for tornado
  - Information of violent heavy rain
  - Flood forecast
- Special emergency threats
  - Information of ballistic missiles
  - Information of airstrikes
  - Information of guerrilla and special forces attacks
  - Information of large-scale terrorism
  - Other information for civil and national defense

== Adoption rate ==
Many prefectures and urban areas were slow in adopting the system. Upon its introduction, the Japanese government hoped to have 80% of the country equipped with the J-Alert system by 2009. However, by 2011, only 36% of the nation had been covered. Cost had been a major factor; the initial installation is estimated to be around 430 million yen, and the yearly maintenance is estimated to be around 10 million yen.

By May 2013, 99.6% of municipalities nationwide were covered.

== Notable instances ==
- On 13 April 2023, a North Korean missile launch warning led residents to take cover from debris that most likely fell into the sea hundreds of miles away. The alert, just before 8 a.m., triggered sirens on Hokkaido and sent automated messages to mobile phones in J-Alert urging the northern island's more than five million residents to seek immediate shelter, after Pyongyang fired a new type of ballistic missile.

== See also ==
- Emergency Warning Broadcast System (Japan)
- Early warning system
- Emergency communication system
- Emergency population warning broadcasting
