= Tsunami Warning (Japan) =

Type of emergency alert issued in Japan

Japan has a nationwide Tsunami Warning system (Japanese: 大津波警報・津波警報・津波注意報). The system usually issues warnings a few minutes after an Earthquake Early Warning (EEW) is issued, should waves be expected, usually when a combination of high magnitude, seaward epicenter and vertical focal mechanism is observed. The tsunami warning was issued within 3 minutes with the most serious rating on its warning scale during the 2011 Tōhoku earthquake and tsunami; it was rated as a "major tsunami", being at least 3 m (9.8 ft) high. An improved system was unveiled on March 7, 2013, following the 2011 disaster to better assess imminent tsunamis.

== Overview ==
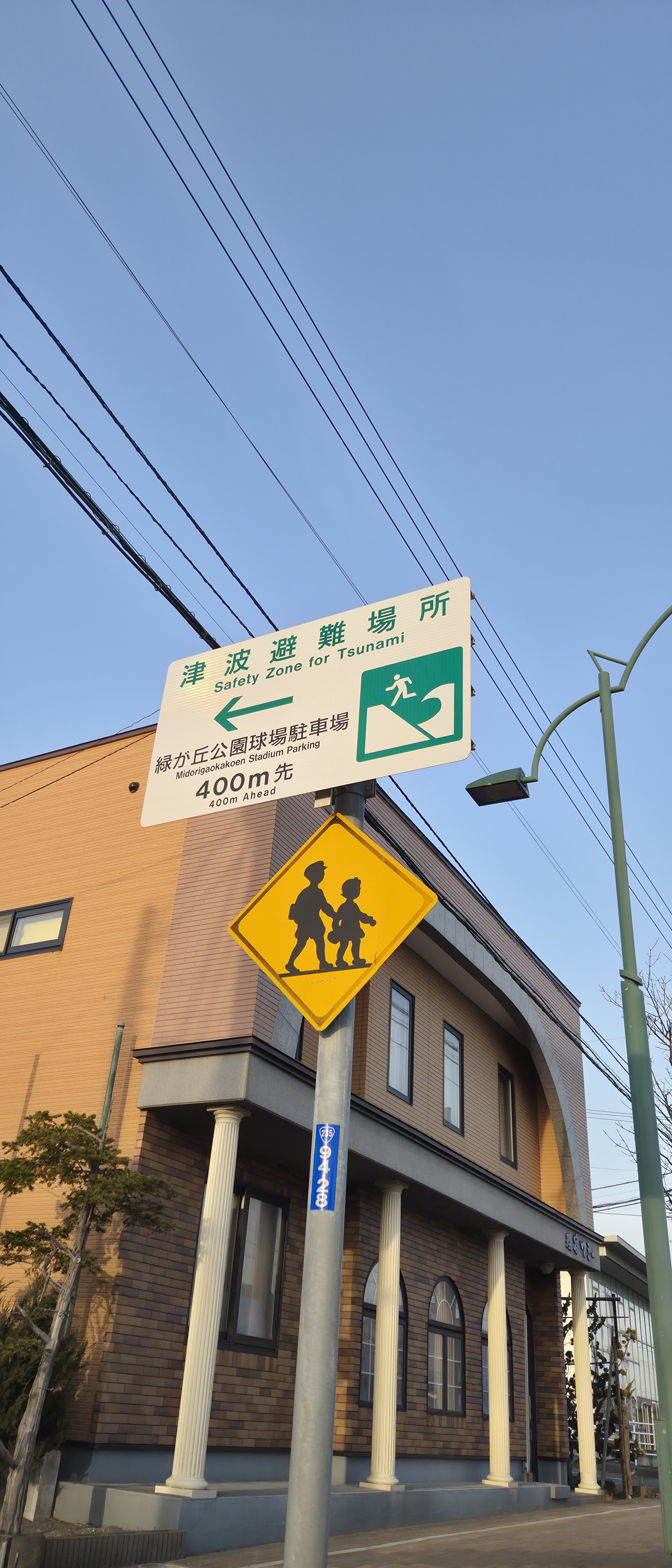
Many coastal cities in Japan have tsunami escape roads alongside city streets, such as this one in Tomakomai, Hokkaido

When an earthquake occurs, the Japan Meteorological Agency (JMA) estimates the possibility of tsunami generation from seismic observation data. If disastrous waves are expected in coastal regions, JMA issues a Tsunami Warning/Advisory for each region expected to be affected based on estimated tsunami heights. JMA also issues information on tsunami details such as estimated arrival times and heights. After an earthquake occurs, JMA issues Tsunami Warnings/Advisories and Tsunami Information bulletins if a tsunami strike is expected. Major Tsunami Warnings are issued in the classification of Emergency Warnings as of 30 August 2013.

== Tsunami Warning / Advisory ==
When an earthquake occurs that could generate a disastrous tsunami in coastal regions of Japan, JMA issues Major Tsunami Warnings, Tsunami Warnings and/or Tsunami Advisories for individual regions based on estimated tsunami heights around three minutes after the quake (or as early as two minutes in some cases (Note: Earthquakes in and around Japan to which JMA can apply the Earthquake Early Warning technique to promptly and accurately determine the hypocenter and magnitude)).

Immediately after an earthquake occurs, JMA promptly establishes its location, magnitude and the related tsunami risk. However, it takes time to determine the exact scale of earthquakes with a magnitude of 8 or more. In such cases, JMA issues an initial warning based on the predefined maximum magnitude to avoid underestimation.

When such values are used, estimated maximum tsunami heights are expressed in qualitative terms such as "Huge" and "High" in initial warnings rather than as quantitative expressions. Once the exact magnitude is determined, JMA updates the warning with estimated maximum tsunami heights expressed in quantitative terms.

| Category | Japanese | Indication | Estimated maximum tsunami heights | | Expected damage and action to be taken |
| Category | Japanese | Indication | Quantitative expression | Qualitative expression | Expected damage and action to be taken |
|---|---|---|---|---|---|
| Major Tsunami Warning (Violet) | 大津波警報 | Tsunami height is expected to be greater than 3 meters. | over 10 m 10 m 5 m | Huge | Wooden structures are expected to be completely destroyed and/or washed away; anybody exposed will be caught in tsunami currents. Evacuate from coastal or river areas immediately to safer places such as high ground or a tsunami evacuation building. |
| Tsunami Warning (Red) | 津波警報 | Tsunami height is expected to be up to 3 meters. | 3 m | High | Tsunami waves will hit, causing damage to low-lying areas. Buildings will be flooded and anybody exposed will be caught in tsunami currents. Evacuate from coastal or river areas immediately to safer places such as high ground or a tsunami evacuation building. |
| Tsunami Advisory (Yellow) | 津波注意報 | Tsunami height is expected to be up to 1 meter. | 1 m | N/A | Anybody exposed will be caught in strong tsunami currents in the sea. Fish farming facilities will be washed away and small vessels may capsize. Get out of the water and leave coastal areas immediately. |

The color scheme above has been standardized in response to the 2011 Tōhoku earthquake and tsunami, with all alerting agencies and broadcasters now using this scheme on their tsunami alert maps.

Major Tsunami Warnings are issued in the classification of Emergency Warnings. Detailed information on Emergency Warnings is provided on the Emergency Warning System article.

A Major Tsunami Warning was also issued after the 2024 Noto earthquake, with an estimated tsunami height of 5 metres in Noto.

== See also ==
- Emergency Warning System
