= National Severe Weather Warning Service =

Weather warning system in the United Kingdom

The National Severe Weather Warning Service (shortened to NSWWS) is a service provided by the Met Office in the United Kingdom. The purpose of this service is to warn the public and emergency responders of severe or hazardous weather which has the potential to cause danger to life or widespread disruption. This allows emergency responders to put plans into place to help protect the public and also allowing the public to make necessary preparations.

== Types of warning ==
Warnings are issued for severe weather which is expected to arrive in the next five days. They are issued in response to eight different weather elements:

- rain,
- thunderstorms,
- lightning,
- snow,
- ice,
- fog,
- wind and
- extreme heat, the newest type of warning, which was added in June 2021.

== Warning colours ==
Warnings are given a colour depending on a combination of both the likelihood of the event happening and the impact the conditions may have and could be yellow, amber or red.

Yellow: Be Aware. Severe weather is possible over the next few days and could affect people in the area concerned. Yellow means that people should plan ahead thinking about possible travel delays, or the disruption of your day-to-day activities. The Met Office is monitoring the developing weather situation and Yellow means to keep an eye on the latest forecast and be aware that the weather may change or worsen, leading to disruption of plans within the next few days.

Amber: Be Prepared. There is an increased likelihood of severely or extremely bad weather affecting people in the area concerned, which could potentially disrupt people's plans and possibly cause travel delays, road and rail closures, interruption to power and the potential risk to life and property. Amber means people need to be prepared to change plans and protect themselves, their family and community from the impacts of the severe weather based on the forecast from the Met Office.

Red: Take Action. Extremely bad weather is expected. Red means people in the areas concerned should take action now to keep themselves and others safe from the impact of the weather. Widespread damage, travel and power disruption and risk to life is likely. People must avoid dangerous areas and they should follow the advice of the emergency services and local authorities.

== Warning distribution ==
The Met Office uses a wide variety of media in order to inform the public of any warnings that have been issued.

- Television and radio are still the main way that people keep up-to-date with the weather so the Met Office uses the weather broadcasts on terrestrial television and radio stations to highlight significant weather warnings.
- The Met Office also uses a wide variety of social media in order to highlight severe weather and warnings that have been issued. These range from the website, Facebook and Twitter to their own YouTube channel.
- The Met Office has developed weather apps for mobile devices which allow users to set up notifications which will alert them when a warning has been issued for their area of interest.
- Since December 2024, the Met Office has also made use of the UK Emergency Alert System to alert people of extreme weather.

== See also ==
- Severe weather terminology (disambiguation)
