= Severe weather terminology =

Severe weather terminology is different around the world, varying between regions and countries. These are articles which explain terminology in various parts of the world.

- Severe weather terminology (United States)
- Severe weather terminology (Canada)
- Severe weather terminology (Japan)
- Hong Kong tropical cyclone warning signals
- National Severe Weather Warning Service
