= Tokyo District Meteorological Observatory =

Coordinates: 35°46′36″N 139°31′57″E

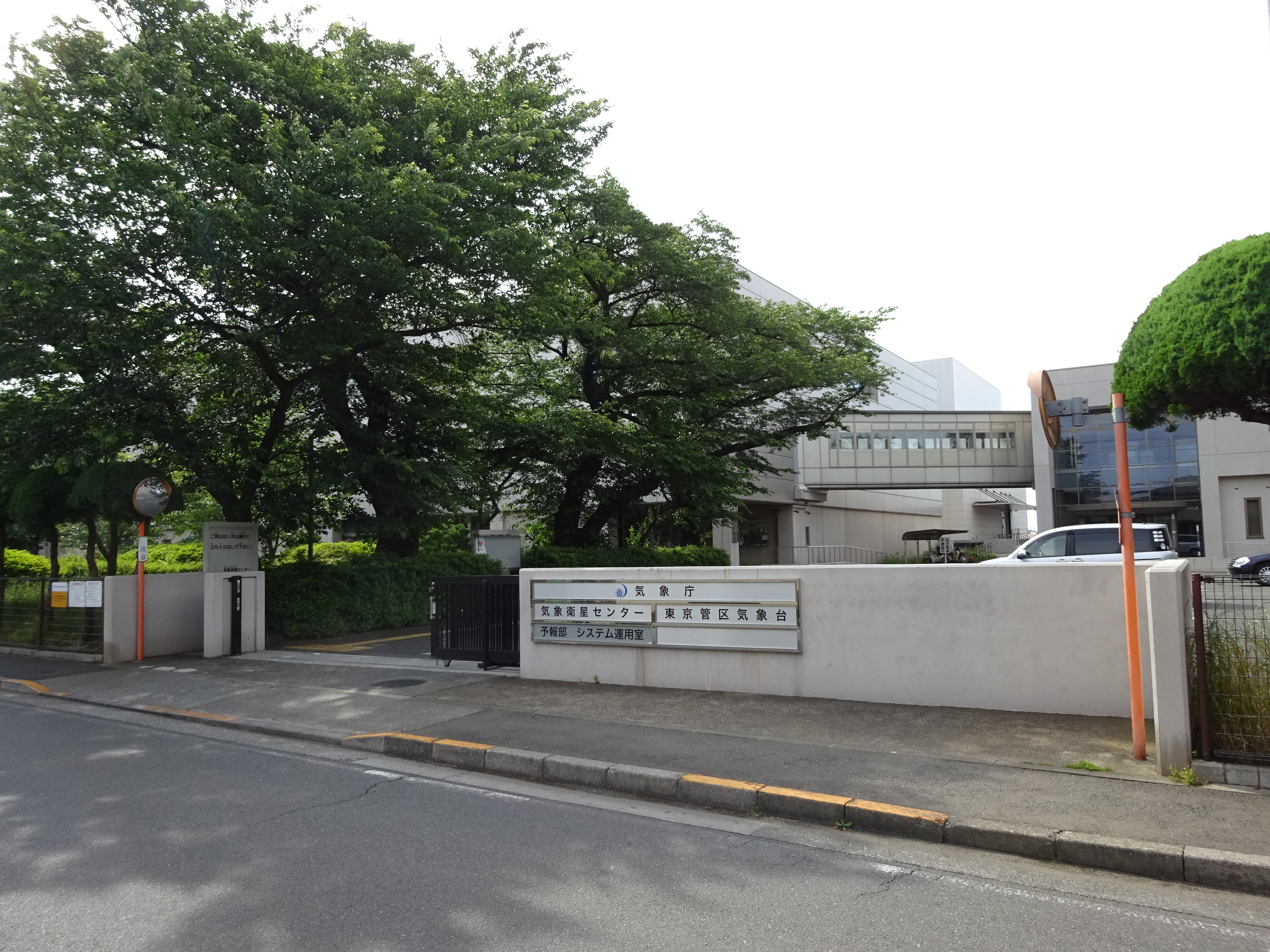
JMA's Meteorological Satellite Center, Tokyo District Meteorological Observatory, and Office of Computer Systems Operation, Information and Communications Technology Division, Information Infrastructure Department

Tokyo District Meteorological Observatory (東京管区気象台, Tōkyō Kanku Kishōdai), abbreviated as TDMO, is one of the five District Meteorological Observatories of the Japan Meteorological Agency. It has jurisdiction over the Kantō and Chūbu regions: Tokyo, Kanagawa, Chiba, Saitama, Ibaraki, Tochigi, Gunma, Yamanashi, Nagano, Niigata, Shizuoka, Aichi, Gifu, Mie, Ishikawa, Toyama and Fukui, and is responsible for acquiring meteorological, hydrological, seismological and volcanological data and forecasting local weather conditions in those areas through its local meteorological observatories. It also fills the role of Region Central Forecast Office (地方予報中枢官署, Chihō Yohō Chūsū Kansho) for the Kantō region. The TDMO is based inside the JMA Meteorological Satellite Center located in Kiyose, Tokyo.

== The LMOs within TDMO's supervision ==
=== Local Meteorological Observatories ===
Bold-faced LMOs are the Region Central Forecast Offices.

- Mito Local Meteorological Observatory (水戸地方気象台, Mito Chihō Kishōdai)
- Utsunomiya Local Meteorological Observatory (宇都宮地方気象台, Utsunomiya Chihō Kishōdai)
- Maebashi Local Meteorological Observatory (前橋地方気象台, Maebashi Chihō Kishōdai)
- Kumagaya Local Meteorological Observatory (熊谷地方気象台, Kumagaya Chihō Kishōdai)
- Chōshi Local Meteorological Observatory (銚子地方気象台, Chōshi Chihō Kishōdai)
- Yokohama Local Meteorological Observatory (横浜地方気象台, Yokohama Chihō Kishōdai)
- Kōfu Local Meteorological Observatory (甲府地方気象台, Kōfu Chihō Kishōdai)
- Nagano Local Meteorological Observatory (長野地方気象台, Nagano Chihō Kishōdai)
- Niigata Local Meteorological Observatory (新潟地方気象台, Niigata Chihō Kishōdai)
- Toyama Local Meteorological Observatory (富山地方気象台, Toyama Chihō Kishōdai)
- Kanazawa Local Meteorological Observatory (金沢地方気象台, Kanazawa Chihō Kishōdai)
- Fukui Local Meteorological Observatory (福井地方気象台, Fukui Chihō Kishōdai)
- Nagoya Local Meteorological Observatory (名古屋地方気象台, Nagoya Chihō Kishōdai)
- Gifu Local Meteorological Observatory (岐阜地方気象台, Gifu Chihō Kishōdai)
- Shizuoka Local Meteorological Observatory (静岡地方気象台, Shizuoka Chihō Kishōdai)
- Tsu Local Meteorological Observatory (津地方気象台, Tsu Chihō Kishōdai)

=== Aviation Weather Service Centers ===
- Tokyo Aviation Weather Service Center (東京航空地方気象台, Tokyo Kōkū Chihō Kishōdai)
- Narita Aviation Weather Service Center (成田航空地方気象台, Narita Kōkū Chihō Kishōdai)
- Chūbu Aviation Weather Service Center (中部航空地方気象台, Chūbu Kōkū Chihō Kishōdai)

=== Resident Offices for Volcanic Disaster Mitigation ===
- Resident Office for Volcanic Disaster Mitigation at Asamayama (浅間山火山防災連絡事務所, Asamayama Kazan Bōsai Renraku Jimusho)
- Resident Office for Volcanic Disaster Mitigation at Izu-Oshima (伊豆大島火山防災連絡事務所, Izu-Ōshima Kazan Bōsai Renraku Jimusho)
- Resident Office for Volcanic Disaster Mitigation at Miyake-jima (三宅島火山防災連絡事務所, Miyake-jima Kazan Bōsai Renraku Jimusho)
