= Okinawa Meteorological Observatory =

The Okinawa Meteorological Observatory (沖縄気象台, Okinawa Kishōdai) is a JMA located in Naha, Okinawa. It is responsible for weather services in the Okinawa region and operates three Local Meteorological Observatories as well as an Aviation Weather Station.

== History ==
- 1887 - The Okinawa Prefectural Naha Second-Class Weather Station (沖縄県立那覇二等測候所, Okinawa-kenritsu Naha Nitō Sokkōjo) was established.
- 1900 - Promoted from the Second-Class Weather Station to the First-Class Weather Station (一等測候所, Ittō Sokkōjo).
- 1924 - The whole building of observatory burned down and all of the observational records got lost.
- 1932 - Renamed to the Okinawa Branch Station of the Central Meteorological Observatory (中央気象台沖縄支台, Chūō Kishōdai Okinawa Shidai).
- 1939 - Renamed to the Okinawa Local Meteorological Observatory (沖縄地方気象台, Okinawa Chihō Kishōdai)
- August 11, 1945 - Demoted to the Okinawa Weather Station (沖縄測候所, Okinawa Sokkōjo)
- November 13, 1946 - Okinawa Weather Station was abolished.
- January 1950 - The Ryukyu Meteorological Administration (琉球気象局, Ryūkyū Kishōkyoku) was established.
- March 1950 - Renamed to the Ryukyu Meteorological Agency (琉球気象庁, Ryūkyū Kishōchō).
- April 1950 - Ryukyu Meteorological Observatory (琉球気象台, Ryūkyū Kishōdai)
- April 1, 1952 - Fall under the Bureau of Posts, Government of the Ryukyu Islands (琉球政府郵政局, Ryūkyū Seifu Yūseikyoku).
- August 1, 1965 - Reorganized into an agency of the Bureau of International Trade and Industry (通商産業局, Tsūshō Sangyōkyoku) after the Reform of the Government of the Ryukyu Islands.
- 1972 - Reorganized and renamed as Okinawa Meteorological Observatory (沖縄気象台, Okinawa Kishōdai).
- 1987 - Having moved to the present building.
