= Weathernews LiVE =

Japanese streaming TV channel

Weathernews LiVE ウェザーニュースLiVE
- Weathernews
- Type: News, weather
- Country: Japan
- Broadcast area: Nationwide (online, TV [part-time]); Worldwide (online)
- Headquarters: Makuhari Techno Garden, Chiba, Japan

Programming
- Language: Japanese
- Picture format: 1080p

Ownership
- Owner: Weathernews, Inc.
- Key people: Hiroyuki Murata (producer)

History
- Launched: April 16, 2018; 8 years ago
- Replaced: SOLiVE24 and WX24

Links
- Webcast: youtube.com/weathernews/, tiktok.com/@weathernewslive/live, channel.rakuten.co.jp?channel=45
- Website: weathernews.jp/wnl/

Weathernews LiVE (ウェザーニュースLiVE, Uezānyusu LiVE) (WNL) is a Japanese 24-hour live channel owned and operated by Weathernews Inc. (WNI), the largest privately owned weather company in the world. WNL started broadcasting 16 April 2018, replacing the original BS Weathernews/WX 24 and SOLiVE 24, a similar streaming service also operated by WNI since 27 April 2009.

Though primarily an internet service, as of November 2024 WNL also does simulcasts or inserts some of its programmes in other paid TV or local television channels around Japan.

== Programming ==
Weathernews LiVE broadcasts six live programmes of three hours each from 05:00 to 23:00 JST every day; the programmes are routinely divided into 30-minute blocks (around 25 minutes of content and intervals of approximately 5 minutes). The remaining hours are filled with updated weather information graphics and no on-air talent; in case of an emergency, special programming is broadcast and, if necessary, a meteorologist and/or a presenter will provide updates. The channel is focused on weather and meteorological information for Japan, including typhoons, volcanic activity and earthquakes.

Most of the content is provided by meteorology professionals by parent company WNI, with weather reports sent by users of the company's mobile app featured during the programming, including guides on how to use some of its features and how to send a report. Some segments, depending on the hour of the day, include the anniversaries of the day, the Japanese seasonal days, weather or Japanese culture-related quizzes, or simply ad lib by the presenters known as casters, who routinely interact with the audience through YouTube or Niconico's chat feature.

As of November 2025, WNL broadcasts live on the internet through YouTube, Rakuten Channel and TikTok. It previously streamed on Twitch, Facebook, Twitter, Mildom, LINE Live and Niconico.

WNL is home to Weatheroid Type A Airi (nicknamed Ponko), a character based on presenter Airi Yamagishi, who also dubs her voice during her weekly programme on Thursday nights, broadcast since 2014 during the SOLiVE24 era and as of April 2023 preempting the last hour of Weathernews LiVE Moon. The character was introduced in April 2012.

In late February 2021, a video where then presenter Saya Hiyama switches from light-hearted banter to an earthquake early warning in a few seconds became a viral phenomenon on internet and gave WNL some renown overseas. The clip, shared by one of dozens of WNL fan channels on YouTube, has more than 28 million views as of April 2022. Another clip of Hiyama posted 12 November 2021 has earned more than 13 million views on YouTube in part because it was featured on the Daily Mail website. Hiyama, who joined WNL in 2018, left the channel on 30 March 2024; her last programme, Evening, reached 23,000 live viewers on YouTube.

WNL's YouTube channel reached 1 million subscribers 20 April 2023.

=== Programmes ===
As of November 2025:

- Weathernews LiVE Morning: 05:00 to 08:00 JST
- Weathernews LiVE Sunshine: 08:00 to 11:00 JST
- Weathernews LiVE Coffee Time: 11:00 to 14:00 JST
- Weathernews LiVE Afternoon: 14:00 to 17:00 JST
- Weathernews LiVE Evening: 17:00 to 20:00 JST
- Weathernews LiVE Moon: 20:00 to 23:00 JST

=== TV simulcasts ===
As of February 2025, some WNL programmes are simulcast on:

- Over-the-air Mie Prefecture's local station MTV's digital subchannel 072: some segments of Morning (06:00-07:59 block), Sunshine (08:00-08:30 block), Coffee Time (11:40-12:29 block) and Afternoon (15:20-17:00 block) on weekdays.
- Satellite channel BS Fuji: the first half hour of Weathernews LiVE Morning (referred to as BS Fuji x Weathernews), also broadcast, upscaled, on BS Fuji 4K.
- Satellite channel BS Yoshimoto: the third half hour of Weathernews LiVE Morning
- Satellite channel BS TwellV (BS 12): the Sunday 03:00-04:00 JST early morning slot, at this time (pre-dawn hours) WNL shows only graphics of the weather for the following day.
- South Korean cable channel Ch.W (as 웨더 라이프), during the overnight/early morning 03:00-06:00 JST/KST timeslot.

== Personnel ==
=== Presenters (casters) ===
As of October 2026:

- Airi Yamagishi (debuted 28 April 2009 at SOLiVE Morning)
- Sayane Egawa (debuted 24 December 2011 at SOLiVE Twilight; on maternity leave from Jan 2020 to Mar 2021 & from May 2023 to July 2024)
- Ayaka Matsuyuki (debuted 7 April 2014 at SOLiVE Morning; on maternity leave from October 2021 to May 2023 & from July 2025)
- Yukari Shirai (debuted 7 September 2015 at SOLiVE Morning; on maternity leave from May 2023 to July 2024)
- Yui Komaki (debuted 18 October 2018 at Weathernews Live 16:00-17:00 block, on indefinite break from Sep 2026 due to medical condition)
- Mizuki Tokita (debuted 2 December 2021 at Weathernews LiVE Coffee Time (13:00-14:00 block))
- Akira Kawabata (on-air meteorologist filling as caster, debuted 20 April 2022 at Weathernews LiVE Afternoon)
- Riena Kobayashi (debuted 31 August 2022 at Weathernews LiVE Coffee Time (13:00-14:00 block))
- Mayu Uozumi (debuted 27 April 2023 at Weathernews LiVE Coffee Time (12:30-14:00 block))
- Senna Ogawa (debuted 27 April 2023 at Weathernews LiVE Coffee Time (11:00-12:30 block))
- Momoka Aohara (debuted 21 October 2023 at Weathernews LiVE Coffee Time (12:30-14:00 block))
- Yuiko Lisa Okamoto (debuted 21 October 2023 at Weathernews LiVE Coffee Time (11:30-12:30 block))
- Takafumi Fukuyoshi (Weathernews LiVE producer and former EBC announcer, debuted 7 August 2024 at Weathernews LiVE Afternoon and Weathernews LiVE Evening)
- Manaha Tanabe (debuted 2 July 2025 at Weathernews LiVE Coffee Time (12:30-14:00 block))
- Mao Matsumoto (debuted 2 July 2025 at Weathernews LiVE Coffee Time (11:00-12:30 block))
- Kenshin Sato (debuted 1 October 2026 at Weathernews LiVE Coffee Time)

=== On-air meteorologists ===
As of April 2026:

- Takehisa Yamaguchi
- Tatsuya Unozawa
- Tatsuō Yoshino
- Kunihiro Naitō
- Akira Kawabata (filling as a presenter since 20 April 2022, he occasionally returns as an on-air meteorologist)
- Tatsuya Honda
- Eiichi Iijima
- Tetsuo Aruga
