= Earthquake Early Warning (Japan) =

Japanese alert system

External audio
- Earthquake Early Warning alarm from NHK by ja:伊福部達
- Earthquake Early Warning from the Real-time Earthquake Information Center

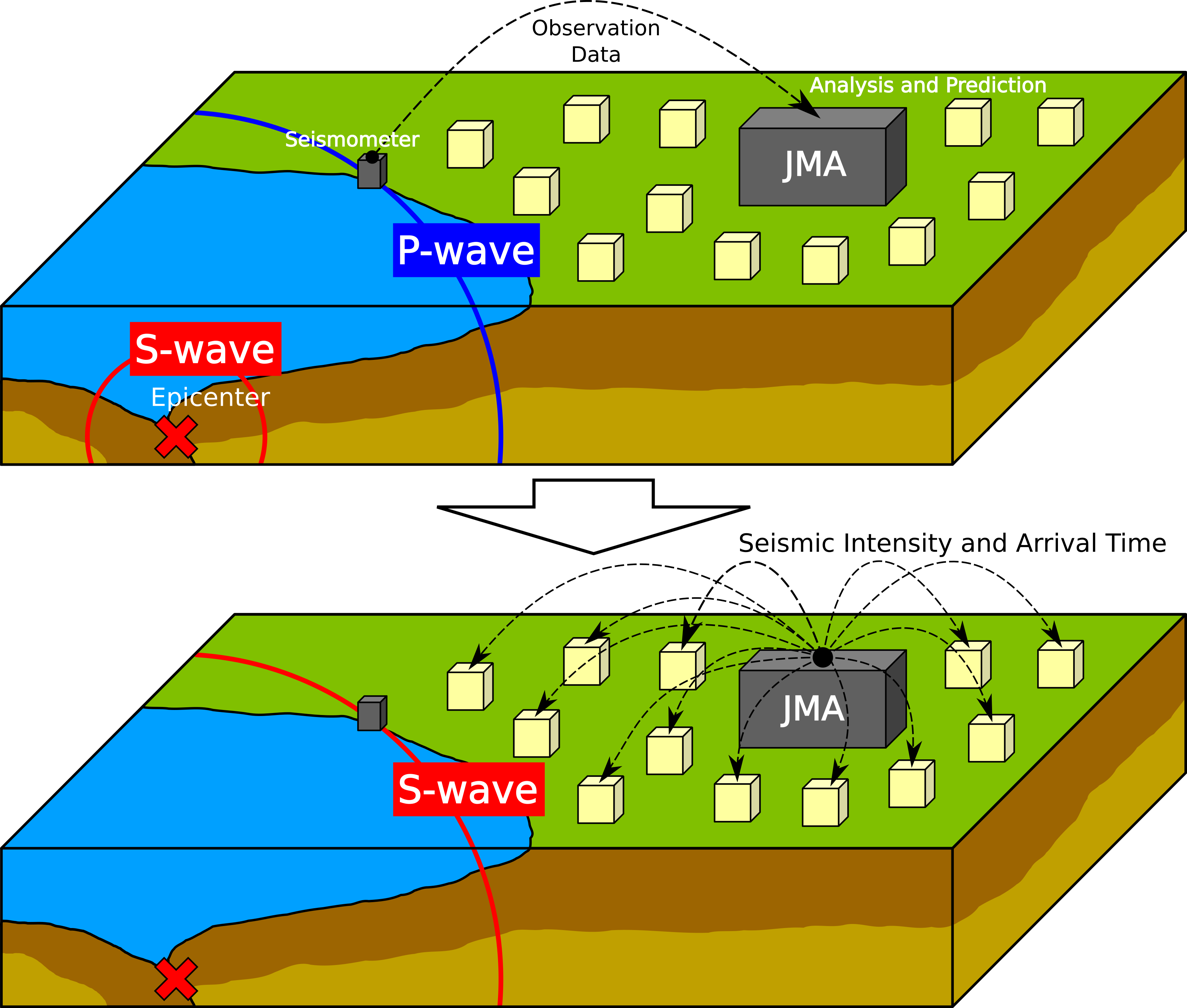
Mechanism of Earthquake Early Warning

In Japan, the Earthquake Early Warning (EEW) (緊急地震速報, Kinkyū Jishin Sokuhō) is an alert that is issued when an earthquake is detected by multiple seismometers. These warnings are primarily issued by the Japan Meteorological Agency (JMA), with guidance on how to react to them.

== Introduction ==
The JMA has two EEW systems: one for the general public and another for the National Meteorological and Hydrological Services. When a P-wave is detected from two (or more) of the 4,235 seismometers installed throughout Japan, the JMA analyzes and predicts the approximate location of the earthquake's epicenter. This allows the JMA to notify people in affected prefectures by TV and radio if a strong earthquake is expected.

An Earthquake Early Warning is issued to warn the general public when an earthquake of 5 or higher on the Japan seismic scale is expected to areas where the seismic intensity is expected to be 4 or higher. An EEW forecast (緊急地震速報(予報)) is issued to the National Meteorological and Hydrological Services when an earthquake of 3 or higher on the Japan seismic scale (or 3.5 or higher on the Richter magnitude scale) is expected, or when the amplitude of P- or S-waves measures more than 100 gals.

The system was developed to minimize earthquake damage and enable people to take shelter or evacuate dangerous areas before the arrival of its strong surface waves. It is used by railways to slow trains and by factories to halt assembly lines before the earthquake hits.

The effectiveness of the warning depends on the position of the receiver. After receiving a warning, a person has from a few seconds to a minute or more to take action. Areas near an epicenter may experience strong tremors before a warning is issued.

== Hit rate ==
The JMA announced the Earthquake Early Warning hit (accuracy) rate for the 2011 fiscal year on 31 May 2012. The hit rate is the percentage of warnings issued immediately on the detection of P-waves with a Japan Meteorological Agency seismic intensity scale (震度, shindo) number (0 to 7) within one shindo number of the measured earthquake.

For the fiscal years 2007–2009, the hit rate was 75 percent or higher (75 percent in 2007, 82 percent in 2008 and 76 percent in 2009). The 2010 hit rate fell to 28 percent, due to the number of aftershocks following the 2011 Tōhoku earthquake (which occurred near the end of the 2010 fiscal year); before the earthquake, the hit rate was 72 percent. Measurement techniques have since been refined to ignore minor earthquakes, and the hit rate for FY2011 increased to 56 percent. The JMA intended to increase the hit rate to over 85 percent by FY2015.

=== Inaccuracies ===
Although EEW (Earthquake Early Warning) accuracy has been increasing, the following erroneous alarms have been issued:

- March 11, 2011 – Warnings were issued that were too severe since multiple separate aftershocks were read as a single quake. In addition, severity was underestimated, causing failure to issue warnings in the Kanto region.
- August 8, 2013 – Although an emergency earthquake bulletin was announced at 16:56 JST from Kanto to Kyushu, no shaking was observed. Noise from the ocean-floor seismograph off southeastern Mie Prefecture was recorded at the same time as shaking from a magnitude 2.3 earthquake in northern Wakayama Prefecture.
- January 5, 2018 – An 11:02 JST earthquake warning for the Kantō region and Fukushima Prefecture was an overestimation, caused by assessing concurrent earthquakes in Toyama Prefecture (magnitude 3.9) and Ibaraki Prefecture (magnitude 4.4) as a single quake.
- July 30, 2020 – The epicenter of a 5.8 magnitude earthquake south of Japan was miscalculated, causing the EEW to overestimate the size of the earthquake to be at a magnitude of 7.3, as well as erroneously placing the epicenter to much closer to Japan's main island, Honshū, than it actually was. There were no reports of any significant tremors.
- July 28, 2022 – At 16:05 JST an earthquake warning was issued for the area between the Kanto and Kyushu regions (with intensity 5-), but no shaking was observed. The warning was quickly cancelled afterwards. It might have been caused by the noise of lightning strikes.
- October 16, 2026 - At around 12:40 JST, an earthquake warning was issued covering areas from Hokkaido to the Chūbu region, reporting an alleged magnitude 9.9 earthquake near the Kuril Islands and predicting a maximum seismic intensity of 7. The warning prompted temporary suspensions of some transport services, including the Tōkaidō Shinkansen. At 12:48 JST, approximately eight minutes after issuance, the warning was cancelled, making it the first warning to be cancelled since the system was introduced. The actual earthquake was a magnitude 6.9 event at a depth of approximately 135 km near the Kamchatka Peninsula. At a press conference that afternoon, the JMA apologised and attributed the incident to an internal information-processing error that caused the system to overestimate the earthquake's magnitude and miscalculate its location, ruling out a cyberattack. Additionally, an anomaly in the alert data led NTT docomo to experience a failure in delivering the alert information to subscribers of NTT docomo during the alert. NTT could not judge parts of the alert as correct. As a result of the false alert, the NTT system was improved to allow delivery of alerts in the different format.

=== Improvements ===
Technical improvements are being made to increase the hit rate, including the Integrated Particle Filter (IPF) and Propagation of Local Undamped Motion (PLUM) methods. The IPF method, introduced on 14 December 2016, obtains seismic source elements with a particle filter. The PLUM method, introduced on 22 March 2018, predicts the seismic intensity directly from observed intensity without estimating the hypocenter and scale. Accurate seismic-intensity forecasts can be made for large earthquakes or those whose hypocenter is unknown.

== Broadcast format ==
=== Television ===
On NHK television channels and other Japanese TV broadcasters (ISDB, including 1seg), an alert is a message window on the screen with the earthquake epicenter (shown as a red X with a white outline) and areas affected by strong tremors. Two sets of chimes sound, followed by a voice announcement in Japanese: "This is an Earthquake Early Warning. Please prepare for powerful tremors." (「緊急地震速報です。強い揺れに警戒してください。」, "Kinkyū Jishin Sokuhō desu. Tsuyoi yure ni keikai shite kudasai.") In addition to NHK, the announcement is used by Fuji TV, TV Asahi and Tokyo MX. Nippon TV and TBS shorten it to "Kinkyū Jishin Sokuhō desu" ("This is an Earthquake Early Warning"). TV Tokyo sounds a set of chimes, without a voice announcement.

The alerts also inform viewers of possible landslides or a tsunami caused by the quake in the affected area. If tsunami warnings are issued, the system utilizes 1seg to automatically turn on (and tune to NHK) all radios and televisions with 1seg technology in at-risk areas. In addition to Japanese, the warnings are broadcast in English, Mandarin, Vietnamese, Korean and Portuguese.

=== Mobile-phone networks ===
Japan's three major mobile phone carriers—NTT docomo, au (KDDI and Okinawa Cellular) and SoftBank Mobile—have developed Cell Broadcast systems to send multiple users an SMS of the EEW.

It is mandatory for 3G cell phones sold after 2007 to receive this service, although foreign manufacturers such as Nokia, Apple, HTC, LG and Samsung are exempt. In August 2011, Apple announced that its iOS 5 iPhone platform would support EEW notification.

== Other ==
=== NTT Docomo Inc. ===
EEW is enabled by default on all models of the FOMA 905i series (FOMA 905iシリーズ) released after 26 November 2007, and on some FOMA high-speed models in the FOMA 705i series (FOMA 705iシリーズ) released after February 2008.

=== au ===
The system was enabled on all models in early 2008, including W61CA, W61H, W61K, W61SA, W61SH, W62SA and a few smartphone models, such as IS02 (TSI01). KDDI and Okinawa Cellular began free EEW broadcasts via au's SMS, C-mail (ja:Cメール), on 25 March 2008.

=== SoftBank Mobile ===
On 30 May 2007, SoftBank announced development of an EEW broadcast system similar to NTT docomo's and au's. Deployment of the system was originally planned for FY2008, but was postponed for two years. On 25 August 2010, EEW service began on Shikoku, in the Kansai, Tōkai, Tōhoku (seven prefectures) and Chūgoku regions, and portions of the Kantō region. The EEW broadcast network has covered the whole country since 7 December 2010. The SoftBank 831N was the only model supporting EEW in March 2011, although more models had been expected to support the system after summer 2010.

=== Other ===
RC Solution Company developed Yurekuru Call for iPhone, a free iPhone application to receive EEW which is distributed on the Apple App Store; the application is also available for Android. Notification of an EEW might be delayed or blocked if communication lines are congested. The Japanese version of iOS 5 for iPhone has built-in EEW functionality.

=== Radio ===
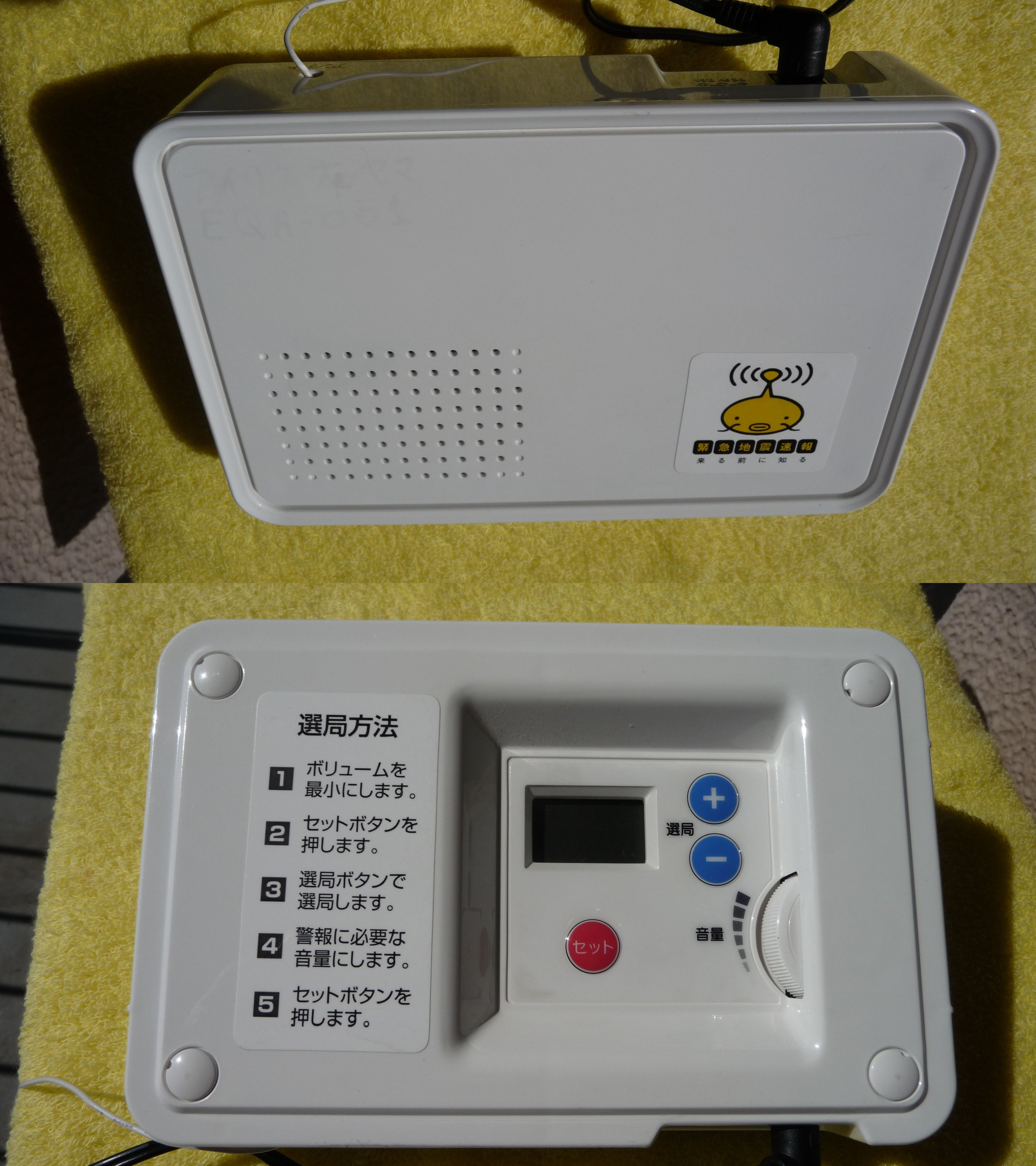
Iris Ohyama EQA-001 FM EEW radio, front (upper) and rear views (lower) Power supply with AC all the time, not battery, and quiet. When earthquake is detected by Japan Meteorological Agency, this radio sounds alarm and message loudly.

A specific, common chime tone from FM stations is automatically detected and turns on the radio (if in sleep mode), sounding a loud chime and broadcasting an EEW message before the quake begins by detecting S-waves. When the S-wave has been analyzed, detailed information on the earthquake (such as seismic scale and areas under threat) is announced.

The following radios receive EEWs from radio stations and are free of information or connection fees:

- Iris Ohyama EQA-001 supports this subject the Earthquake Early Warning (Japan) (EEW) (ja:緊急地震速報, Kinkyū Jishin Sokuhō)
- Iris Ohyama EQA-101 supports this subject the Earthquake Early Warning (Japan) (EEW) (ja:緊急地震速報, Kinkyū Jishin Sokuhō)
- Uniden EWR200 supports EEW and the Emergency Warning Broadcast System (ja:緊急警報放送, Kinkyū Keihō Hōsō)
- P2PQuake (P2P地震情報, P2P Jishin Jōhō) recognizes NHK Radio 1 announcers.

EEW broadcasts can be received in areas without broadband Internet access. Signal quality, speed and service area may vary from station to station.

==== Stations ====
- NHK AM, nationwide
- JOGV-FM (bayfm78), Chiba
- JOAU-FM (Tokyo FM), Tokyo
- JOAV-FM (J-Wave), Tokyo

=== Cable television ===
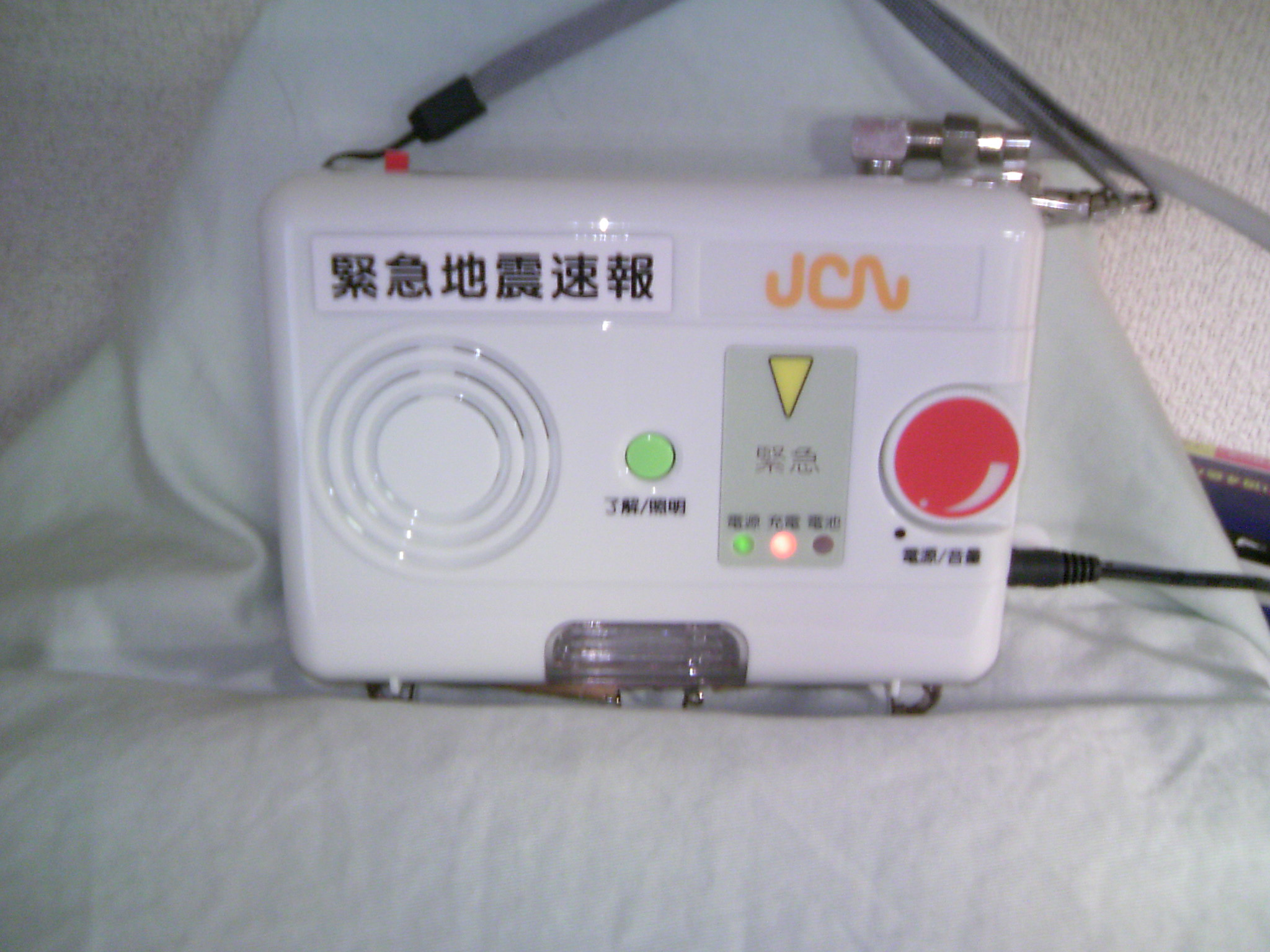
Rental JCN EEW receiver for Funabashi-Narashino

Japanese cable TV stations offer EEWs. Japan Cablenet (ジャパンケーブルネット) (JCN) rents a receiver which notifies the user of the estimated Shindo scale and the time remaining (0 to 5 seconds). Some cable-TV stations also broadcast EEWs on FM community radio stations and provide free equipment to prefecture and municipal facilities.

=== Internet ===
Weathernews Inc., a weather-information company, began a paid EEW service (The Last 10 Seconds) on October 15, 2007. The service requires a computer running Windows 2000 or later with an always-on connection to the Internet. The EEW application can be configured to receive information on earthquakes with a JMA magnitude of 3.5 or higher or with a seismic intensity of 3 or higher. Newer versions of the program allow for the announcement of lower-intensity earthquakes. The program announces the approximate location of the epicenter, the expected JMA seismic intensity and displays a countdown to expected major shaking.

ANET (アネット), a disaster-prevention technology company which is part of the Railway Technical Research Institute Group, released an application (EQMessenger) to receive ANET Alert on 7 July 2008. This deciphers and broadcasts EEW information on the epicenter, the estimated seismic intensity at the user's location, and the time remaining before the arrival of the S-wave. When the estimated seismic intensity exceeds the preset level, EQMessenger can sound a warning and display the epicenter, intensity estimation and the arrival of the tremor on a pop-up map.

A similar, free Windows program, SignalNow Express, was made available by the Strategy Corporation (ストラテジー株式会社) after the 2011 Tōhoku earthquake.

A free multi-platform program, that works on Windows, Mac, and Linux, JQuake, was released on February 14, 2020 as an inspiration to another program called Kiwi Monitor. JQuake tracks information in real-time, and reports any tsunami events that occur. A Scratch-based program available on the web provides detailed earthquake and tsunami information quickly.

== Visual identity ==
The Earthquake Early Warning logo used by the Japan Meteorological Agency is a Namazu (鯰). Many earthquake-preparedness activities in Japan use the catfish as a mascot; in Japanese mythology earthquakes were caused by a giant catfish, or seeing catfish foretold an earthquake.

== History ==
The Earthquake Early Warning service began on 1 October 2007.

After the 2011 Tōhoku earthquake and tsunami, the EEW system and Japan's tsunami warning system were considered effective. Although the tsunami killed over 10,000 people, it is believed that the casualties would have been much higher without the EEW system. In April 2011, the Chilean Subsecretary of Telecommunications said that their country hoped to establish a similar early-warning system.

== See also ==
- Earthquake warning system
- Earthquake prediction
- Emergency Warning Broadcast System (Japan)
- J-Alert
- Cell Broadcast
- Specific Area Message Encoding
- Weather radio
- ShakeAlert
