= Japan Meteorological Agency =

National meteorological service of Japan

- Kishō-chō (気象庁)
- Logo

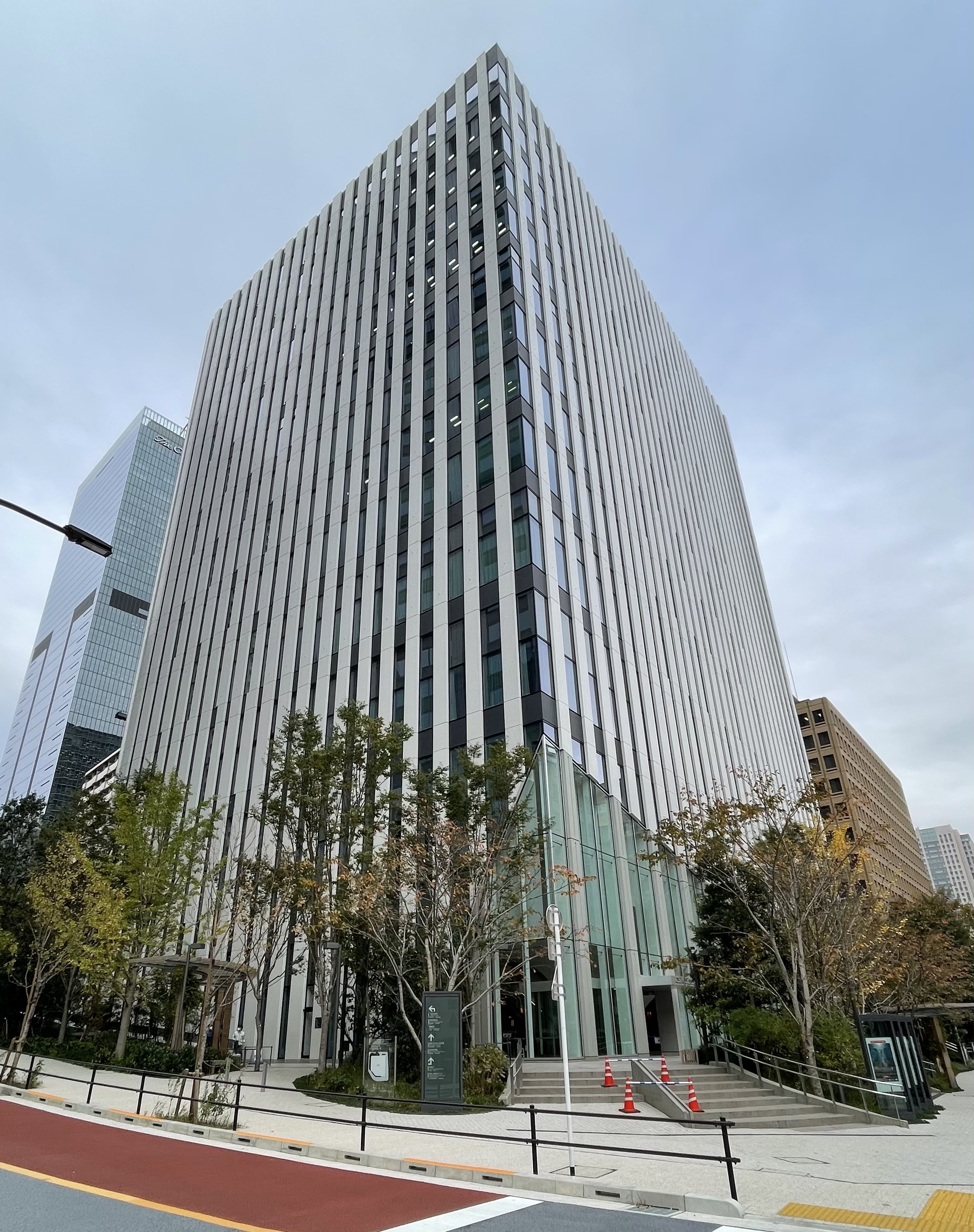
- Headquarters building in Tokyo

Agency overview
- Formed: July 1, 1956; 70 years ago
- Preceding agencies: Tokyo Meteorological Observatory; Central Meteorological Observatory
- Jurisdiction: Government of Japan
- Headquarters: 3-6-9 Toranomon, Minato City, Tokyo, Japan; 35°39′57″N 139°44′45″E
- Employees: 5,539 (2010)
- Annual budget: ¥62.0 billion (2010–11) ¥59.0 billion (2011–12) ¥58.9 billion (est. 2012)
- Agency executives: Toshihiko Hashida, Director-General; Itaru Kaga, Deputy Director-General
- Parent agency: Ministry of Land, Infrastructure, Transport and Tourism
- Website: jma.go.jp

The Japan Meteorological Agency (Japanese: 気象庁, Hepburn: Kishō-chō; JMA) is a division of the Ministry of Land, Infrastructure, Transport and Tourism dedicated to the scientific observation and research of natural phenomena. Headquartered in Minato, Tokyo, the agency collects data on meteorology, hydrology, seismology, volcanology, and other related fields.

The JMA is responsible for collecting and disseminating weather data and forecasts to the public, as well as providing specialized information for aviation and marine sectors. Additionally, the JMA issues warnings for volcanic eruptions and is integral to the nationwide Earthquake Early Warning (EEW) system. As one of the Regional Specialized Meteorological Centers designated by the World Meteorological Organization (WMO), the JMA also forecasts, names, and distributes warnings for tropical cyclones in the Northwestern Pacific region. This includes areas such as the Celebes Sea, the Sulu Sea, the South China Sea, the East China Sea, the Yellow Sea, the Sea of Japan, and the Sea of Okhotsk.

== History ==
Meteorological organizations in Japan have their origins in the 1870s, when the first weather stations started being established in the country. One of these was the Tokyo Meteorological Observatory (東京気象台, Tōkyō Kishō-dai), which since 1956 has been known as the Japan Meteorological Agency (気象庁, Kishō-chō). It was originally formed within the Survey Division of the Geography Bureau of the Home Ministry (内務省地理寮量地課, Naimu-shō Chiri-ryō Ryōchi-ka). However, jurisdiction over the agency has changed several times over the years, and since the Japanese government reformation in 2001, it has been an agency of the Ministry of Land, Infrastructure, Transport and Tourism (国土交通省, Kokudo-kōtsū-shō). Its headquarters have also changed several times, and as of November 24, 2020, they are now located in Toranomon, Minato, Tokyo.

== Timeline ==
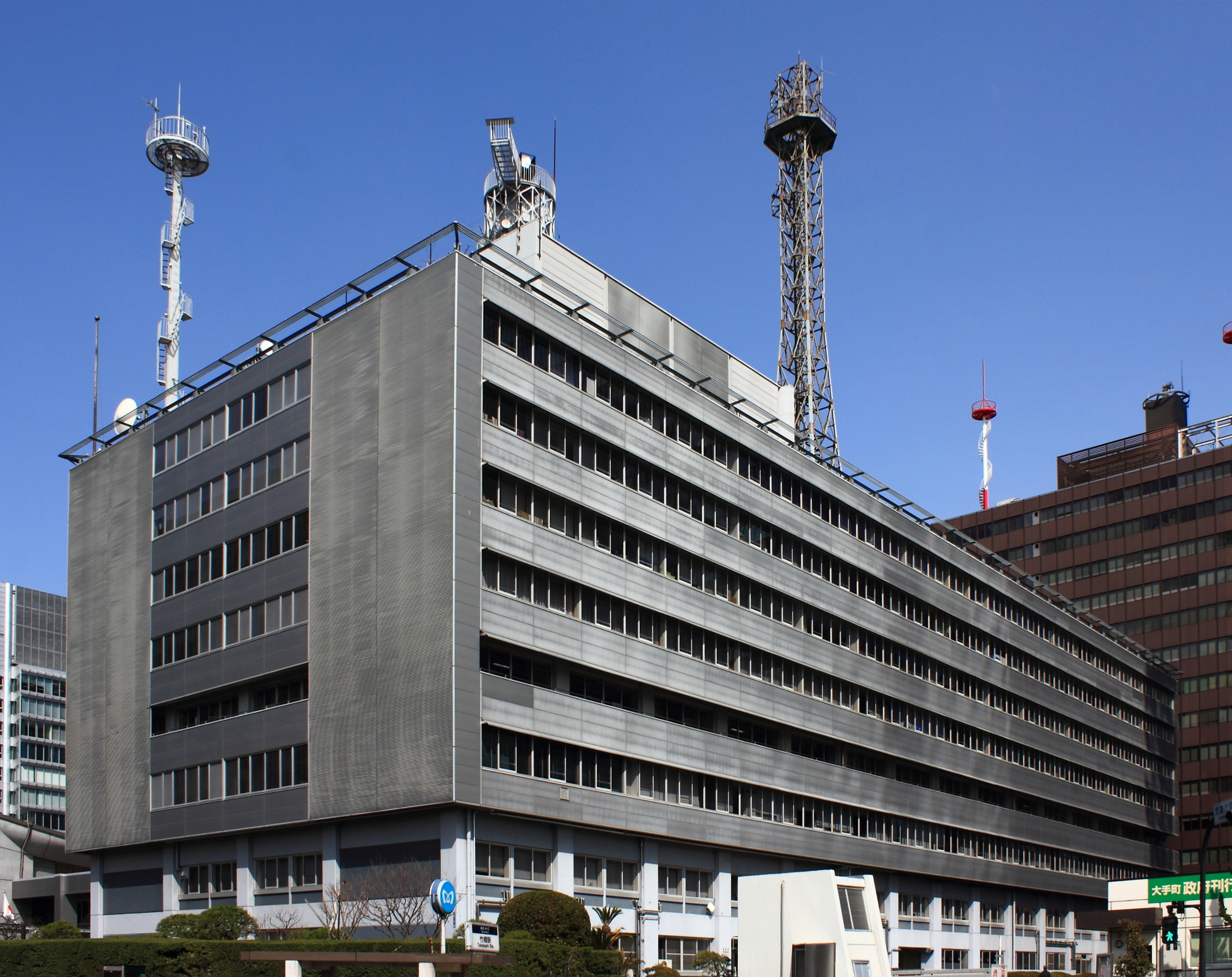
JMA headquarters in Ōtemachi (1964–2020)

- August 26, 1872 – The first weather station in Japan was set up in Hakodate, Hokkaido. It is the precursor of the present Hakodate Weather Station (函館海洋気象台, Hakodate Kaiyō Kishō-dai).
- June 1875 – The original Tokyo Meteorological Observatory (東京気象台, Tōkyō Kishō-dai) was formed within the Survey Division of the Geography Bureau of the Home Ministry (内務省地理寮量地課, Naimu-shō Chiri-ryō Ryōchi-ka).
- January 1, 1887 – The Tokyo Meteorological Observatory was renamed as the Central Meteorological Observatory (中央気象台, Chūō Kishō-dai), with the transfer of its jurisdiction to the Home Ministry.
- April 1895 – The Ministry of Education (文部省, Monbushō) replaced the preceding ministry as an administrator of the Observatory.
- January 1, 1923 – The main office was moved to Motoe-machi, Kōjimachi-ku (later Takehira-chō 1). it is located near a moat surrounding the Imperial Palace.
- November 1943 – The Ministry of Transport and Communications (運輸通信省, Un'yu Tūshin-shō) took over Central Meteorological Observatory operation.
- May 1945 – JMA became part of the Ministry of Transport (運輸省, Un'yu-shō).
- July 1, 1956 – The Central Meteorological Observatory became an agency of the Ministry of Transport, and has been renamed to the Japan Meteorological Agency (気象庁, Kishō-chō).
- March 1964 – The headquarters office was relocated to Ōtemachi, Chiyoda-ku.
- January 6, 2001 – The JMA became an agency of the Ministry of Land, Infrastructure, Transport and Tourism (国土交通省, Kokudo-kōtsū-shō) with the Japanese government reformation.
- 2013 – It was announced that it would be scheduled to move the headquarters into Toranomon, Minato-ku.
- November 24, 2020 - JMA moved to its new headquarters in Toranomon, Minato-ku.

== Services ==
=== Overview ===
The JMA is responsible for observing, gathering and reporting weather data and forecasts, and warning for earthquakes, tsunamis, typhoons and volcanic eruptions.

The agency has six regional administrative offices (including five DMOs and Okinawa Meteorological Observatory), four Marine Observatories, five auxiliary facilities, four Aviation Weather Service Centers and 47 local offices composed of the LMOs. These are also used to gather data, supplemented by weather satellites such as Himawari, and other research institutes.

In 1968, the World Meteorological Organization (WMO) designated the JMA as a Regional Specialized Meteorological Centre (RSMC) for Asia. In June 1988, the WMO also assigned the JMA as a RSMC for the Northwestern Pacific under its Tropical Cyclone programme. In July 1989, the RSMC Tokyo – Typhoon Center was established within the headquarters office, which dealt with the forecasting and dissemination of active tropical cyclones, as well as preparing a summary of each year's cyclone activity.

=== Observation and forecast ===
==== Weather ====
===== Land weather =====
Each DMO and LMO issues weather forecasts and warnings or advisories to the general public live in its own area. Weather data used to these forecasts are acquired from the Surface Observation (represented by the AMeDAS), the Radar Observation, the Observation and the Satellite Observation mainly using the Himawari series of satellites.

===== Marine weather =====
The Marine Observatories are seated in Hakodate, Maizuru, Kobe, Nagasaki. These stations observe ocean waves, tide levels, sea surface temperatures and ocean currents etc. in the Northwestern Pacific basin, as well as the Sea of Japan, the Sea of Okhotsk, and provide marine meteorological forecasts in cooperation with the Hydrographic and Oceanographic Department, Japan Coast Guard.

===== Aviation weather =====
In 2005, in accordance with the ICAO's new CNS/ATM system, the Civil Aviation Bureau of the Ministry of Land, Infrastructure, Transport and Tourism set up the Air Traffic Management Center (ATMC) in Fukuoka, where the FIR is fixed. Along with this establishment, JMA placed the Air Traffic Mateorology Center (ATMetC) inside the ATMC.

The agency forecasts SIGMET for aircraft in flight within the Fukuoka FIR airspace, while VOLMET is broadcast by each Aviation Weather Service Center at the airports of Haneda, Narita, Centrair, and Kansai.

===== Tropical cyclones =====
In the Northwestern Pacific area, the typhoon season ordinarily comes almost from May to November. The JMA forecasts and warns or advises on tropical cyclones to the public in Japan and its surrounding countries as the RSMC Tokyo – Typhoon Center.

==== Earthquakes ====
The JMA has 624 observation stations across Japan which are set up at intervals of 20 km approximately in order to measure the seismic intensity of earthquakes precisely. The agency also utilizes about 2,900 seismographs owned by the National Research Institute for Earth Science and Disaster Resilience (NIED) and local governments. A 24-hour office is housed within the JMA headquarters in Tokyo for monitoring and tracking seismic events in the vicinity of Japan to collect and process their data, which distributes observed earthquake information on its hypocenter, magnitude, seismic intensity and possibility of tsunami occurrence after quakes quickly to the public through the Earthquake Phenomena Observation System (EPOS). The Earthquake Early Warning (EEW) system began to work fully for the general public on October 1, 2007.

The agency is one of the representatives of the national Coordinating Committee for Earthquake Prediction.

==== Tsunamis ====
In case of a possibility of tsunami after an earthquake, JMA issues Tsunami Warning or Advisory for each region in Japan with information of estimated tsunami heights and arrival times within 2 to 3 minutes of the quake.

==== Volcanoes ====
The agency four Volcanic Observations and Information Centers within DMOs in Sapporo, Sendai, Tokyo and Fukuoka. These centers monitor volcanic events on 110 active volcanos in Japan. 47 of these volcanos selected by the Coordinating Committee for Prediction of Volcanic Eruption are under 24-hour observation with seismographs, accelerometers, GPS, air-shock recorders, fixed point observation cameras and other equipment. If it is predicted that a volcanic eruption will affect inhabited areas or around a crater, Volcanic Warnings are issued and supplemented by Volcanic Alert Levels.

== Organization ==
=== Headquarters ===
- JMA Headquarters (気象庁本庁, Kishō-chō Honchō)
- Director-General (長官, Chōkan)
- Deputy Director-General (次長, Jichō)
- Deputy Director-General for Disaster Mitigation (気象防災監, Kishō-Bousaikan)
  - Administration Department (総務部, Sōmu-bu)
    - Counselors (参事官, Sanjikan)
  - Information Infrastructure Department (情報基盤部, Johō-kiban-bu)
  - Atmosphere and Ocean Department (大気海洋部, Taiki-kaiyō-bu)
  - Seismology and Volcanology Department (地震火山部, Jishin-kazan-bu)

=== Local offices ===
- Local Offices (地方支分部局, Chihō Shibun Bukyoku)
  - 6 Regional Headquarters
    - Sapporo Regional Headquarters (札幌管区気象台, Sapporo Kanku Kishō-dai)
      - 6 Local Meteorological Observatories (地方気象台, Chihō Kishō-dai)
      - 1 Weather Station (測候所, Sokkōjo)
      - 1 Aviation Weather Station (航空測候所, Kōkū Sokkōjo)
    - Sendai Regional Headquarters (仙台管区気象台, Sendai Kanku Kishō-dai)
      - 5 Local Meteorological Observatories (地方気象台, Chihō Kishō-dai)
      - 1 Aviation Weather Station (航空測候所, Kōkū Sokkōjo)
    - Tokyo Regional Headquarters (東京管区気象台, Tokyo Kanku Kishō-dai)
      - 16 Local Meteorological Observatories (地方気象台, Chihō Kishō-dai)
      - 3 Aviation Weather Service Centers (航空地方気象台, Kōkū Chihō Kisyō-dai)
    - Osaka Regional Headquarters (大阪管区気象台, Osaka Kanku Kishō-dai)
      - 13 Local Meteorological Observatories (地方気象台, Chihō Kishō-dai)
      - 1 Aviation Weather Service Center (航空地方気象台, Kōkū Chihō Kisyō-dai)
    - Fukuoka Regional Headquarters (福岡管区気象台, Fukuoka Kanku Kishō-dai)
      - 7 Local Meteorological Observatories (地方気象台, Chihō Kishō-dai)
      - 1 Weather Station (測候所, Sokkōjo)
      - 1 Aviation Weather Service Center (航空地方気象台, Kōkū Chihō Kisyō-dai)
    - Okinawa Regional Headquarters (沖縄気象台, Okinawa Kishō-dai)
      - 3 Local Meteorological Observatories (地方気象台, Chihō Kishō-dai)
      - 1 Aviation Weather Station (航空測候所, Kōkū Sokkōjo)

=== Auxiliary organs ===
- Auxiliary Organs (施設等機関, Shisetsu-tō Kikan)
  - Meteorological Research Institute (気象研究所, Kishō Kenkyūjo)
  - Meteorological Satellite Center (気象衛星センター, Kishō-eisei Sentā)
  - Aerological Observatory (高層気象台, Kōsō Kishō-dai)
  - Magnetic Observatory (地磁気観測所, Chijiki Kansokujo)
  - Meteorological College (気象大学校, Kishō Daigakkō)

== Directors-General and Chief Executives ==
=== Chief Executives of Central Meteorological Observatory ===
1. Arai Ikunosuke (荒井 郁之助): 1890–1891
2. Kobayashi Kazutomo (小林 一知): 1891–1895
3. Nakamura Kiyoo (中村 精男): 1895–1923
4. Okada Takematsu (岡田 武松): 1923–1941
5. Fujiwhara Sakuhei (藤原 咲平): 1941–1947
6. Wadachi Kiyoo (和達 清夫): 1947–1956

=== Directors-General of JMA ===
1. Wadachi Kiyoo (和達 清夫): 1956–1963
2. Hatakeyama Hisanao (畠山 久尚): 1963–1965
3. Shibata Yoshiji (柴田 淑次): 1965–1969
4. Yoshitake Motoji (吉武 素二): 1969–1971
5. Takahashi Koūchirō (高橋 浩一郎): 1971–1974
6. Mouri Keitarō (毛利 圭太郎): 1974–1976
7. Arizumi Naosuke (有住 直介): 1976–1978
8. Kubota Masaya (窪田 正八): 1978–1980
9. Masuzawa Jōtarō (増澤 譲太郎): 1980–1983
10. Suehiro Shigeji (末廣 重二): 1983–1985
11. Uchida Eiji (内田 英治): 1985–1987
12. Kikuchi Yukio (菊地 幸雄): 1987–1990
13. Tatehira Ryōzō (立平 良三): 1990–1992
14. Nitta Takashi (新田 尚): 1992–1993
15. Ninomiya Kōzō (二宮 洸三): 1993–1996
16. Ono Toshiyuki (小野 俊行): 1996–1998
17. Takigawa Yūsō (瀧川 雄壮): 1998–2000
18. Yamamoto Kōji (山本 孝二): 2000–2003
19. Kitade Takeo (北出 武夫): 2003–2004
20. Nagasaka Kōichi (長坂 昴一): 2004–2006
21. Hiraki Satoshi (平木 哲): 2006–2009
22. Sakurai Kunio (櫻井 邦雄): 2009–2011
23. Hatori Mitsuhiko (羽鳥 光彦): 2011–2014
24. Nishide Noritake (西出 則武): 2014–2016
25. Hashida Toshihiko (橋田 俊彦): 2016–2019
26. Sekita Yasuo (関田 康雄): 2019–2021
27. Hasegawa Naoyuki (長谷川 直之): 2021–present

== See also ==
- 2026 Pacific typhoon season
- List of Ig Nobel Prize winners
- Severe weather terminology (Japan)
