= Emergency Warning Broadcast System (Japan) =

Japanese emergency population warning system

Start signal (Type 1 start signal)

Start signal (Type 2 start signal)

End signal (test signal)

Emergency Warning Broadcast System (緊急警報放送, Kinkyū keihō hōsō), abbreviated as EWBS or EWS, is a warning broadcast system in Japan that is performed by automatically turning on the switch of a television/radio receiver in a standby state by using a specific signal.

This is done when a large-scale disaster such as an earthquake occurs or when a tsunami warning is announced, and it is intended to help prevent or mitigate the damage caused by the disaster.
