= Weathernews Inc. =

Japanese weather forecasting company

- Type: Public (K.K)
- Traded as: WNI; TYO: 4825
- Industry: Weather forecasting
- Founded: June 11, 1986; 40 years ago
- Headquarters: Chiba City, Chiba Prefecture, Japan
- Key people: Tomohiro Ishibashi (President); Chihito Kusabiraki (Chairman)
- Website: weathernews.com

Weathernews Inc. (Japanese: 株式会社ウェザーニューズ, Hepburn: Kabushikigaisha Uezānyūzu) (WNI) is a Japanese weather forecasting company, whose headquarters and global center are located in Mihama Ward, Chiba City, Chiba Prefecture. WNI owns Weathernews LiVE, a 24/7 online live stream. With 1,152 employees as of 2024 WNI claims to be the largest privately owned weather company in the world.

== History ==
Hiroyoshi Ishibashi, who served as the representative director and president of the Japanese subsidiary of Ocean Routes (ORCJ), a marine meteorological research company headquartered in the United States, expanded the company's land and aviation divisions to 180 million yen with the cooperation of financial institutions. Established in 1986 using a management buy-out method, which was extremely rare at the time, to purchase the company for 10,000 yen (the number of employees at the time of establishment was approximately 40).

The background for its establishment was a maritime accident in January 1970 when a cargo ship sank due to a bomb cyclone that hit Onahama Port, killing 15 people. Because it was difficult to predict weather conditions and there was no weather information available for sailors, Ishibashi took this accident as an opportunity to improve weather information, saying, "If there was really useful weather information, this accident could have been prevented".

In addition to being a pioneer in the private comprehensive weather forecasting service in Japan, in 1993 it merged with its parent company, Ocean Routes, and became the world's largest private weather information company and multinational company.

Weathernews was founded in 1986, but including its predecessor ORCJ and its predecessor Pacific Weather Analysis Corporation (PWAC, founded in 1953). It has a history of 72 years (as of 2025). PWAC is a company that provides weather route information to ships sailing in the Pacific Ocean, and is the world's first private weather information company.

In April 1983 it started providing weather information to Asahi Broadcasting (currently Asahi Broadcasting Group Holdings) becoming the first weather service provider other than the Japan Weather Association (JWA) to provide weather forecasts to a broadcasting station. This included providing cloud images for television from Japan's first meteorological satellite Himawari. In October 1991 it provided the world's first weather forecast using entirely 3D CGI graphics to News Station (TV Asahi). In 1993 it produced a program for TV Tokyo, Weather Paradise. A dedicated weather channel produced by Weathernews started on PerfecTV! in October 1996.

On December 19, 2006, the Nintendo Wii released the "Forecast Channel", which made use of Weathernews' website as its main content provider. By connecting to the internet via WiiConnect24, the channel would show direct weather forecasts, the day's current temperature, and other information once the channel had started up. It would also show the current day's forecast and temperature as well on the Home Menu's channel preview. Since the discontinuation of WiiConnect24 on June 28, 2013, the Forecast Channel cannot connect to Weathernews' servers, rendering the channel discontinued.

In 2009 WNI started SOLiVE24, an internet streaming mixing weather forecasts with some variety programming (with some technical involvement by Fuji TV for its launch), which evolved into Weathernews LiVE, a more straight-forward weather service with some entertainment segments, in 2018. Also in 2009 WNI launched their own mobile app, initially named "Weathernews Touch" for iOS; the app would be renamed "Weathernews" in 2019, available for both iOS and Android; the WNI app's main competitors include JWA's tenki.jp, Yahoo! Japan's own weather app and NHK's News and Disaster Preparedness app. A global version of the WNI app, available in 57 languages, was released worldwide August 2026.

== Global presence ==
Besides the global centre in Chiba (Japan), WNI maintains service centres in Oklahoma (United States), Copenhagen (Denmark), Amsterdam (Netherlands) and Paris (France), and operating centres in Manila (Philippines) and Yangon (Myanmar). It also keeps sales and marketing offices in the aforementioned locations plus Seoul, Shanghai, Taipei, Hong Kong, Bangkok, Hanoi, Singapore, Jakarta, Kathmandu, New Delhi, Kuala Lumpur, London, Athens, Milan, New York and São Paulo.

== See also ==
- Weathernews LiVE, an internet television channel
