= Free ad-supported streaming television =

Category of streaming TV services

Free ad-supported streaming television (occasionally, free ad-supported television, commonly abbreviated as FAST) is a category of streaming television offered without a paid subscription, funded exclusively by advertising akin to free-to-air TV stations. It includes a combination of traditional linear television programming ("live TV"), on-demand programming, live broadcasts (e.g. sporting events), and studio-produced movies.

Platforms following this model include Pluto TV, Rakuten TV (in Japan and many European countries, with U.S. to follow in late 2026), The Roku Channel, Samsung TV Plus, Tubi, and Xumo. These services stand apart from platforms predominantly featuring user-generated content (like YouTube and Twitch), as well as from subscription-based services (like Amazon Prime Video and Netflix). The term was coined by Alan Wolk to differentiate the category in a December 2018 article in TVREV.

== Platforms ==
The FAST ecosystem has different layers. The best-known FASTs are the aggregators, which fall into three categories.

- FASTs owned by major media companies by every country: Skydance's Pluto TV, Fox's Tubi, Charter Communications and Comcast's Xumo Play, Dish Network's Sling Freestream, ITV’s ITVX service (UK), Grupo Silvio Santos's +SBT (Brazil), NEW ID's BINGE Korea, Allen Media Group's Local Now, along Gray Television with National Association of Broadcasters and Syncbak's Zeam.
- FASTs owned by device manufacturers: The Roku Channel, Samsung TV Plus, LG Channels, Vizio WatchFree+, Sony's Live TV on PS5, and TCL Electronics' TCL Channel.
- Independent FASTs: Plex, Fawesome, Distro TV, and Flixhouse.

These aggregators operate primarily in the United States as of 2025, though some, like Pluto TV, Plex, and Samsung TV Plus operate in additional regions or worldwide.

In addition to aggregator apps, there are FASTs run by a single provider such as Scripps' news division, PocketWatch and FilmRise that also provide their content for use in linear channels on the aggregator apps.

== Content and channels ==
Content on FAST services can potentially cover all television genres as well as films, which are the most popular type of content on the FASTs. Content options can include original and/or archive programming not available through subscription streaming services. Although many FAST channels resemble traditional cable specialty channels, others may have an even narrower focus on a single program or media franchise (such as Cops, Baywatch, Unsolved Mysteries, or the American version of Fear Factor). Such single-franchise channels are usually only practical for shows and franchises with an exceptionally large library of episodes; whereas only 65 to 100 episodes are required for traditional broadcast syndication, a 24-hour FAST channel may require 500 episodes.

While some linear FAST channels are exclusive to specific platforms, others, such as Ion Television and Ion Plus are distributed through several providers. Such shared channels may include different content and presentation, or may feature less or more total commercials depending on the provider. Linear channels that are carried both on subscription multichannel television and on FAST services usually have various program lineups for each, effectively creating a freemium model; Newsmax TV, which previously carried the same content on both feeds, downgraded its FAST feed to "Newsmax2," with reduced content, to allow the multichannel service to collect retransmission fees from providers and regain leverage it had lost in carriage disputes by offering its main feed free. FASTs owned by major media companies have the advantage of being able to leverage their parent companies' archival libraries.

Variety estimated that 1,455 linear channels were available through major FAST platforms as of June 2022. By May 2024, that number had risen to 1,943.

== Growing popularity ==
As per Nielsen's monthly streaming ratings for the US market, dubbed "The Gauge", three of the FAST services were in the Top 10 of all streaming services in 2023. In the September 2023 ratings, Tubi, with 1.3% of viewing, ranked fifth among all streaming services, The Roku Channel, with 1.1% ranked seventh, and Pluto TV, with 0.8% ranked tenth. Tubi noted in January 2025 that only 5% of its viewership came from the live streaming channels section of the Tubi app, which emphasizes its on-demand offerings more than its live linear-oriented competitors do. Tubi's decision to simulcast Super Bowl LIX with its corporate sister Fox drew 13.6 million viewers, over 10% of the overall viewership, contributing to that event becoming the most-watched event in American television history despite a purported boycott against the game.

In January 2024, over 1,500 FAST TV channels are currently in airing in the U.S. across various services.

As FAST services have matured, consumer demand has led them to offer a combination of on-demand and linear channels. The idea is that consumers may start watching a series on a linear channel but then want to be able to binge watch it from the start. As rights deals have been renegotiated, the arrangement is becoming more and more common.

== FAST history ==
While the FAST model is distinct from local broadcast retransmission, early cloud-based services like Aereo (backed by Barry Diller and launched in 2012) shared similar characteristics by streaming local broadcast TV channels to users in real-time. In 2014, the U.S. Supreme Court ruled in American Broadcasting Cos., Inc. v. Aereo, Inc. that the service violated the Copyright Act by performing copyrighted works publicly without a license.

Pluto TV, launched in 2014, is widely cited as the first dedicated FAST platform. Unlike Aereo, Pluto TV operated on a licensed model, providing linear "channels" of content. Its growth was accelerated by a 2015 distribution partnership with Hulu—which brought premium free content like Seinfeld and current-season broadcast hits to the platform—and its subsequent acquisition by Viacom (now Skydance Corporation) in 2019. The success of Pluto TV led to hardware-integrated services, such as Samsung TV Plus, which launched in 2015 as a pre-installed feature on Samsung Smart TVs.

In 2016, LocalBTV launched the second local TV streaming platform which they positioned as a free "virtual-over-the-air" (vOTA) platform for streaming properly licensed local broadcast stations. Unlike Aereo, that faced legal challenges, LocalBTV secured explicit permission from broadcasters for simultaneous delivery in a geo-fenced DMA. In 2021, LocalBTV introduced targeted Dynamic Ad Replacement (DAR) to its streams, allowing local broadcasters to replace traditional over-the-air ads with targeted Ads. LocalBTV also expanded the FAST model by introducing "hyper-local" Community Video channels that are not in the traditional broadcast lineup.

While Pluto TV focused on linear viewing, other free ad-supported services like Tubi (acquired by Fox Corporation in 2020) initially focused on Video on Demand (VOD). Later in the 2020s, the distinction blurred as many platforms integrated both linear channels and VOD libraries.
