= Xfinity Flex =

American internet television service

- Company type: Subsidiary
- Industry: Pay television
- Founded: September 2017; 8 years ago
- Headquarters: United States
- Services: OTT Internet television
- Parent: Comcast
- Website: www.xfinity.com/learn/flex

Xfinity Flex (formerly Xfinity Instant TV) is an American over-the-top internet television service owned by Comcast. The service – which is structured as a virtual multichannel video programming distributor – is only available to Comcast Xfinity internet customers. It is designed as an alternative to other competing OTT skinny bundles for cord cutters, offering a selection of major cable channels and on-demand content that can be streamed through smart TVs, digital media players, and mobile apps.

== Supported devices ==
Supported Xfinity Stream TV devices include:

=== TV-connected ===
- Amazon Fire TV
- Roku
- Apple TV
- Samsung Smart TV
- Chromecast

=== Mobile ===
- Android mobile devices
- Apple iOS mobile devices

=== Computer ===
- macOS
- Windows

== See also ==
- Xfinity
- DirecTV Stream
- FuboTV
- HBO Now
- LocalBTV
- Locast
- Now
- Sling TV
- YouTube TV
