= Spectrum TV Stream =

American internet television service

- Type: Subsidiary
- Industry: Pay television
- Founded: March 06, 2017
- Headquarters: Stamford, CT, United States
- Products: Xumo Stream Box
- Services: OTT Internet television
- Parent: Charter Communications
- Website: www.spectrum.com/streamtv.html(Dead link)

Spectrum TV Stream is an American over-the-top internet television service owned by Charter Communications. The service – which is structured as a virtual multichannel video programming distributor – is only available to Charter Spectrum internet customers. It is designed as an alternative to other competing OTT skinny bundles for cord cutters, offering a selection of major cable channels and on-demand content that can be streamed through smart TVs, digital media players, and mobile apps.

== Supported devices ==
Supported Spectrum TV devices include:

=== TV-connected ===
- Apple TV
- Chromecast
- Roku
- Fire TV
- Firestick
- Google TV
- Samsung Smart TV
- Xbox One
- Xbox Series https://iptvserviceinfo.com/X/S
- Xumo

=== Mobile ===
- Android mobile devices
- Apple iOS mobile devices (including iPhones and iPads)

=== Computer ===
- macOS
- Windows

== See also ==
- Spectrum
- DirecTV Stream
- FuboTV
- LocalBTV
- Now
- PlayStation Vue
- Sling TV
- YouTube TV
