= YouTube TV =

American subscription streaming TV service

- Logo used since 2024
- Website type: OTT platform
- Headquarters: 901 Cherry Avenue, San Bruno, California, United States
- Area served: United States
- Industry: Pay television
- Services: Streaming television
- Parent: Google (through YouTube)
- Website: tv.youtube.com
- Users: ▲10,000,000 subscribers (as of November 7, 2025)
- Launched: April 5, 2017; 9 years ago

YouTube TV is an American subscription over-the-top streaming television service operated by Google through its subsidiary YouTube. Launched in 2017, the virtual multichannel video programming distributor offers a selection of live linear channel feeds and on-demand content from more than 100 television networks (including affiliates of the Big Three broadcast networks (such as ABC, NBC and CBS), Fox, The CW and PBS in most markets) and over 30 OTT-originated services, as well as a cloud-based DVR.

The service, which is aimed at cord cutters, is available exclusively in the United States, and can be streamed through its dedicated website and mobile app, smart TVs and digital media players. As of November 7, 2025, YouTube TV has over 10 million subscribers.

== History ==
=== 2017–2018 ===
YouTube TV launched on April 5, 2017, in five major U.S. markets—New York City, Los Angeles, Chicago, Philadelphia and San Francisco. In addition to carrying national broadcast networks, YouTube TV offers cable-originated channels owned by the corporate parents of the four major networks and other media companies. Other channels initially available on the service included CNBC and MSNBC (owned by Comcast through NBCUniversal), BBC World News (owned by the BBC), Smithsonian Channel (owned by Paramount Skydance), Sundance TV and BBC America (owned by AMC Networks), numerous sports channels, Disney Channel (owned by The Walt Disney Company).

YouTube TV members also received access to YouTube Premium’s original movies and series, though an additional subscription to Premium was required for customers to access ad-free content and additional app features; Showtime and Fox Soccer Plus were also purchasable as optional premium add-ons for an extra fee. Also in 2017, YouTube added MLB Network, and entered into regional streaming rights deals with two Major League Soccer clubs, Seattle Sounders FC and Los Angeles FC.

In February 2018, YouTube TV began carrying the Time Warner–owned Turner Broadcasting System's cable networks (including, among others, TBS, TNT, CNN and Cartoon Network). In addition, YouTube TV also announced a deal to add NBA TV and MLB Network. With these additional channels, the service increased its monthly price for the first time in March 2018, from $34.99 to $39.99, with no grandfathering or opt-out available. On June 19, 2018, under an agreement with Lionsgate, YouTube TV began offering Starz as a premium add-on, containing linear feeds of the six Starz and eight Starz Encore channels.

=== 2019–2020 ===
The service expanded to cover 98% of U.S. households by January 2019. In March 2019, YouTube TV launched in Glendive, Montana, thus making the service available in all 210 American television markets. On April 10, 2019, YouTube TV added nine networks owned by Discovery, Inc. (including Discovery Channel, HGTV, Food Network, TLC, Animal Planet and OWN), were not absent after streamer's launch, bringing the service's lineup up to 70 channels. The service concurrently announced a second monthly price increase, from $39.99 to $49.99, without grandfathering existing customers or allowing them to opt out. On April 12 of that year, YouTube TV reached an agreement with Metro-Goldwyn-Mayer to offer its Epix (now MGM+) premium service as an add-on.

In July 2019, at the Television Critics Association Summer Press Tour in Pasadena, California, YouTube TV announced it had signed a multi-year deal with PBS to allow carriage of live streams of the public broadcaster's member stations and PBS Kids Channel beginning as early as the fourth quarter of 2019. On December 15, 2019, the first PBS affiliate stations were added to YouTube TV. On February 20, 2020, YouTube TV reached an agreement with WarnerMedia (now Warner Bros. Discovery) to carry HBO and Cinemax as add-ons, and allowing access to the conglomerate's HBO Max streaming service, which launched on May 20 of that year, with a containing HBO subscription. (Customers who subscribe to the HBO add-on can access content within the HBO Max app using their YouTube TV/Google account credentials.) The additions of HBO and Cinemax resulted in YouTube TV becoming the first American vMVPD service to offer all five major premium channels as add-ons.

In May 2020, YouTube TV reached an expanded, multi-year deal with ViacomCBS (now Paramount Skydance) to add the company's major cable networks (including MTV, Nickelodeon, BET and Comedy Central) that were notably absent since the streamer's launch. The deal also entailed a continued commitment to distribute several other ViacomCBS-owned networks, including CBS, Pop, The CW and Showtime, through YouTube TV, along with an extended partnership to distribute the media company's content on the broader YouTube platforms. Eight of the channels were added on June 30, expanding YouTube TV's lineup to over 85 channels. The additions of the extra channels were accompanied by the service's third monthly price increase, from $49.99 to $64.99, which also had no grandfathering or opt-out provisions. Some of its competitors, such as Hulu + Live TV and FuboTV, have also implemented similar price increases over time.

In September 2020, YouTube TV added the NFL Network to its base lineup and announced the launch of a Sports Plus add-on package, which includes premium sports networks such as NFL RedZone, MavTV, GolTV, Fox Soccer Plus, Stadium and TVG for an additional cost. On December 1, 2020, YouTube TV announced an agreement to carry Nexstar Media Group's NewsNation (the former WGN America) beginning in January 2021. On March 16, 2021, YouTube TV announced that seven additional ViacomCBS-owned networks (including MTV2, TeenNick, Nick Jr. Channel, Dabl and BET Her) that were not added as part of the May 7 renewal agreement would be added to the lineup.

=== 2021–2022 ===
In February 2021, the service launched its "Entertainment Plus" add-on, an optional discount bundle (available for $29.99 per month) consisting of the HBO Max, Showtime and Starz premium add-ons. On September 2, 2021, YouTube TV announced that BeIN Sports, Outside TV, VSiN and several other niche sports channels would be added to its Sports Plus add-on tier, effective September 8.

In May 2022, the service launched a secondary Spanish-language base plan aimed at Hispanic and Latino customers, and a complimentary "Spanish Plus" add-on; the "Spanish Plan", available for $34.99 per month, consists of 28 Spanish-language channels (including ESPN Deportes, CNN en Español, Cine Latino, Estrella TV, Nat Geo Mundo and Cine Mexicano), while Spanish Plus, available for $14.99 per month, includes over 25 Spanish-language channels (including several that are offered as part of the main Spanish plan). The Spanish plan—which, unlike the Spanish Plus add-on, does not require a subscription to the main base plan—launched with a seven-day free trial.

In September 2022, YouTube TV began allowing subscribers the option of purchasing its premium add-ons without requiring signing up for the 85-channel base plan (a concept similar to the streaming channel stores operated by Apple, Prime Video and Roku), with around 20 add-ons initially being made available for purchase à la carte, including HBO Max; Cinemax; Showtime; Starz; MGM+; Hallmark Movies Now; CuriosityStream; MLB.tv and NBA League Pass. (YouTube launched a standalone channel store, Primetime Channels, within the platform's Movies & TV hub on November 1 of that year.)

In December 2022, YouTube TV was named the exclusive provider of NFL Sunday Ticket beginning with the 2023 NFL season. YouTube TV replaces DirecTV as the package's provider; DirecTV had carried the package since its 1994 inception, a 29-year run. CNBC characterized this as a win for both YouTube TV as well as traditional television networks. YouTube's chief product officer, Neal Mohan, said this was logical progression given how people consume sports content, and noted that subscriptions were a big part of the service's future. He also noted that "creators [would] have exclusive access to games, everything from the first game all the way through the Super Bowl, so that they can produce content on the NFL channel, but they can also produce their own content for YouTube shorts." At the time of announcement, this move would not affect the NFL Network and RedZone on YouTube. NFL Sunday Ticket officially launched as a standalone add-on on both YouTube TV and YouTube's Primetime Channels store on August 16, 2023.

=== 2023–present ===
On January 31, 2023, YouTube TV notified subscribers that it was dropping MLB Network after the company was unable to reach a new agreement with the channel for continued carriage. In a statement, a spokesperson for the channel said it was simply asking YouTube TV for a deal that was comparable to what around 300 other cable, satellite and streaming companies had agreed to in the past.

On March 16, 2023, YouTube TV increased the price from $64.99 to $72.99 per month for new members, and April 18, 2023, for existing members who subscribed to YouTube TV. The price of some add-on packages, like its 4K feature, was reduced to account for the price increase.

On May 17, 2023, YouTube TV received backlash after a glitch that made many channels unavailable for several hours, including TNT, who were airing an NBA playoff game between the Boston Celtics & Miami Heat. The glitch made subscribers unable to watch the ending of the game. The service received an unexpected boost from a carriage dispute between Disney and Charter Communications in August, in the advent of the college football and NFL season, with many users advising impacted Charter customers to consider switching to YouTube TV.

On December 12, 2023, the separate HBO and HBO Max linear/VOD add-ons were converted into a singular HBO Max offering that—in addition to featuring HBO's live linear feeds and VOD content—includes in-app library access to Max's ad-free tier, and live feeds of the service's streaming channels, CNN Max (offering a mix of programs simulcast from CNN and CNN International) and Bleacher Report (a four-channel, gametime-only service that airs Max-exclusive and Warner Bros. Discovery-owned linear network simulcasts of sports events). (Note: Prior to December 2023, the standalone HBO add-on was sold exclusively to base plan subscribers, while the HBO Max add-on (originally also requiring a base subscription to purchase) had been available for purchase to all subscribers since YouTube TV removed base plan requirements for most add-ons in September 2022.)

On December 10, 2025, Google announced it would introduce a slate of genre-specific channel packages in early 2026. Google did not announce pricing at the time, but packages are expected to cost less than its current base plan.

== Features ==
YouTube TV offers a cloud-based DVR service with unlimited storage that saves recordings for nine months; access to the DVR required a subscription to the service's base channel plan until September 2022, when YouTube TV expanded the feature to subscribers of its premium add-ons who do not have an accompanying subscription to the base package. Each subscription can be shared among six accounts and allows up to three simultaneous streams.

== Supported devices and apps ==
Supported YouTube TV devices include:

=== Smart TVs ===
- Android TV
- Hisense Smart TV
- LG Smart TV (on webOS 3.0 or higher)
- Roku Smart TV (Note: Removed from Roku channel store in April 2021; folded into the main YouTube app in May; re-added to the Roku channel store in December.)
- Samsung Smart TV (2017 & higher models only)
- Sharp Smart TV
- Sony Smart TV
- TCL Smart TV
- Vizio Smartcast
- Walton Smart TV
- Xumo Smart TV

=== Streaming media players ===
- Amazon Fire TV
- Apple TV (4th generation & 4K)
- Chromecast
- Chromecast with Google TV
- Nvidia Shield TV
- Roku Players
- TiVo Stream 4K
- Xumo Stream Box

=== Game consoles ===
- PlayStation 4 (Original model, PS4 Slim, and PS4 Pro)
- PlayStation 5 (Original Base and Digital editions model, PS5 Slim, and PS5 Pro)
- Xbox One (Original model, Xbox One S, Xbox One S All Digital Edition, and Xbox One X)
- Xbox Series (Series S and Series X)

=== Mobile ===
- Android mobile devices
- iOS mobile devices (10.x or higher)

=== Computer ===
- ChromeOS
- Linux
- macOS
- Windows

=== Apps ===
- YouTube (Smart TVs, Streaming media players, and Game consoles only)

== Carriage disputes ==
In February 2020, YouTube TV announced that Sinclair Broadcast Group–owned regional sports networks (including Fox Sports Networks and YES Network) would likely be pulled from the service on February 28, 2020, citing high carriage fees. On that day, YouTube TV announced that it had reached an interim agreement to continue offering the channels on the platform while negotiations are under way. On March 5, 2020, YouTube TV and Sinclair reached a new deal to continue carrying all the Fox RSNs except three – the YES Network, Fox Sports Prime Ticket and Fox Sports West. However, on October 1, 2020, the networks (one of which was carrying the Bally Sports moniker) were pulled off the service after the two sides could not come to a renegotiation agreement. The same month, YouTube TV dropped NESN, which carries games for the Boston Red Sox and the Boston Bruins.

In September 2021, YouTube TV entered into a dispute with NBCUniversal when negotiating a renewal of their contract, with the latter warning that its channels would be removed from the service if they failed to reach an agreement by the end of the month. NBC had reportedly demanded YouTube TV bundle their Peacock streaming service, while YouTube TV announced that it would decrease their price by $10 if the contract is not renewed. The two companies failed to reach an agreement by October 1, but agreed to a "short extension" to avoid the channels being taken down. A deal was reached a day later.

In December 2021, YouTube TV engaged in a dispute with The Walt Disney Company over a renewal in their contract, warning customers about the possible removal of ABC, Disney Channel, ESPN, Freeform, FX, National Geographic, and other Disney-owned networks should the two fail to reach an agreement. Google and Disney were unable to renew their contract by the expiration date, resulting in YouTube TV's first contract-related blackout. This was resolved a day later, with the two companies reaching a new deal.

In January 2023, MLB Network was pulled off YouTube TV after they failed to reach a contract renewal agreement.

On November 18, 2023, Phoenix, Arizona television station KTVK was pulled off YouTube TV as a local channel in the state of Arizona due to a dispute between YouTube TV and KTVK's parent company, Gray Television. This leaves viewers on that service unable to watch the majority of locally televised Phoenix Suns and Phoenix Mercury basketball games not televised by TNT, ESPN, or ABC.

On February 12, 2025, YouTube TV engaged in a dispute with Paramount Global over a renewal in their contract, warning customers about the possible removal of CBS, Nickelodeon, MTV, Paramount+ with Showtime, BET, Comedy Central, and other Paramount-owned networks should the two fail to reach an agreement on February 13. A shutdown would have potentially made 2025 NCAA Division I men's basketball tournament games airing on CBS plus coverage of the Masters Tournament unavailable to YouTube TV subscribers. However, the two sides reached an agreement on the 13th.

On October 30, 2025, Disney pulled its networks from YouTube TV. The dispute was resolved on November 14, 2025, with the service agreeing to carry ESPN's new DTC service (whose content will also be integrated directly into the YouTube TV platform), as well as Disney+ and Hulu on selected plans. In February 2026, Disney announced that it lost $110 million in operating income from the dispute.

== See also ==
- DirecTV Stream
- Frndly TV
- FuboTV
- Hulu with Live TV
- LocalBTV
- Locast
- Pluto TV
- Philo
- PlayStation Vue
- Sling TV
- Spectrum TV Stream
- TVision
- Xfinity Flex
