= PlayStation Vue =

Former American streaming television service

- Type: Subsidiary
- Industry: Pay television
- Founded: March 18, 2015; 11 years ago
- Defunct: January 30, 2020; 6 years ago
- Fate: Discontinued
- Headquarters: San Mateo, California, United States
- Area served: United States
- Services: Streaming television
- Parent: Sony Interactive Entertainment
- Website: web.archive.org/web/20191220162018/https://www.playstation.com/en-us/ps_vue_subscription/

PlayStation Vue (PS Vue) was an American streaming television service that was owned by the Sony Interactive Entertainment subdivision of the Sony Corporation of America division of Sony. Launched with a limited major-market rollout on March 18, 2015, the service – which was structured in the style of a multichannel video programming distributor – combined live TV (incorporating a lineup of various cable-originated television channels), on-demand video, and cloud-based DVR to stream television programs, movies, and sporting events directly to a PlayStation console or other supported device – including smart TVs, digital media players and apps – without a subscription to a cable or satellite television provider. Targeting cord cutters, PlayStation Vue was designed to complement subscription video-on-demand services. As of August 26, 2018, the service had approximately 745,000 subscribers. On October 29, 2019, Sony announced PlayStation Vue would be ending service on January 30, 2020, because "the highly competitive Pay TV industry, with expensive content and network deals, has been slower to change than we expected".

== History ==
Prior to the advent of cord-cutting, Sony had created add-on devices for the PS3 in international markets, specifically the PlayTV in Europe and Australia and the torne in Japan, to allow PS3 users to view live TV through their PS3 consoles and an over-the-air television antenna. However, no such device was created for the PS3 in North America, likely due to less of an interest in antenna-based TV viewing at the time and the fact that either the PlayTV or Torne devices would have to be modified or else a new device created, as to be compatible with North American digital TV signals (which utilize the ATSC standard, as opposed to the DVB-T standard used by the PlayTV or the ISDB-T standard used by the torne).

In a presentation at the Consumer Electronics Show (CES) in Las Vegas on January 7, 2014, Sony Computer Entertainment CEO Andrew House announced that the company was developing a new cloud-based service that would include the "most popular live TV programs combined with a large library of VOD content" from outside streaming services. Neither House nor representatives with Sony Computer Entertainment offered any specifics on these plans.

During the summer and fall of 2014, Sony had reached carriage agreements with various cable channel owners to obtain the over-the-top distribution rights to their networks as part of the planned OTT offering. On September 10, Sony and Viacom announced that they had signed a distribution agreement that would allow the service to provide "at least" 22 linear cable channels at launch, as well as access to on-demand offerings from the channels. On November 5, CBS Corporation and Discovery Communications confirmed in their respective third-quarter earnings reports that Sony had licensed the rights to their cable channels – and in CBS' case, its owned-and-operated broadcast stations – on the planned service. On November 10, while appearing at the RBC Capital Markets 2014 Technology, Internet, Media and Telecommunications Conference in New York City, CBS Corporation CEO Leslie Moonves commented on the offering, saying that "Sony is going to do an offering that's very interesting" with "more bells and whistles" and "more VOD content."

Sony Network Entertainment International and Sony Computer Entertainment formally disclosed the planned service on November 12, 2014, when the subsidiaries jointly announced the launch of PlayStation Vue, an over-the-top television service which "reinvents the television experience," offering live feeds of 75 channels owned by groups as CBS Corporation, Viacom, NBCUniversal, Discovery Communications, Scripps Networks Interactive, Turner Broadcasting System, and 21st Century Fox, along with on-demand content; the service would initially be available for via a built-in app for PlayStation 3 and PlayStation 4 consoles. Sony planned to offer a beta preview of the service to select PS3 and PS4 users on an invitation-only basis starting later that month, although this rollout would be withheld by three months.

PlayStation Vue initially launched on March 18, 2015, in the form of a limited rollout in the major markets of Chicago, Dallas–Fort Worth, Miami, New York City and Philadelphia. Vue reached its first pact with a major premium channel on June 8, when CBS Corporation announced that PlayStation Vue would add Showtime in early July as an à la carte package, consisting of the network's linear east and west coast feeds as well as its standalone over-the-top streaming service (joining Apple and Roku as the latter's launch partners).

On June 15, 2015, in a press conference at the Electronic Entertainment Expo (E3), House announced that PlayStation Vue would become available in Los Angeles and San Francisco beginning that evening, and that the service would become the exclusive launch partner for the linear feed of online video network Machinima, which would be included as part of the Vue Elite tier. The service would also allow PlayStation owners in the rest of the country to purchase select channels on an a la carte basis starting in July, stating that Vue would be "the first paid TV service to allow users to subscribe to individual channels without the purchase of a multi-channel bundle." The available a la carte services initially included Showtime (through an agreement with CBS reached on June 5, 2015, in which PlayStation Vue customers would be able to subscribe to a package that includes the east and west coast linear feeds of the primary Showtime channel, and on demand content from its standalone OTT service), Fox Soccer Plus (available as a standalone sports add-on), Epix Hits and Machinima (both of which would be available as standalone premium packages as well as part of the Elite tier's lineup).

On November 5, Sony announced an agreement with The Walt Disney Company that would allow it to distribute the company's cable channels (which would include among others ESPN and select associated networks, Disney Channel, Disney Junior, Disney XD, ABC Family and Fusion) on PlayStation Vue at an initially undetermined date. The agreement also gave Vue rights to ABC's eight owned-and-operated stations in their respective markets and on-demand content from ABC – through both Vue's VOD offerings and Disney–ABC's TV Everywhere apps that provide access to network content to Vue subscribers via their PlayStation Network email address and password – elsewhere. ABC-affiliated stations owned by other companies were also granted opt-in rights to offer their live linear signals to PlayStation Vue users. The Disney–ABC networks and O&Os were added to the service on March 2, 2016, initially excluding several ESPN networks (such as ESPN3, Longhorn Network, ESPN Goal Line/Buzzer Beater/Bases Loaded and ESPN College Extra), which Sony stated would be added to the service in the future.

On November 12, 2015, PlayStation Vue expanded support to the Amazon Fire TV and Fire TV stick; support for Google Chromecast devices was added the following month on December 15, however, it was limited to iOS users as PS Vue had not yet launched an app for Google's Android operating system.

Sony rolled out PlayStation Vue to the remainder of the United States on March 14, 2016. However, pricing and channel offering would differ for subscribers in the seven initial PS Vue markets and the 203 newly added markets. Because of the business ecosystem of broadcast television, Sony initially limited distribution of linear feeds of the five major broadcast networks (The CW, ABC, CBS, NBC and Fox) to markets where each of the networks has an owned-and-operated station, as it does not automatically have the rights to stream affiliates owned by other broadcasting companies. As a workaround, Sony stated that PlayStation Vue would offer on-demand content from The CW, ABC, Fox, NBC, Telemundo and Univision as a substitute in areas where a local station feed is not available, with new episodes of their series being made available the day after their initial broadcast; on-demand access to CBS programs would become available in select markets at an unspecified later date. Upon adding owned-and-operated stations of ABC, NBC, CBS and Fox located outside the service's initial markets on May 25, 2016, Sony representatives stated that the company intended to reach carriage deals with the independently owned station groups to provide their live signals for PS Vue, stating that it would "continue to work on adding more local stations nationwide."

Sony expanded its relationship with Time Warner and PS Vue's premium channel offerings on September 15, 2016, through an agreement that added HBO and Cinemax to the service as separate add-on packs. As part of this agreement, the first in which either channel's linear feeds would become available directly to consumers without requiring a bundled programming tier, PlayStation Vue customers who subscribe to HBO would automatically have access to the network's companion over-the-top service, HBO Now, which is usually offered as a standalone subscription without need of a television provider (as opposed to the similarly structured HBO Go, which is strictly offered through traditional cable and satellite providers as a TV Everywhere offering); support for HBO Now would initially be restricted to PlayStation 4 consoles for new and existing subscribers of that service. HBO and Cinemax were added to PlayStation Vue – with both packages consisting solely of the east and west coast feeds of their respective primary linear channels and HBO Now, but exempting the respective HBO and Cinemax multiplex channels – on September 30, 2016. On that date, the service also launch a fourth programming package, Ultra, a high-end tier that includes the east and west coast feeds of HBO and Showtime.

On July 26, 2016, Sony and NFL Media announced an agreement to distribute the NFL Network and NFL RedZone on the service. On November 8, Sony announced that PlayStation Vue would stop carrying / dropping all channels owned by Viacom Media Networks effective November 11, in order to reduce programming costs to maintain the existing pricing of its tiers. It also announced the addition of three channels: BBC America and NBA TV starting the following day on November 9, and Viceland at an unspecified later date. Two months later on January 25, 2017, PlayStation Vue announced it would move the Esquire Network to its "Elite" package, in advance of the network's planned shutdown that spring. On March 21, 2017, PlayStation Vue added the MLB Network to its Core package. As of May 1, 2018, PlayStation Vue has stopped carrying all 193 Sinclair Broadcast Group-owned ABC, CBS, NBC, FOX and CW stations in certain TV markets for undisclosed reasons. The Sinclair stations were restored to the service later in the year.

It was reported on October 24, 2019, that Sony was looking to sell the Vue service. Days later on October 29, it was reported that the service would be discontinued on January 30, 2020.

An exploit for the PS4 utilizing the PlayStation Vue app was discovered in early 2026. On February 7 it was released into the public domain.

== Features and availability ==
PlayStation Vue was not necessarily designed as a substitute for a "traditional" pay television provider, but as a complement to subscription-based online services (such as Hulu, Vudu, and Netflix) and broadcast television. In an interview with The Wall Street Journal, PlayStation Vue senior director of business management and content Amit Nag said that the service would be "going after the PlayStation user who is today not watching TV and driving a large ratings decline[,] and is at high risk" for abandoning the ecosystem of traditional subscription television in favor of services such as Hulu, Vudu and Netflix.

Initial activation of PlayStation Vue (including setting the "home" location) and required profile creation could only be performed with a "supported, TV-connected device" (PlayStation 3 or 4, Roku, Amazon Fire TV, Android TV, PC or Mac) with Internet access. Activation and required profile creation with mobile or Chromecast was not supported. Activation through the PlayStation website could not work if third-party cookies had been blocked in the web browser. Packages were billed on a monthly basis and could be canceled at any time. No contract was required to subscribe, and a free one-week trial was offered to any user who would normally be able to access the service who have not previously redeemed a trial. The monthly rate was charged to the viewer's credit card if the service was not canceled before the end of the trial period.

For contractual reasons, the service was accessible only within the Continental United States (excluding its territories). In addition, some sports telecasts – particularly NFL and NCAA college football games – were subject to blackout based on market restrictions imposed by sports leagues and collegiate athletic conferences (this included events carried on major broadcast networks that were not available on the service in markets where an affiliate had granted clearance, although some game telecasts that had not been available live on PlayStation Vue were accessible via authentication to a TV Everywhere app using a PlayStation Network ID). PlayStation Vue users were restricted from accessing the service through their own credentials on PlayStation consoles and other TV-connected devices outside the location where their subscription was activated, as defined by the IP address used upon their initial sign-in to the PS Vue service; attempts to stream PlayStation Vue content on consoles outside the designated "home" location may subject a subscriber to being blocked from accessing the service through their account. Such out-of-home access restrictions do not apply to supported iOS, Android and Google Chromecast devices, and mobile web browsers.

PlayStation Vue featured video on demand ("VOD") content, including catch-up programming from the channels carried on the service and content provided by over-the-top services operated by individual networks; an alternative VOD channel featuring content from each of the major broadcast networks was available as a substitute for a local station in certain markets. Vue also offered Cloud DVR functionality, which allowed users to automatically save and store recorded content for 28 days after their recording to the "My Shows" app and sort them to a personalized list; both VOD and DVR content were subject to availability by channel, program and location, particularly content from many CBS-affiliated stations that could not be stored to the "My DVR" or "My Shows" apps due to contractual streaming restrictions. Some PlayStation Vue live content and Cloud DVR recordings of content saved in the "My Shows" app were restricted from being accessed on mobile devices (including Chromecast), even if the user uses their home network.

On March 6, 2017, the service introduced the "Multi-View" picture-in-picture feature, which allowed users to watch up to three channels simultaneously on a single screen; the feature was initially available only to PlayStation 4 users, though it was expected to be rolled out to additional platforms in the near future. Concurrent with that announcement, Sony also revealed that it would introduce a score alert feature, which provided recurring updates on sports events currently being held and airing on channels carried by PS Vue; the feature would include an option for the alerts to be turned off while the user still watching a game in progress.

== Content ==
Around the time of its March 2015 soft launch, Sony announced that it had reached agreements with many major content providers to supply channels for PlayStation Vue's lineup, including The Walt Disney Company, Discovery Networks, Fox Corporation, NBCUniversal, AMC Networks, WarnerMedia, ViacomCBS, and Metro-Goldwyn-Mayer.

As of October 2016, the channels of A&E Networks (including A&E, Lifetime, LMN and History Channel among others), The CW, member stations of PBS and its associated networks, Univision (along with its Univision Communications-owned sister broadcast and cable channels, outside Fusion), and some independent stations had yet to reach agreements with Sony to make their programming available on PlayStation Vue. However, Univision content could be accessed by PS Vue users through the network's in-house over-the-top service, Univision Now. The CW programming on the network's Chicago affiliate, WPWR-TV (which assumed the affiliation from WGN-TV on September 1, 2016), was blacked out on WPWR; all other programming carried on WPWR to which Vue held streaming rights – including those supplied through its MyNetworkTV affiliation – was carried unobstructed.

Upon adding the owned-and-operated stations of ABC, NBC, CBS and Fox in May 2016, Sony representatives stated that the company intended to reach carriage deals with the independently owned station groups to provide their live signals for PS Vue, stating that it would "continue to work on adding more local stations nationwide." In July and September 2016, PlayStation Vue added a selection of CBS-affiliated stations to its lineup in several mainly large and mid-sized markets, through piecemeal agreements with groups such as the Meredith Corporation (including KCTV in Kansas City, KMOV-TV in St. Louis, KPHO in Phoenix, WFSB in Hartford–New Haven, and WGCL-TV in Atlanta), Sinclair Broadcast Group (including KEYE-TV in Austin, WKRC-TV in Cincinnati, WWMT in Kalamazoo–Grand Rapids, Michigan, WHP in Harrisburg–Lancaster, Pennsylvania, KUTV in Salt Lake City, and WPEC in West Palm Beach), Raycom Media (covering WOIO in Cleveland and WBTV in Charlotte), and Midwest Television (covering KFMB-TV in San Diego). Approximately 50 additional CBS stations including KCCI in Des Moines and WLKY in Louisville were added to PS Vue in January and February 2017 through existing group deals as well as new agreements with companies such as Hearst Television, Heritage Broadcasting Group, Griffin Communications, News-Press & Gazette Company and Gray Television. Outside the aforementioned CBS affiliates, Miami Fox affiliate WSVN (owned by Sunbeam Television), and NBC affiliates KPRC-TV in Houston and WDIV-TV in Detroit (both owned by Graham Media Group), all of the other broadcast television stations that offered on Vue were owned-and-operated stations of their respective parent network.

== Supported devices ==
PlayStation Vue restrictions limited simultaneous streams to five devices at any given time. A single PlayStation Vue account could simultaneously stream live channels from the service on up to one PS4 console and one PS3 console in the same home. Additionally, Amazon Fire TV, Roku, Chromecast, iOS, and Android devices could be used for additional streams, with up to five total devices supported at once.

On October 27, 2016, Sony announced that PlayStation Vue would become available on Android TV, requiring users of the device to have or update to Android OS 4.4 or higher. In that same press release, support for personal computers and Mac was also announced as "coming soon." PlayStation Vue launched a website which extended streaming support for PC, Mac and mobile web browsers on November 8, 2016, which included a detachable mini-player that allowed users to watch programs at the corner of their browser while surfing online. On November 17, 2016, the service was rolled out to Apple TV devices.

Supported devices for PlayStation Vue at the time of the closure included:

=== TV-connected ===
- PlayStation 3 and PlayStation 4 consoles
- Roku (both device and stick)
- Amazon Fire TV (both device and stick)
- Android TV
  - Shield Android TV
- Apple TV

=== Mobile ===
- Android mobile devices
- iOS mobile devices
- Google Chromecast (cast from mobile device)

=== Computer ===
- Watch PlayStation Vue by web browser

== See also ==
- DirecTV Stream
- FuboTV
- Hulu with Live TV
- LocalBTV
- Pluto TV
- Philo
- Sling TV
- YouTube TV
