= Pac-12 Network =

College sports television network

- Country: United States
- Broadcast area: Arizona; California; Colorado; Idaho; Nevada; Oregon; Utah; Washington; Nationwide (via satellite)
- Headquarters: San Ramon, California

Programming
- Language: English

History
- Launched: August 15, 2012; 14 years ago
- Closed: July 1, 2024; 2 years ago

Links
- Website: pac-12.com

Availability

Terrestrial
- Charter Spectrum: "Spectrum TV Silver" Subscription
- Comcast Xfinity: "Digital Preferred" package
- Cox: "Contour TV Preferred" package, "Sports & Info Pak" add-on

Streaming media
- Sling TV: Sports Extra package
- FuboTV: Premier package
- Pac-12 Network Livestream: video.pac-12.com requires login from pay television provider, or in some cases, an ISP to access live content
- Spectrum TV Stream: Only available on the Spectrum TV App on mobile and the Spectrum TV Website with an account subscription.

The Pac-12 Network (P12N), sometimes referred to as Pac-12 Networks, was an American sports-oriented digital cable and satellite television network owned by the Pac-12 Conference. The network's studio and production facilities were headquartered in San Ramon, California.

In addition to the national channel, it also operated a group of six regional sports channels focused on different schools within the conference under the Pac-12 Networks brand:

- Pac-12 Arizona, featuring events from the University of Arizona and Arizona State University
- Pac-12 Bay Area, featuring events from the University of California and Stanford University
- Pac-12 Los Angeles, featuring events from UCLA and University of Southern California
- Pac-12 Mountain, featuring events from the University of Colorado and University of Utah
- Pac-12 Oregon, featuring events from the University of Oregon and Oregon State University
- Pac-12 Washington, featuring events from the University of Washington and Washington State University

The network was shut down on June 30, 2024, following the departure of 10 of the conference's 12 members to the Big Ten, Big 12, and ACC. The remaining Pac-12 Network employees were transitioned to an in-house media department known as Pac-12 Enterprises, which produces the conference's television packages for CW Sports and USA Sports, and has been contracted for remote production services for other clients outside of the conference. It also continues to operate the free ad-supported streaming television (FAST) channel Pac-12 Insider, which features archive content such as classic games, and selected live events.

== History ==
Announced on July 27, 2011 and launched on August 15, 2012, the national network was available on the West Coast in the United States at the time of its debut, while the regional networks are available in all providers within their respective Pac-12 regional territory. It is the third sports network to be devoted to a specific collegiate athletic conference (after the Big Ten Network and the now-defunct MountainWest Sports Network) and the first to be owned by a conference outright without support from outside companies (Fox Entertainment Group owns 60% of Big Ten Network, while the defunct MountainWest Sports Network had CBS and Comcast as partners, and SEC Network and ACC Network are wholly owned by ESPN). The network was headquartered at Pac-12 Conference offices in San Francisco, and shared the $8.35 million in rent for offices in the South of Market Area.

The networks featured 24-hour coverage of Pac-12 sanctioned sporting events, including Olympic sports as well as broadcasts of archived sports telecasts. The contract ensures that every football and men's basketball game is televised nationally. Sports not featured on the national Pac-12 Network are instead carried through the regional networks as well as on the Pac-12 Digital Network, which was launched the same day.

On June 10, 2012, the Pac-12 Conference announced a partnership with pay-per-view service In Demand and Comcast Media Center (CMC) that would provide the networks with technical support, video-on-demand services, and support for TV Everywhere services. The infrastructure of the Pac-12 Networks, twelve member institutions and CMC's operations in Denver, Colorado are connected via fiber network. Master control origination services, including compression and satellite front-haul services, satellite receiver authorizations, and disaster recovery are also run through the CMC in Denver. The following month on July 22, the Pac-12 Conference announced an additional partnership with In-Demand, that would provide mobile production facilities and below-the-line crews for all 12 schools in the conference.

On December 8, 2012, the International Alliance of Theatrical Stage Employees (IATSE) declared a strike against the network, citing the hiring of non-union television crews at lower wages at many of the twelve campus sites. The strike ended 10 days later.

=== Closure ===
The Pac-12's next media rights for football and men's basketball began in the 2024-25 academic year. In July 2022, following the decision of UCLA and USC to move to the Big Ten from 2024, Pat Forde reported that there had been early discussions over the future of the Pac-12 Networks, including the possibility of merging with ESPN's ACC Network which has wider carriage than the Pac-12 Networks. As part of a restructuring, the conference office was shuttered with employees permanently working from home, and the production studios were moved to Bishop Ranch in San Ramon, a Bay Area suburb.

Ultimately, Oregon and Washington would also defect to the Big Ten, while California and Stanford moved to the ACC, and Arizona, Arizona State, Colorado, and Utah all moved to the Big 12, leaving only two members: Oregon State and Washington State.

Jon Wilner of The Mercury News reported that on June 30, 2024, the Pac-12 Networks would cease operation with the expiration of its carriage contracts, while the San Ramon studios will be retained to produce programming for the remaining two members, for at least one year. The conference announced an agreement with CW Sports to carry most of the two teams' home games for the 2024 season on The CW and produce a college football studio show for the network via Pac-12 Enterprises—a media department staffed by the remaining Pac-12 Network employees. The Pac-12 Networks shut down on July 1, 2024 at midnight PT.

Pac-12 Enterprises was used as a sales point to recruit new members to the conference, which resumed full operation on July 1, 2026 with the arrival of seven new members. Programming is produced centrally at Bishop Ranch with low latency and minimal equipment on site. In addition to current and future Pac-12 members, Pac-12 Enterprises also has produced programming for ex-Pac-12 members Arizona and California, ACC Network, the West Coast Conference, and NBC Sports Bay Area (a Golden State Warriors exhibition game).

== Programming ==
The Pac-12 Networks produced telecasts of roughly 850 collegiate events each year (350 events on Pac-12's national network, and 500 events carried on Pac-12 regional networks). The national network included 35 football games, 100 men's basketball games and 40 women's basketball games on an annual basis. The Pac-12 national network also featured all spring football games, coaches shows, and news conferences. The Pac-12 network has also shown rugby matches played by schools from the PAC Rugby Conference, even though college rugby is not a sport sanctioned by the NCAA.

Original programs broadcast by the networks included:

- Pac-12 Sports Report – A weekly studio show discussing and highlighting the Pac-12 events of the week
- Inside Pac-12 Football – A weekly studio show breaking down football news from around the Pac-12
- The Drive – A weekly docu-series that provides a behind-the-scenes look inside Pac-12 football and men's basketball programs
- Pac-12 Classics – A replay of classic Pac-12 games and events which includes commentary from the players and coaches involved
- Pac-12 Encore – A replay of recent Pac-12 games or events
- Pac-12 Playbook – A weekly football coaches show (No longer airing as of 2013)
- The 12 Best – A series that counts down the top 12 conference sports moments within various categories
- Varsity Days – A program featuring footage of Pac-12 athletes and coaches
- Timelines – A 12-installment series chronicling sports moments from the previous year for each Pac-12 school
- Conference of Champions – A non-sports program that profiles current students in various features.

== Carriage ==
The original announcement of the Pac-12 Networks' launch on July 27, 2011 included the announcement of carriage agreements with four major cable providers, Comcast, Time Warner Cable, Cox Communications and Bright House Networks to carry the Pac-12 Network and Pac-12 Digital Network at launch. The agreements did not guarantee that the Pac-12 Networks would be available in all areas within the territory of a Pac-12 university, and a minimum of 40 million homes nationally at launch date. The agreements complemented a 12-year deal that the Pac-12 Conference had struck with Fox Sports and ESPN that began in 2012. In addition, the network entered into extended negotiations with satellite providers. Pac-12 commissioner Larry Scott stated in a May 8, 2012 interview with sports radio station KJR in Seattle that he is "quietly optimistic" that deals with providers would be made in time for the channel's planned fall 2012 launch. The Pac-12 Network was never carried by DirecTV, Charter Communications (except Dallas and Los Angeles) and Verizon FiOS.

On July 20, 2012, the Pac-12 Conference announced a long-term agreement with the National Cable Television Cooperative (NCTC), a cooperative of 900 mostly smaller and rural cable providers, allowing any member of the NCTC access to carry one or more of the Pac-12 Network as well as providing access to the Pac-12 Digital Network through the NCTC WTVE TV Everywhere platform. In an August 10, 2012 conference, the conference announced that NCTC members Strata Networks and All West Communications in Utah, San Bruno Cable in the San Francisco Bay Area, GCI in Alaska, LocalTel Communications in Wenatchee, WA and Ashland Communications in Oregon had agreed to carry the Pac-12 Network. On July 28, 2012, Frontier Communications announced on one of its official Facebook accounts that the company would carry the channel on Frontier FiOS TV. The deal was officially announced on August 1, 2012.

Several smaller providers reached carriage agreements with the network during the month of August 2012. On August 1, Oregon-based cable providers BendBroadband announced an intention to carry the Pac-12 Network as well as the Pac-12 Digital Network on their "bendbroadband2go" TV Everywhere platform. Two days later on August 3, 2012, Arizona-based Western Broadband and Orbitel Communications announced their intent to carry the Pac-12 Arizona Network. On August 6, Astound Broadband announced an intention to carry the Pac-12 Bay Area Network. A day later on August 7, Wave Broadband announced an intention to carry the Pac-12 Bay Area, Oregon, and Washington Networks. On August 8, 2012, CC Communications announced its intent to carry the Pac-12 National Network and one Pac-12 regional channel (on August 30, 2012, CC Communications began carrying the Pac-12 Mountain network, in addition to the national network). Click! Network also revealed on their official Facebook page that it would carry the Pac-12 Network. On August 21, 2012, Canby Telecom announced an intention to carry the Pac-12 National Network as well as all Pac-12 regional networks.

On September 8, 2012, Dish Network announced that it would carry the Pac-12 National Network starting on September 8. To date, it is the only satellite carrier to have struck a carriage agreement with the Pac-12 Networks, and was the largest pay television provider to reach a carriage deal during 2012, bringing the Pac-12 Networks' national coverage to approximately 60 million households. On February 1, 2016, however, Pac-12 restricted access to the regional channels for DISH subscribers. On October 10, 2012, the conference came to an agreement with Consolidated Communications for its SureWest Communications system in Northern California to carry the Pac-12 Networks Bay Area regional service. On September 6, 2013, Pac-12 Networks entered into a deal with AT&T U-verse to carry the main feed on channel 759 (as well as on channel 760 in the San Francisco Bay Area, and on channel 761 in Los Angeles).

As of 2015, the Pac-12 Networks were "available in" 90 million homes, but about 12 million actually subscribed to the network, according to SNL Kagan. On February 10, 2016, the Canadian Radio-television and Telecommunications Commission on behalf of Jessop & Proulx LLP, added Pac-12 Network to its list of foreign broadcasters that are allowed to be carried by Canadian pay television providers. By the end of 2016, Pac-12 Network had carriage deals with Charter Communications in Los Angeles and Dallas, Frontier FiOS, and streaming service Sling TV, but still had not come to terms with DirecTV. In August 2017, the Pac-12 Networks were added to FuboTV.

On November 28, 2018, it was reported that the Pac-12 Networks will no longer be available on AT&T U-verse as of December 2, 2018. Approximately 19 million homes were subscribed to the network in 2018, according to SNL Kagan.

In March 2019, Pac-12 Network announced partnerships with the Seven Network's 7plus streaming service in Australia, and DAZN in Canada, to carry programming from the service.

An agreement with DirecTV was never reached. Pac-12 Networks president Mark Shuken stated "Our presidents, our athletic directors, when we talk, we talk about skating to where the puck's going, not where it's been" referring to the decline of satellite TV and the rise of streaming services.

== On-air staff ==
Basketball and football

- Ashley Adamson – studio host
- Roxy Bernstein – football and basketball game announcer
- Lisa Byington – football and basketball game announcer
- Kevin Calabro – football and basketball game announcer
- Rich Cellini – football and basketball game announcer
- Aaron Goldsmith – football and basketball game announcer
- Guy Haberman – football and basketball game announcer
- Greg Heister – football and basketball game announcer
- Jordan Kent – track and field, football and basketball game announcer
- J. B. Long – basketball and football game announcer
- Ted Robinson – lead football and basketball game announcer
- Mark Rogondino – soccer and basketball game announcer
- Paul Sunderland – basketball game announcer
- Jim Watson – basketball game announcer
- Ron Pitts – football game announcer
- Glenn Parker – lead football game analyst
- Curtis Conway – studio football analyst
- Ronnie Lott – studio football analyst
- Jeremy Bloom – football game/studio analyst
- Nigel Burton – football game analyst
- Jake Plummer – studio football analyst
- Yogi Roth – football game/studio analyst
- Ben Braun – men's basketball analyst
- P.J. Carlesimo – men's basketball analyst
- Jarron Collins – men's basketball analyst
- Dan Dickau – men's basketball analyst
- Sean Elliott – men's basketball analyst
- Doug Gottlieb – men's basketball analyst
- Lamar Hurd – men's basketball analyst
- Ernie Kent – men's basketball analyst
- Steve Lavin – former men's basketball analyst
- Matt Muehlebach – men's basketball analyst
- Don MacLean – lead men's basketball analyst
- Mary Murphy – women's basketball analyst
- Kevin O'Neill – men's basketball analyst
- Bill Walton – men's basketball analyst

Other sports

- Mike Yam – former studio host/news anchor
- Anne Marie Anderson – women's sports game announcer
- Kevin Barnett – volleyball game announcer
- Krista Blunk – women's sports game announcer
- Jason Knapp – water polo and lacrosse announcer
- Ato Boldon – track and field analyst
- Eric Byrnes – baseball game analyst
- Justin Gimelstob – tennis analyst
- Cobi Jones – soccer analyst
- Holly McPeak – sand volleyball analyst
- Al Scates – men's volleyball analyst
- J. T. Snow – baseball game analyst
- Kevin Stocker – baseball game analyst
- Kevin Wong – men's volleyball analyst

=== Member institution contributions ===
- The UCLA Music Department helped with the networks' on-air music production
- Arizona State University and Washington State University provided access to their digital imaging libraries
- USC Annenberg School for Communication and Journalism at the University of Southern California also provided contributions

== Online services ==
=== Pac-12 Now ===
Pac-12 Now was Pac-12 Networks' TV Everywhere platform. Developed in partnership with Ooyala, it offered streaming of the Pac-12 Networks for television subscribers, as well as 800 live sporting events not on television per season.

=== Pac-12 Plus ===
In June 2016, the Pac-12 announced that it would stream 150 live conference Olympic sports events in the 2016–17 season via Twitter's live streaming functionality under the Pac-12 Plus banner.

=== Pac-12 Insider ===
In November 2020, Pac-12 Networks launched a free ad-supported streaming television (FAST) channel known as Pac-12 Insider. The service focuses primarily on original content, including classic events, original digital programming and highlights, and a slate of live events in Olympic sports. It launched first on Samsung TV Plus, Redbox Free Live TV and Xumo Play. The channel continues to operate, even after Pac-12 Network was shut down. During the conference's de facto hiatus, the channel aired home baseball and gymnastics featuring Oregon State University. In 2025, Cal State Bakersfield, a Pac-12 affiliate in men's wrestling, announced an agreement to air home college wrestling duels on the service.
