= Multichannel television in the United States =

Distribution of television programming to customers for a subscription fee in the USA

Multichannel television has been available in the United States since at least 1948. The U.S. is served by cable television systems, direct-broadcast satellite providers, and various other wireline video providers; among the largest television providers in the U.S. are YouTube TV, DirecTV, Optimum Communications, Charter Communications (through its Spectrum division, which also includes the former Time Warner Cable and Bright House Networks systems), Comcast (through its Xfinity division), Dish Network, Verizon Communications (through its FiOS division), and Cox Communications. The Telecommunications Act of 1996 defines a multichannel video programming distributor (MVPD) as "a person such as, but not limited to, a cable operator, a multichannel multipoint distribution service, a direct broadcast satellite service, or a television receive-only satellite program distributor, who makes available for purchase, by subscribers or customers, multiple channels of video programming", where a channel is defined as a "signaling path provided by a cable television system."

In 1975, the cable television industry had 9.8 million subscriptions across 71.1 million U.S. households (or approximately 14%), which grew to 19.2 million subscriptions across the 80.8 million households (or approximately 24%) by 1980. By 1988, cable television subscriptions grew to 45.7 million across 91.1 million households (or approximately 50%), while cable and satellite television subscriptions combined grew to 66.2 million across 99 million households (or approximately 67%) by 1995. While the number of cable television subscriptions began declining in 2001, combined cable and satellite subscriptions grew further to 90.5 million across 112 million households (or approximately 80%) by 2004, and combined subscriptions continued to grow to 95.5 million through 2007 after which combined subscriptions began falling during the Great Recession. Pew Research Center survey data has shown that the percentage of American adults reporting having a cable or satellite television subscription fell from 76% in 2015 to 56% in 2021, while 2025 survey data found that only 36% of American adults reported having a cable or satellite television subscription. Nielsen Media Research data showed that number the household MVPD subscription rate fell from 87% in 2015 to 47% by 2023.

While multichannel television initially served as a means to provide local television stations to customers who could not receive them over-the-air, in the 1980s and 1990s deployments of communications satellites made it financially feasible for channels of national interest such as superstations and other premium television to be distributed by cable providers, and eventually directly to viewers' home satellite receivers.

The market share of multichannel television began to erode in the mid-2010s due to the increasing popularity of subscription-based Internet video services, the increasing costs of cable and satellite services due to the carriage fees demanded by major channels, as well as consumers intentionally dropping traditional television service in favor of alternatives such as subscription video on demand (SVOD) services, and linear television services that are delivered entirely over the public internet, or never subscribing to such a service at all.

== Platforms ==
=== Cable television ===
John Walson of Mahanoy City, Pennsylvania was credited with having established the first cable television service in the U.S. in 1948. He created the service in order to improve the availability of television stations to those with poor reception due to tall mountains and buildings.

The launch of communications satellites, such as Satcom I, enabled broadcasters to send out their programming nationally for hundreds of dollars per hour rather than costlier telephone lines and microwave relay systems. This development spurred the launched of prominent services intended for distribution by cable systems, such as HBO and fledgling Atlanta-based superstation WTCG. By 1980, 15 million of the 75–80 million U.S. homes with at least one television set had a cable television subscription, and one prediction was for that number to double by 1985.

By 1981, eleven communications satellites were in use, and the Federal Communications Commission planned 24 to be in use by 1985. Most cable channels wanted space on Satcom I, since cable companies had receiving dishes aiming in that direction. In November 1981, Satcom III-R replaced Satcom I, which changed to voice and data distribution.

=== Growth of satellite ===
Some areas were too remote for cable or even any over-the-air reception, and other areas did not have a cable television system. In the early days of home satellite dishes, the two types of service were low-power C-band service with large dishes 8 to 12 feet wide, and high-power Ku-band.

In 1979, COMSAT announced a plan to allow viewers to receive programming directly from broadcast satellites, a concept called direct-broadcast satellite (DBS). This system would cost "hundreds of millions of dollars" and, at the time, was expected to be ready by the 1990s. Later, the company changed its target date to 1986. By 1983, the FCC had authorized several other companies to offer DBS service. These included CBS, RCA and Western Union, as well as Rupert Murdoch-led Skyband. Unlike the larger television receive-only dishes, DBS used higher-powered satellites with smaller, more affordable dishes that were two to three feet wide.

On November 16, 1983, the first DBS service, with 50 customers paying $39.95 a month for five channels in the Indianapolis, Indiana area, was launched by United Satellite Communications Inc. (USCI), a joint venture of Prudential Insurance, General Instrument and investors that included Francesco Galesi. USCI did not wait for more powerful satellite technology, but instead used the Canadian Anik C2. The company also signed an agreement with ESPN and made programming arrangements with distributors rather than existing cable channels. Similar to British Sky Broadcasting (and its predecessors Sky Television and British Satellite Broadcasting) in the United Kingdom, USCI also maintained its own in-house channels: these included two premium channels – USCI Movietime (focusing entirely on feature films) and USCI Showcase (which offered a mix of films and specials similar to the formats of HBO and Showtime) – USCI TV Time (which featured a mix of children's and cultural programs, classic television series and movies) and Video Music (a music video channel similar to MTV). While cable could provide more channels at a cheaper rate, cable was too expensive to offer in rural areas. Also, cable was not yet available in larger cities such as Philadelphia and Chicago. USCI president Nathaniel Kwit stated that 30 million people would never be served by cable companies, and DBS would have 5 million subscribers by 1990. One prediction for USCI was for 2.4 million customers by 1986. With little success in Indiana, USCI began looking to Washington, D.C., Baltimore and Philadelphia. Early in 1984, USCI expanded into 15 markets in the Northeast and Midwest. At first, USCI leased its equipment because people might be reluctant to buy an unproven technology, but the company later sold its dishes. COMSAT planned to compete with USCI, offering lower prices, but lost its backing from CBS in June 1984.

Of the eight original companies planning DBS service, none had a working system by the start of 1985. The expected cost of entering the market ranged from $200 to $500 million, with $100 million required to put a satellite in orbit. Only Direct Broadcast Satellite Corp., United States Satellite Broadcasting and Dominion Satellite Network still had plans to go ahead, while RCA was looking at changes in its system. Even USCI, which used a Canadian satellite that did not require FCC approval to use, was in trouble. The company had the capability to serve 52 percent of people in the United States but after a year, USCI had only 11,000 customers. USCI's inability to get channels such as CNN, along with a monthly cost of at least $24.95, in addition to the $400 to $700 for the receiver needed to pick up a still-weak signal, kept the numbers low. Another problem was that HBO and other channels used C-band while USCI was Ku-band. USCI needed a significantly higher amount of money and began looking at possible mergers. The company could not afford to expand and it had been unable to strike deals with other companies, so its service ended without warning on April 1, 1985. USCI filed for bankruptcy, and one company offered to convert USCI dishes to C-band. People were allowed to keep their dishes; half had bought them and half had leased them, however it was unclear who if anyone would provide the service.

In October 1984, the U.S. Congress passed the Cable Communications Act of 1984, which gave those using dishes the right to see signals for free unless they were scrambled, and required those who did scramble to make their signals available for a fee. Since cable channels could prevent reception by big dishes, other companies had an incentive to offer competition. Dominion planned inspirational programming, USSB intended to sell dishes with three channels of free programming, and Direct Broadcast Satellite Corp. would be a common carrier airing programming from those who paid.

In 1992, nearly all MVPD customers had cable television service. In 1994, PrimeStar, DirecTV and USSB began offering digital satellite service. With one million subscribers in 18 months, digital direct broadcast satellite set a record for the quickest acceptance of a new technology; by comparison, it took four years before the VCR sold one million units. EchoStar and AlphaStar debuted in 1996. 2.2 million people subscribed to C-band service requiring 6-foot dishes costing as much as $1,500; this number remained steady, while digital satellite service with 18-inch dishes experienced phenomenal growth, reaching 4.5 million subscribers by the end of 1996, up by about two million subscribers in a year. Cable television services had 65 million subscribers, but were already starting to see customers switch to satellite. Satellite television offered more channels than cable did at the time due to limited headend capacity, although broadcast networks were not allowed if their affiliates could be received with an antenna. DirecTV and USSB had 2.5 million subscribers, while PrimeStar, with 27-inch dishes that could be rented rather than purchased, had 1.6 million subscribers. Cable companies responded to the success of satellite by adopting digital cable services that offered more channels, and required the use of digital set-top boxes. They also owned a share of PrimeStar, because offering cable in rural areas was deemed to be too expensive.

In 1996, the FCC said local zoning laws could not prevent most smaller dishes. Another advancement in satellite TV came with the Satellite Home Viewer Improvement Act of 1999 (SHVIA), which allowed local channels to be included in satellite TV packages. Previously, this was only possible if an area had no local broadcast network affiliates.

A January 8, 2001 report commissioned by the FCC stated that in the year ending June 2000, the number of satellite subscribers had increased from 10.1 million to 13 million people, an increase three times that of cable. Satellite represented 15.4 percent of those paying for television service, while the percentage of those who had cable dropped from 82% to 80%. Cable charges increased at a rate 50% higher than the Consumer Price Index.

By 2012, satellite dishes accounted for 30% of the pay television market.

=== Wireline and broadband ===
In 2005, Verizon Communications launched FiOS, a new suite of television, internet, and phone services delivered over a fiber-optic infrastructure. In 2006, AT&T followed suit with the introduction of U-verse.

=== Virtual MVPD, TV Everywhere, and over-the-top media services ===
The subscription television market in the U.S. began to erode in the 2010s due to multiple factors. Some have cited higher costs due to deregulation of cable television and tied selling practices (which force subscribers to pay monthly for a large bundle of unwanted channels to receive a few desired programs). Over-the-top video on demand services, such as Netflix, have also appealed to changing viewing habits, such as the growth of mobile device usage for media consumption. The market trend of cord cutters has seen viewers cutting back or dropping their television subscriptions in favor of using a mixture of sources, such as terrestrial television and internet streaming services, as an alternative.

The multichannel television industry began to employ efforts to entice potential cord cutters, such as "TV Everywhere"—a concept which allows subscribers to participating television channels to access their on-demand and live programming through websites and mobile apps tied to a user account. In 2015, Dish Network announced a service known as Sling TV, a streaming, multichannel video service (virtual MVPD or vMVPD) offering a focused selection of popular cable networks, delivered via apps for mobile devices and other digital media players over the internet. By 2018, the service had reached 2 million subscribers, and prompted the launch of competitors from AT&T (DirecTV Now, which had reached 1 million), Hulu, Sony (PlayStation Vue) and YouTube TV. By 2019 Q3, analysts estimated vMVPDs have nearly 9 million subscribers in the United States.

Comcast introduced a streaming television service as a lower-cost alternative to their main service, delivered through managed networks as part of their internet services. Similarly, Time Warner Cable trialled the use of Roku devices as a set-top box in 2015. In October 2015, TWC began to trial a service under which subscribers are given a Roku 3 digital media player to access their service via the supplied TWC app, rather than a traditional set-top box. A TWC spokesperson emphasized that this offering would provide "the same TV and same packages delivered to the home today", but delivered over TWC-managed internet rather than a cable line.

With the mass proliferation of over-the-top subscription services intending to compete with legacy players, analysts have argued that the market is becoming too fragmented, and giving consumers "fatigue" over the sheer number of options.

A 2019 Leichtman Research Group study involving 6,715 households showed that 43 percent of vMVPD subscribers changed from a traditional MVPD. 17 percent dropped their previous vMVPD for another one, 25 percent also had a linear service, and 15 percent had never used a traditional MVPD. 71 percent of vMVPD users, the study said, were in the 18-44 group, in which 16 percent used a vMVPD. Only 6 percent of those over 45 used a vMVPD.

The introduction of ATSC 3.0 broadcasting in the 2020s led to trials of vMVPDs carried via OTA signals; startup company Edge Networks began operating a multichannel service known as Evoca in markets such as Boise, Denver, and Portland, which utilized set-top boxes that aggregated internet-delivered channels with channels delivered via encrypted signals on ATSC 3.0 stations (including offers to bundle other services such as Sling TV on the same boxes). The company closed in 2022, citing a lack of growth and "coordinated refusal" from the major networks to license content to the venture.

== Regulation ==
In 1972, the Federal Communications Commission (FCC) established basic regulations for cable providers, including franchise and technical standards, and requiring them to register for a certificate of compliance before operation.

The Cable Communications Policy Act of 1984, otherwise known as the Cable Act, enacted further policies for the regulation of cable systems. The act established standards for the operational standards and development of cable systems, and gave municipalities the authority to grant and renew cable system franchises based on compliance with them and stated plans for future development. It stated that cable systems should reflect the needs of local communities in order to provide "the widest possible diversity of information sources and services". It recommended that local and state authorities encourage the establishment of Public, educational, and government access networks. The act also prevented the FCC and states from regulating the cost of cable service if they had "effective competition" from a large number of unique broadcast services (however, all existing cable systems qualified under this criterion, which allowed them to raise their prices).

In 1992, Congress passed the Cable Television Consumer Protection and Competition Act that was designed to promote competition and consumer protection in the cable television industry. The act mandated that cable providers carry all local full-power or otherwise qualified broadcast television stations on their service. However, commercial stations have the option to opt-out of must-carry, and require financial compensation for their carriage instead. It also required cable networks operated by cable companies to offer their carriage to competing satellite providers at reasonable rates if they used satellites as part of their distribution path. The act also narrowed the standard required for prohibiting rate regulation, requiring the provider to serve less than 30% of their franchise area, or two unaffiliated providers, serving at least 50% of the area, serve at least 15% of the market.

The Telecommunications Act of 1996 amended Section 602 (13) of the Communications Act of 1934 to define a "Multichannel video programming distributor" (MVPD) as "a person such as, but not limited to, a cable operator, a multichannel multipoint distribution service, a direct broadcast satellite service, or a television receive-only satellite program distributor, who makes available for purchase, by subscribers or customers, multiple channels of video programming", where a channel is defined as a "signaling path provided by a cable television system."

Certain cable provider-owned regional sports networks worked around the program access rules by deliberately excluding satellites from their distribution path. This allowed them to restrict the carriage of these lucrative networks by competing providers, thus providing a selling point for their service. In 2010, the FCC removed this particular exception to the program access rules. The action was based on a complaint by AT&T that Cox Communications was unduly affecting the marketability of their services in San Diego, by not allowing them to carry the Cox-owned 4SD—the local rightsholder of San Diego Padres baseball.

=== Regulation of set-top boxes ===
Under the Telecommunications Act of 1996, the FCC was instructed to develop a means for television providers to offer a standalone conditional access module for digital cable services, in order to allow third-party devices to access the services as an alternative to a proprietary set-top box provisioned by the MVPD. In 1998, the FCC ordered that a modular security component must be made available by July 1, 2000, and that cable providers must phase out the provision of hardware with integrated conditional access or security functions by January 1, 2005. An industry consortium known as CableLabs officially introduced a standard known as CableCARD in 2003 to comply with this mandate. These cards could be inserted into slots on devices such as televisions and digital video recorders to allow access to digital cable channels without a set-top box. CableCARDs were cheaper to rent than a cable box, but the first version of the standard did not support two-way communications for interactive services such as video on-demand or pay-per-view facilities, thus giving the system a disadvantage over cable boxes.

The integration ban was delayed until (and officially took effect on) July 1, 2007. The cable industry lobbied for the ban to be delayed, citing factors such as a lack of demand for the CableCARDs (a factor induced by the cost of devices which supported them), as well as its limitations on two-way services—especially due to the growing video on-demand market, and switched video—a technique that enabled an increase in capacity for high-definition channels. In 2008, the industry attempted to adopt a middleware standard known as tru2way, which did not require a smart card and would support two-way services delivered directly to devices. However, tru2way had limited to no consumer adoption; despite most major providers pledging to deploy it by mid-2009, Panasonic only sold compatible televisions in three Comcast test markets before discontinuing them in 2010 in favor of a set-back box. The integration ban was repealed in 2015 as a condition of the STELA Reauthorization Act of 2014.

In 2010, the FCC issued a notice of inquiry proposing a concept known as AllVid, which involved the introduction of "adapters" that would abstract television services from the devices which deliver them, allowing the development of devices that could converge subscription television with internet video. The FCC stated that it was "not convinced that the tru2way solution will assure the development of a commercial retail market as directed by Congress." Despite support by major firms such as Sony and Google (the latter having recently launched a digital media player platform known as Google TV), AllVid was widely-opposed by the multichannel industry, as well as the Motion Picture Association of America (who argued that copyright infringing media sources could be presented alongside legitimate options in search interfaces).

Also in 2010, the U.S. government passed the Twenty-First Century Communications and Video Accessibility Act, which requires that televisions and MVPD set-top boxes be accessible to those who are blind and visually impaired, including support for audio description.

In 2016, the FCC, under chairman Tom Wheeler, voted 3-2 to authorize a notice of proposed rulemaking proposing that MVPDs be required to make their programming and other related data "be available to the creators of competitive solutions using any published, transparent format that conforms to specifications set by an independent, open standards body." The cable industry opposed this proposal, due to the lack of control they would have on the user experience (citing the possibility that third-party developers could inject their own advertising into the interface, even though the proposal specified that there would be regulations against this). They instead proposed an industry commitment for television providers with more than 1 million subscribers to develop apps to access their services on major connected devices, using HTML5 standards. Public Knowledge questioned the proposal, arguing that the provision of the apps and "whether consumers would need a broadband connection to access video programming instead of leveraging their existing pay TV connections" were unclear, and that it "does not allow for many features that consumers want, such as home recording, and it does not allow for true user interface competition." In January 2017, new Trump administration FCC commissioner Ajit Pai (who voted against it) removed Wheeler's set-top box proposal from the FCC's items on circulation.

In 2020, the FCC withdrew the requirement for television providers to specifically support CableCARD, citing changes in the industry and a lack of consumer interest. The FCC still mandates that MVPDs must still offer "separable security".

=== Linear online video providers ===
The increasing prominence of linear IPTV services delivered entirely over the public internet (also referred to as an "over-the-top" television service, "linear online video provider" (OVD), or "virtual MVPD") has led to questions over whether they can be regulated by the FCC in the same way as traditional television providers. A key sticking point is the established standard in case law, that a television provider must control the entire infrastructure used to distribute their channels in order to be classified as a multichannel video programming distributor (which does not take into account the public internet).

Sky Angel, a Christian over-the-top IPTV service which formerly operated as a satellite provider, was faced with multiple carriage disputes over the changes. In 2009, C-SPAN was pulled only 2 days after it was added, with the network citing contractual issues which prevented Sky Angel from streaming the channel. Sky Angel filed antitrust lawsuits against C-SPAN in 2012 and 2013, claiming that its ownership group (which is composed of competing television providers) was colluding against Sky Angel to protect their business, and pointed out that C-SPAN already streamed its programming online for free. The suits were dismissed for presenting insufficient evidence of antitrust violations.

In 2010, Discovery Communications also pulled its networks from Sky Angel, prompting the provider to file a formal complaint under the Cable Television Consumer Protection and Competition Act. Sky Angel argued that Discovery was discriminating against its service, because it had allowed other providers to stream its programming online through other manners (such as TV Everywhere services). The FCC denied the complaint, but its Media Bureau acknowledged that OVDs did not formally fall under the definition of an MVPD because they did not control a physical transmission path. Sky Angel was thus ineligible for protections under the program access rules and other relevant laws, but the Media Bureau did open a discussion on whether an OVD could qualify as an MVPD. Members of the cable industry supported this historic interpretation of the law, while it was also argued that classifying streaming services as MVPDs would increase regulatory burden and discourage innovation by digital services.

Another prominent case was that of Aereo; the service allowed users to rent an antenna from a centralized location, and stream feeds of local broadcast television channels received via the antenna. By doing so, Aereo argued that its service was a placeshifting solution that rented access to hardware, and thus did not require permission from broadcasters to retransmit their programming. However, the U.S. Supreme Court ruled in American Broadcasting Cos. v. Aereo, Inc. that this violated copyright law, as the streams still constituted an unauthorized public performance, and that despite claims to the contrary, its business model was substantially similar to that of a cable television provider (but the Court did not go as far as claiming Aereo was an MVPD). The company attempted to use this ruling in an effort to apply for a compulsory license from the U.S. Copyright Office instead. However, international treaties forbid the establishment of blanket licenses for streaming broadcast television stations over the internet, thus the Copyright Office ruled that this was outside of its scope.

In 2019, a similar service emerged known as Locast. Unlike Aereo, it was run by a non-profit advocacy group rather than a commercial entity, and asserts itself as being a non-profit broadcast relay station (which are exempted under U.S. copyright law) that collected donations from users to cover the "actual and reasonable costs" of providing the relay. Locast was a free service, but periodically interrupted programming to solicit for donations until one was made. In September 2021, the service shut down after U.S District Court Judge Louis Stanton denied a request by Locast for a summary judgment in a similar lawsuit brought upon by the networks. Stanton described Locast's periodic interruptions as being a "charge" and "not merely a recurring gift to a charitable cause", and also singled out that the company had derived revenue double its operating expenses, and had stated that it planned to use its donations to cover expansion (which is not covered by the exemption in copyright law).

== Programming ==
=== Carriage and cost of service ===
Many cable channels charge providers fees in order to carry their content. The fee that the cable service provider must pay to a cable television channel can vary depending on whether it is a basic or premium channel and the perceived popularity of that channel. As providers are not required to carry all channels, they may negotiate the fee they will pay for carriage of particular services. Typically, more popular channels command higher fees; for example, ESPN typically charges $10 per month for its suite of networks ($7 for the main channel alone), by far the highest of any non-premium American cable channel, comparable to the premium channels, and rising rapidly. ESPN and other regional sports networks, as well as retransmission consent negotiations by broadcast television outlets, have frequently been cited as contributing to the increasing cost of television subscriptions.

== Statistics ==
=== Largest ad-supported cable channels ===
Top 10 advertising-supported cable channels by viewership (2016)
Rank	Channel	Avg. Viewers
1.	Fox News Channel	2,480,000
2.	ESPN	1,910,000
3.	USA Network	1,680,000
4.	TBS	1,590,000
5.	HGTV	1,580,000
6.	TNT	1,550,000
7.	Discovery Channel	1,400,000
8.	History	1,330,000
9.	Disney Channel	1,320,000
10.	CNN	1,300,000

=== Top multichannel video service providers in the United States by number of subscribers ===
Rank	Company	Brand	Total subscribers	Technology	Date/source
1	Charter Communications	Spectrum	13,800,000	Cable	Q3 2026
2	Alphabet Inc. (Google)	YouTube TV	11,000,000+	IPTV	Q1 2026
3	Comcast	Xfinity	10,394,000	Cable	Q3 2026
4	TPG Inc.	DirecTV	8,200,000	Satellite/IPTV	Q1 2026
5	Disney	Hulu + Live TV; FuboTV	5,750,000	IPTV	Q2 2026
6	EchoStar	Dish Network	4,680,000	Satellite	Q2 2026
7	Verizon	Fios	2,441,000	Fiber	Q4 2025
8	EchoStar	Sling TV	1,710,000	IPTV	Q2 2026
9	Optimum Communications	Optimum	1,530,000	Cable	Q2 2026
10	Skydance; AMC; Hearst	Philo	1,300,000	IPTV	Q1 2025
11	Roku, Inc.	Frndly TV	700,000	IPTV	Q4 2022
12	Mediacom	Xtream	510,000	Cable	Q1 2023
13	Cogeco	Breezeline	220,354	Cable	Q1 2026
14	Cincinnati Bell	Altafiber	141,300	Fiber	Q4 2025
15	Telephone and Data Systems	TDS Telecom	114,000	Fiber	Q2 2026
16	Cable One	Sparklight	77,600	Cable	Q4 2025

== See also ==
- List of multiple-system operators
- Cord-cutting
- Network era
- Multi-channel transition
- Post-network era
- Golden Age of Television (2000s–2023)
- Streaming television
