= Carriage dispute =

Disagreement over the right to retransmit a broadcaster's signal

A carriage dispute is a disagreement over the right to "carry", that is, retransmit, a broadcaster's signal. Carriage disputes first occurred between broadcasters and cable companies and now include direct broadcast satellite and other multichannel video programming distributors.

These disputes often involve financial compensation – what the distributor pays the television station or network for the right to carry the signal – as well as what channels the distributor is permitted or required to retransmit and how the distributor offers those channels to its subscribers. While most carriage disputes are resolved without controversy or notice, others have involved programming blackouts, both threatened and real, as well as strident public relations campaigns. Carriage disputes have occurred both in the United States and internationally. Cord-cutting has lessened the impact as more people move from traditional distributors to streaming media services.

== History ==
The history of carriage disputes can be seen as having two distinct circumstances: the first involving over-the-air broadcasters, whose signals can be received with an antenna; the second involving broadcasters transmitting via cable, satellite or other means—but not over the air. In the United States, the first led to a quagmire of legal disputes involving the Federal Communications Commission and the courts, shifting regulations, and questions over copyright law – all revolving around the basic question of whether a carrier has an inherent right to retransmit an over-the-air signal. Broadcasters accused carriers of being "leeches", making money off of programming content that they contributed nothing to produce. Carriers countered that their role was largely passive, because they were merely redistributing freely available signals more widely. By contrast, carriage disputes involving broadcasters who do not use the public airwaves, while representing many high-profile encounters, have raised fewer legal and policy questions, playing out largely at the negotiation table and in the court of public opinion.

The legal precedent for carriage disputes dates back to 1934 legislation, which required a broadcaster to get permission before using programming from another broadcaster. The law was later applied to cable companies, as well. In the 1950s, cable companies operating in the western United States began retransmitting broadcast signals for the benefit of customers situated too far from the station's transmitter to receive programs with an antenna. Stations objected that they were not being compensated for this retransmission or that they were having to compete with more distant stations that duplicated their content. From February 15, 1966, to December 18, 1968, the United States Federal Communications Commission barred cable companies from importing non-local broadcast signals into the top 100 television markets – while allowing cable companies to petition for exceptions. After an interim period, the FCC partially lifted these restrictions in 1972, eliminating them entirely by the end of the decade.

The issue was finally resolved with the 1992 Cable Television Consumer Protection and Competition Act. Among its provisions, the act mandated that distributors must carry local stations who make their signal available for free, but must also get retransmission consent before a signal can be retransmitted. Mandatory retransmission consent gave broadcasters the ability to seek compensation from distributors and established the basis for carriage disputes going forward. At first, the larger broadcasters negotiated not for higher fees, but for inclusion of their newer, lesser known, non-terrestrial channels. Fox, for example, obtained distribution for FX (now owned by the Walt Disney Company); NBC for CNBC. The practice complicated carriage disputes by making bundled tiers not just a marketing choice, but a contractual obligation.

Between 2013 and 2020, the largest cable networks lost about $179.5 million in revenues from carriage disputes "that resulted in blackouts that were eventually resolved", according to the analysis firm S&P Global Intelligence in a 2021 report. Paramount Global topped the list, losing $40 million over the period, while Comcast, Fox Corporation, and the National Football League each lost more than $30 million. The most costly carriage disputes pitted cable networks primarily against Dish Network, as well as Suddenlink Communications (now rebranded "Optimum") and Verizon Communications. (Comcast, which is both an internet service provider and a broadcasting and cable company, was at different times on both sides of the negotiating table.)

S&P Global said the blackouts came from cable networks seeking better deals "with traditional multichannel operators, which still serve more than half of the video subscription market in the U.S. and still supply billions of dollars in revenues for the cable network industry." Even with steady subscriber losses, the traditional cable industry remained a profitable business.

Blackouts per year
2010	8
2011	42
2012	90
2013	119
2014	94
2015	123
2016	104
2017	213
2018	140
2019	276 (as of Oct.)
2020	336
2021	105
2022	303 (est.)

=== Examples ===
==== United States ====
A Time Warner Cable advertisement from its December 2009 carriage dispute with Fox. Designed to resemble a ransom note, the ad continued: “We’re standing up to Fox. Don’t let Fox hold your TV hostage.”

The 2009 dispute between Time Warner Cable and Fox is an example of a carriage dispute involving an over-the-air broadcaster. The dispute pitted the second largest United States cable system against one of the four major U.S. television networks, whose broadcasts included the popular prime time series American Idol and National Football League games. Fox's then-parent company, News Corporation reportedly sought a monthly fee of $1 per subscriber; Time Warner offered 20 to 25 cents. Both companies mounted aggressive public relations campaigns, including dedicated websites and advertising. Fox suggested that viewers look into alternatives to Time Warner, including satellite and Verizon's Fios service. Time Warner Cable countered that it was trying to rein in expenses that would ultimately be paid by subscribers. The companies ultimately settled close to the deadline, and, as is typical with carriage disputes, did not disclose the terms. The deal encouraged other over-the-air broadcasters to seek higher retransmission payments, thereby putting upward pressure on cable and satellite bills.

The 2012 dispute between DirecTV and Viacom is an example of a dispute involving a non-terrestrial broadcaster. Viacom's cable/satellite channels, including Comedy Central, Nickelodeon and MTV, were blacked out for some 20 million DirecTV subscribers, who together represented about 20 percent of all U.S. households who subscribed to cable or satellite. DirecTV claimed Viacom was seeking a 30 percent fee hike, about $1 billion over five years. Viacom countered that while its channels represented 20 percent of total DirecTV viewing, the broadcaster received only 5 percent of the distributor's license fees. DirecTV argued that Viacom made too much of its content available for free on the Internet. Viacom responded that the practice was a marketing tool, although it pared that content back after the blackout. Also mentioned as a point of contention was Viacom's bundling of its co-owned channels – making them available to distributors only as a package rather than individually. In a sign of the increasing pressure on carriers to limit subscriber fees, DirecTV competitors did not mount advertising campaigns to attract disgruntled customers, and some competitors issued statements of support. Viacom and DirecTV resolved the dispute with a seven-year contract nine days later. Financial terms were not disclosed, though one analyst estimated Viacom would receive around $2.85 per subscriber, up from $2.25. In a first for Viacom, the company also agreed to give DirecTV customers access to live feeds on mobile devices.

Occasionally, a carriage dispute can last for months or even years. In September 2012, Time Warner Cable and the National Football League ended a nine-year dispute primarily over NFL Network, and later, NFL RedZone Channel. The deal followed an earlier settlement between the NFL and Cablevision, making Time Warner the last major holdout. Time Warner had offered to carry NFL Network on a narrower sports tier and argued that the relative scarcity of annual games–eight, expanded to 13–did not justify the cost. SNL Kagan estimated the average subscriber fee at 95 cents per month. Some prolonged disputes are influenced by outside people and organizations. In 2003, New York City Mayor Michael R. Bloomberg helped arrange a deal between Cablevision and YES Network, which had kept many New York Yankees baseball games from being seen by some 3 million local subscribers for the first year of YES Network's run. In 2006, EchoStar dropped the female-oriented channel Lifetime for a competing channel, Oxygen. While Lifetime is partially owned by Disney, which in turn owns ESPN and ABC, the deciding factor for contract renewal came less from the parent company's clout than from a letter writing campaign spurred by the National Organization for Women, the YWCA, and other groups.

Blackouts have occasionally extended to broadcasters' websites. In the summer of 2013, CBS blocked access to all Time Warner Cable subscribers, whether or not they lived in the disputed regions. In 2014, Viacom blocked streaming video access to Cable One customers. Broadcasters argued that the practice closes a loophole: if distributors are to feel pressure from their subscribers, those subscribers should not be able to view the content elsewhere. Federal Communications Commission Chairman Tom Wheeler said the practice of extending blackouts to the Internet is of broad concern.

A February 2015 carriage dispute between Fox Sports 1 and AT&T U-verse produced a rare example of a partial blackout. When the parties could not agree, the channel did not disappear entirely from the U-verse lineup. Instead, the blackout only extended to programming added since its launch, including NASCAR events, Major League Soccer matches, and USGA golf events. FS1 maintained it was only seeking to get paid for the added value provided. AT&T U-verse called the additional fees "unreasonable".

A subsequent carriage dispute between Fox Corporation and Dish Network (which led to its cable networks and broadcast stations being pulled from the provider) affected the programming of a third-party channel. The NFL's Thursday Night Football package was technically owned by NFL Network, but was sub-licensed to Fox Sports as producer of the telecasts, and Fox held rights to simulcast a selection of the package on broadcast television. After the simulcast was unaffected on the September 26, 2019, game, Fox reportedly requested that the simulcast of the October 3 game on NFL Network be blacked out on Dish and Sling TV in solidarity with the pulled channels. However, due to carriage contracts that forbade NFL Network from performing programming substitutions that only apply to specific providers, the NFL forwent the simulcast entirely and quietly made the game exclusive to Fox. Dish reached a new agreement on October 6, 2019.

Another partial blackout involving a Fox-owned network began in August 2024; due to the 2021–2024 NCAA conference realignment, the Oregon Ducks, UCLA Bruins, USC Trojans, and Washington Huskies moved to the Big Ten Conference effective in the 2024–25 academic year. The conference's cable channel Big Ten Network (BTN)—which is majority-owned by Fox Corporation—charges lower carriage fees in non-Big Ten markets. However, Comcast had not yet reached an agreement to the in-market carriage fees for its systems in California, Oregon, and Washington upon the start of the season, with reports indicating that the provider sought to only carry in-market programming on BTN for subscribers to its sports and entertainment tier. As a result, BTN telecasts of west coast teams were blacked out for Comcast subscribers in California, Oregon, and Washington until October 10, 2024, when Comcast agreed to carry in-market BTN on its basic tier in these markets.

===== Streaming media =====
In 2019, the distribution of television programming on streaming media began to reduce the impact of carriage disputes on subscribers while weighing on cable companies and other traditional distributors. The primary driver was increased cord-cutting, in which consumers cancel their cable and satellite subscriptions in favor of content sent over the internet. Cord-cutting accelerated as streaming offerings gained a wider audience, and the cost of traditional cable bundles increased for both distributors and their subscribers.

On August 31, 2023, at the beginning of an 11-day dispute between Charter and Disney, Charter told investors that the cable model had become too expensive to be sustained in the wake of direct-to-consumer streaming services. The dispute blacked out ESPN, FX and other Disney channels for Charter's nearly 15 million subscribers. The resulting deal was notable for allowing Spectrum to resell some Disney streaming services at a discount while dropping eight Disney linear channels.

New York Times media reporter Benjamin Mullin wrote that "the resolution of the dispute could shape coming negotiations between Charter and other media companies." As cord-cutting continues, "a dwindling number of subscribers are paying rising fees for movies and TV shows that are increasingly being moved to streaming. Despite those challenges, cable TV is still enormously profitable, giving media companies an incentive to keep the business limping along as long as possible."

====== Streaming service blackouts ======
Occasionally, carriage disputes have led to channel blackouts on streaming services, echoing those affecting cable and satellite services. In 2020, YouTube TV and Hulu's live TV services lost access to Fox regional sports channels owned by Sinclair. YouTube TV also lost Sinclair's Tennis Channel.

In April 2021, the streaming media player company Roku removed Google's YouTube TV app from its channel store after the two companies' agreement expired. According to The Verge, the dispute showed "that even with long-established apps, companies on both sides may agitate to get the upper hand as the dynamic of power evolves toward TV's future." The companies resolved the dispute with a multi-year deal in December. Roku also declined to carry apps from HBO Max and NBCUniversal's Peacock when those services launched.

===== Aereo =====
In 2012, a carriage dispute of a different sort arose between Aereo, a small New York-based program distributor, and several major broadcasters, including CBS, NBC, ABC, Fox, Univision and PBS. Aereo used banks of small antennas to receive over-the-air signals from broadcasters, then made those signals available to subscribers via the Internet. But unlike other distributors, the company argued that, as an "antenna technology" company, it was exempt from paying retransmission consent fees, just as is any home viewer employing an antenna. Broadcasters countered that the Aereo service went beyond the conventional antenna because it both recorded programs for later viewing and charged subscribers a monthly fee, thus acting as a middleman. Aereo won its case in all but one lower court proceeding, including an April 1, 2013, ruling by the Second Circuit Court of Appeals. But in a 6–3 decision issued on June 25, 2014, the Supreme Court sided with the broadcasters, ruling that Aereo had violated copyright laws.

==== Canada ====
Under CRTC policies, most recently updated in 2015 with the introduction of a code of conduct known as the Wholesale Code, Canadian specialty channels may not pull their signals from television providers if they are at a standstill in carriage negotiations. Instead, the provider may continue to carry the network under the existing terms, and the parties are encouraged to enter into a "Final Offer Arbitration" process with the CRTC to resolve the dispute.

In 2019, a U.S. style carriage dispute emerged between Quebecor and Bell Satellite TV over its sports network TVA Sports. Quebecor had accused Bell of giving preference to its co-owned competitor and earlier entrant to the market, Réseau des sports (RDS), by relegating TVA Sports to a higher package tier than RDS, and not respecting the "fair value" of its services. Bell disputed Quebecor's demands for a higher fee, including accusations that it presented distorted ratings information. On April 10, 2019, Quebecor pulled the channels from Bell. In response, Bell offered a free preview of the English-language networks Sportsnet and TSN (RDS's parent network), which were both carrying current and upcoming events being televised by TVA Sports in French (including the 2019 Stanley Cup Playoffs and several Montreal Impact soccer matches respectively). On April 12, 2019, the Quebec Superior Court granted Bell a temporary injunction ordering Quebecor to restore the channels. In December, the CRTC ruled that Bell had shown undue preference to RDS in the packaging of its services, and ordered Bell to present a compliance plan by February 2020.

Foreign specialty channels available in Canada are not necessarily legally bound by the Wholesale Code, but are still expected by the CRTC to negotiate with Canadian service providers "in a manner that is consistent with the intent and spirit of the Wholesale Code". In any event, disputes involving foreign channels have been relatively rare, and public disputes even more so. AMC has had carriage disputes with Canadian providers from time to time, including a rare Canadian public dispute with Rogers Cable in 2013 (prior to the introduction of the CRTC's Wholesale Code), and several later occasions where providers provided advance notice that they might have to drop the channel; virtually all these disputes were resolved without AMC being dropped.

==== Europe, UK ====
In 2017, carriage disputes arose between Discovery and Sky in the UK and Germany, Com Hem in Sweden, DNA in Finland, and Boxer in Poland. The following year in Germany, Unitymedia and Vodafone settled disputes with public television broadcasters ZDF and ARD over broadcaster payment of carriage fees for cable distribution.

In November 2008, a 19-month dispute was resolved between Sky UK and Virgin Media that had removed Sky's basic channels. Ten years later, Virgin Media and UKTV resolved a weeks-long dispute that had blacked out all UKTV channels from Virgin Media. The settlement resulted in a five-fold increase in on-demand content available on the Virgin platform.

=== Proposed legislation ===
Some legislators have sought to dampen the effects of carriage disputes on subscribers by giving more power to the Federal Communications Commission. In 2010, then Senator John Kerry introduced draft legislation that would have given the FCC more oversight responsibility, with the power to monitor negotiations and impose binding arbitration if it deems discussions between broadcasters and distributors are not being carried out in good faith.^{[13]} In 2013, Representatives Anna Eshoo and Zoe Lofgren introduced the Video CHOICE (Consumers Have Options in Choosing Entertainment) Act, which would have enabled the FCC to prohibit channel blackouts during a dispute. The bill would also have prohibited broadcast channels from negotiating for carriage of its non-broadcast channels.

On the same day the Video CHOICE legislation was introduced, Representative Steve Scalise reintroduced legislation first drafted in 2011: the Next Generation Television Marketplace Act. The legislation, more far-reaching than CHOICE, would have repealed key provisions of the 1992 Cable Television Consumer Protection and Competition Act, including "must carry" and retransmission consent requirements, as well as compulsory copyright licenses stemming from 1976 copyright law. The legislative intent was that carriage negotiations for broadcast stations should play out on the same terms as those for non-terrestrial channels. Both bills, while given only narrow chances of passage, were generally welcomed by distributors and criticized by broadcasters.

A similar measure, The Modern Television Act of 2019, was introduced by Scalise and Representatives Anna G. Eshoo. The measure would repeal retransmission consent but not the must-carry rule, and would require distributors to carry a signal for up to 60 days after a contract has expired.

In January 2024, the Federal Communications Commission sought public comment on whether the agency should require carriers to provide rebates to compensate subscribers for blackouts. FCC Chairwoman Jessica Rosenworcel argued that blackouts amount to consumer bait and switch, with carriers delivering fewer channels than they promised when subscribers signed up. Commissioner Nathan Simington disagreed, contending that most blackouts are too innocuous to bother with. "And does the sports fan who was deeply impacted and personally offended by the blackout feel satisfied with a rebate that gives him change back from a Costco hot dog?" Also dissenting was the American Television Alliance, which argued that blackouts represent the efforts of service providers to save subscribers from ever higher subscription fees due to rising retransmission costs.

== Tradeoffs, consequences ==
As with all negotiations, carriage disputes involve tradeoffs for both parties. Distributors must weigh the effect of the carriage fees they pay on both their revenues and the fees they pass on to subscribers. Distributors also risk antagonizing their subscribers if they drop one or more channels from their lineup. For their part, broadcasters risk losing viewers, which in turn can reduce revenues from commercials and per-subscriber carriage fees. Financial consequences can ensue. Dish Network lost 156,000 customers in the fourth quarter of 2011 after a carriage dispute with Fox resulted in a loss of Fox Sports programming in October. AMC Networks' stock dropped by nearly five percent after the network's programming was dropped by Dish at the end of June 2012.

For distributors, much of the calculation hinges on whether programming content is so compelling that it is worth the retransmission fee. Sports programming provides a good example of how the calculation may favor either party.

In a 2013 dispute between CBS and Time Warner Cable, CBS's bargaining position improved as the National Football League season approached. In the wake of the settlement, the broadcaster increased its per subscriber fee from an estimated $.58 to between $1 and $2, setting a new standard for retransmission fees commanded by over-the-air broadcasters. CBS also retained digital rights to its contents for resale to online distributors. The agreement was expected to earn the broadcaster an estimated $1 billion to $2 billion in additional revenues by 2017.

On the other hand, some regional sports networks have seemingly overplayed their hand. CSN Houston, a partnership between the Houston Rockets, the Houston Astros and Comcast, was subsequently placed under bankruptcy protection after its October 2012 debut. While Comcast carried the channel, DirecTV, Dish Network and other competitors did not, citing the fee: $3.40 per month, one of the highest of any comparable channel. As a result, CSN Houston was unavailable to about 60% of the region's households. The owner of the Astros subsequently dropped high-salaried players, and the team finished the 2013 season with the worst record in baseball.

In January 2013, Time Warner Cable signed an $8.35 billion, 25-year contract with the Los Angeles Dodgers to carry and resell the Dodger-owned SportsNet LA. But in the 2014 season, the channel was only carried by TWC itself and a few smaller distributors, leaving about 70% of the region uncovered. TWC had reportedly asked other distributors for an initial $4 to $5 per-month per-subscriber, with carriage fees increasing yearly over the length of the contract. Those distributors, most notably DirecTV, balked at the terms. Los Angeles Times business reporter Joe Flint called the standoff a potentially "definitive moment for the world of sports programming, as the industry realizes that exorbitantly priced television deals can backfire." Other teams with whose regional sports networks did not gain traction include the Kansas City Royals and Minnesota Twins.

Some smaller cable companies, relying on revenues from broadband subscriptions, have been more willing to drop a bundled service, even at the cost of fewer television subscribers. In 2014, for example, Suddenlink, the seventh largest U.S. cable provider, entered into a lengthy dispute with Viacom, which continued even though Suddenlink lost 32,600 television subscribers over the first three months. But the company's net income was up 65 percent over the same period the previous year because it retained most of those subscribers as broadband customers. The conflict was only resolved in May 2017, after Altice USA acquired Suddenlink, and included it in a renewal with Viacom which also encompassed Altice's Optimum cable systems in New York.
