= American Broadcasting Cos., Inc. v. Aereo, Inc. =

- Supreme Court of the United States

Argued April 22, 2014 Decided June 25, 2014
- Full case name: American Broadcasting Companies, Inc., et al., Petitioners v. Aereo, Inc., f.k.a. Bamboom Labs, Inc.
- Docket no.: 13-461
- Citations: 573 U.S. 431 (more) 134 S. Ct. 2498; 189 L. Ed. 2d 476; 110 U.S.P.Q.2d 1961

Case history
- Prior: Injunction denied, Am. Broad. Cos. v. Aereo, Inc., 874 F. Supp. 2d 373 (S.D.N.Y. 2012); affirmed sub. nom., WNET v. Aereo, Inc., 712 F.3d 676 (2d Cir. 2013); rehearing en banc denied, 722 F.3d 500 (2d Cir. 2013); cert. granted, 571 U.S. 1118 (2014).

Holding
- Aereo's retransmission of television broadcasts was a "public performance" of the networks' copyrighted work. The Copyright Act of 1976 forbids such performances without the permission of the holder of the copyright.

Court membership
- Chief Justice John Roberts Associate Justices Antonin Scalia · Anthony Kennedy; Clarence Thomas · Ruth Bader Ginsburg; Stephen Breyer · Samuel Alito; Sonia Sotomayor · Elena Kagan

Case opinions
- Majority: Breyer, joined by Roberts, Kennedy, Ginsburg, Sotomayor, Kagan
- Dissent: Scalia, joined by Thomas, Alito

Laws applied
- Copyright Act of 1976

American Broadcasting Cos., Inc. v. Aereo, Inc., 573 U.S. 431 (2014), was a United States Supreme Court case. The Court ruled that the service provided by Aereo, which allowed subscribers to view live and time-shifted streams of over-the-air television on Internet-connected devices, violated copyright laws.

== Background ==
Cable companies are required by the 1992 Cable Television Consumer Protection and Competition Act to negotiate for retransmission consent, usually paying broadcasters for the right to carry their signals. Broadcasters argued that Aereo was a threat both to their business model by undermining the cable retransmission fees and the size of their audience. Because the fees that cable companies paid for broadcast content could comprise up to 10% of a broadcaster's revenue, broadcasters objected to Aereo's re-distribution of this content without paying any fees. Broadcasters have also identified Aereo as part of the cord-cutting trend among television audiences that poses a threat to broadcasters' advertising revenue.

In somewhat similar cases, the U.S. District Court for the Central District of California granted an injunction against Aereo's rival FilmOn, a similar service. However, the district court's injunction was legally binding only in its jurisdiction (including the West Coast of the continental United States, Alaska and Hawaii) and is currently being appealed to the Ninth Circuit Court of Appeals. Other competitors were blocked from providing service in Los Angeles and Seattle by similar injunctions.

=== Federal court ===
On March 1, 2012, two weeks before Aereo's initial launch in New York City, Aereo was sued for copyright infringement by a consortium of major broadcasters, including CBS Corporation's CBS, Comcast's NBC, Disney's ABC and 21st Century Fox's Fox. The broadcasters argued that Aereo infringed their copyrighted material because Aereo's streams constituted public performances. They sought a preliminary injunction against the company. On July 11, Federal Judge Alison Nathan denied this injunction, citing as precedent the 2008 Cablevision case, which established the legality of cloud-based streaming and DVR services. In response to the decision, the Aereo founder and CEO, Chet Kanojia, said, "Today's decision shows that when you are on the right side of the law, you can stand up, fight the Goliath and win." In a subsequent interview with CNET, Kanojia asserted, "With one step, we changed the entire TV industry. The television industry and its evolution are now starting towards the Internet and that was stopped until Aereo came along.... And I think as consumers start migrating to the Internet, new programming and new content are going to come in."

=== Second Circuit appeal ===
The plaintiffs appealed the decision to the U.S. Court of Appeals for the Second Circuit. Several other players in the industry, such as cable provider Cablevision, the Electronic Frontier Foundation, and the Consumer Electronics Association, filed amicus briefs. On April 1, 2013, the federal appeals court upheld the lower court's ruling by finding that Aereo's streams to subscribers were not "public performances" and thus did not constitute copyright infringement. The appeals court also affirmed the earlier district court decision that denied the broadcasters a preliminary injunction against Aereo. In response, News Corporation Chief Operating Officer Chase Carey stated that the company is contemplating taking Fox off the air and converting it to a cable-only channel: "We need to be able to be fairly compensated for our content... we can't sit idly by and let an entity steal our signal. We will move to a subscription model if that's our only recourse." Univision and CBS have also stated that they may also follow and convert to cable-only.

=== Supreme Court ===
In October 2013, the broadcasters filed a petition to the United States Supreme Court to take up the issue. On January 10, 2014, the Supreme Court agreed to hear the case. In February 2014, in advance of the case being taken up by the Supreme Court, a judge in the 10th Circuit Court of Appeals granted a preliminary injunction against Aereo, blocking the service within the 10th District, which includes Colorado, Kansas, New Mexico, Oklahoma, Utah, Wyoming, and Yellowstone National Park. On November 17, 2013, the National Football League and Major League Baseball filed a joint amicus brief to the Supreme Court that warned that sports programming would likely migrate from broadcast to cable television and that Aereo may put the US in violation of several international treaties, which prohibit the retransmission of broadcast signals over the Internet without their copyright holders' consent. The United States Department of Justice and United States Copyright Office also filed a joint brief in March 2014 that stated that Aereo's "system is clearly infringing." The Supreme Court heard oral arguments on April 22, 2014.

== Decision ==
The Court decided in favor of the broadcasters on June 25 in a 6–3 decision and remanded the case. The Court's decision describes Aereo as not being "simply an equipment provider" with an "overwhelming likeness to cable companies" that "performs petitioners' works 'publicly.'" Further, the Court adds that its decision should not discourage the emergence or use of different kinds of technologies.

Justices Scalia, Thomas and Alito dissented. Writing for the dissenting minority, Scalia quoted from Sony Corp. of America v. Universal City Studios, Inc. and noted that the broadcasters had made similar predictions regarding the VCR. Like the final paragraph in that previous ruling, he stated that the Court should be in no position to make judgements on novel technologies and that Congress indeed has the task of determining if copyright laws should be modified to address those issues.

The dissent continues and criticizes the majority's opinion calling it poorly reasoned because it relies on a "guilt by resemblance" standard, which states Aereo is performing because it "looks-like-cable-TV:"

That claim fails at the very outset because Aereo does not "perform" at all. The Court manages to reach the opposite conclusion only by disregarding widely accepted rules for service-provider liability and adopting in their place an improvised standard ("looks-like-cable-TV") that will sow confusion for years to come.

== Subsequent developments ==
Even though the United States Supreme Court held Aereo was "performing" the broadcasters copyrighted material because Aereo "looks-like-cable-TV" and was similar to community antenna television (CATV) systems, Aereo could not continue its service under a compulsory license as a cable provider would, it was later held.

Doing its best to turn lemons into lemonade, Aereo now seeks to capitalize on the Supreme Court's comparison of it to a CATV system to argue that it is in fact a cable system that should be entitled to a compulsory license under § 111. This argument is unavailing for a number of reasons.

On November 21, 2014, the company filed for Chapter 11 bankruptcy in the United States Bankruptcy Court for the Southern District of New York. It was later purchased by the DVR company TiVo for $1 million in March 2015.

== See also ==
- List of United States Supreme Court cases, volume 573
