= Locast =

Former American over-the-top streaming television service

- Developer: Sports Fans Coalition
- Type: Streaming television
- Launched: January 2018; 8 years ago
- Discontinued: September 21, 2021; 5 years ago
- Website: Archived official website at the Wayback Machine (archived November 13, 2021)

Locast was an American non-profit 501(c)(3) streaming television service that allowed users to view live streams of over-the-air television stations. The service was founded by attorney David Goodfriend under the banner of the Sports Fans Coalition.

Launched in New York City in January 2018, Locast expanded to media markets throughout the United States as well as Puerto Rico before suspending service on September 2, 2021 after an adverse decision by the United States District Court for the Southern District of New York centering on copyright issues.

Locast was similar to Aereo, which operated on a commercial basis with users paying to lease individual antennas placed in nearby warehouses. Aereo was shut down following a copyright infringement lawsuit by the major networks over the retransmission of their programming without consent and compensation. Locast was intended as a test case for the proposition that a service of this nature would be legal if operated on a non-profit basis.

Locast cited an exception in United States copyright law that allows retransmission of television signals by non-commercial entities at no charge, aside from that required to maintain the service's operations. Viewers were restricted from viewing stations outside of their market through geofencing on their viewing platform, though if traveling to another Locast market, they could view that market's stations instead.

Locast sourced its signals from antennas in each market it served. The service required a minimum donation of US$5 per month to view programming without interruption.

== Features ==
Locast was accessible via web browsers, Android and iOS apps, some set-top boxes, as well as Apple TV, Fire TV, Roku, Vizio SmartCast TVs and Android TV devices (the latter including the TiVo Stream), and could be cast to larger screens using AirPlay and Google Cast. After registering, viewers were presented with a programming grid from which to select a channel. Programming was periodically interrupted to solicit for donations until one was made; the suggested minimum contribution was $5.00 plus a 50¢ processing fee per month. The service offered no recording features.

== History ==
Goodfriend was a media legal adviser to an FCC commissioner and an executive at Dish Network. He conceived of Locast while lecturing at Georgetown University Law Center on the demise of Aereo, which operated from 2012 to 2014 and offered over-the-air television signals via streaming without negotiating with broadcasters for the privilege as required by the retransmission consent provision of the Cable Television Consumer Protection and Competition Act. Aereo attempted to justify its legality by leasing to users an individual antenna typically located in a nearby warehouse. After broadcasters sued, the U.S. Supreme Court ruled in 2014 that the company had violated copyright law. Aereo declared bankruptcy shortly afterward. Goodfriend surmised that a non-profit organization would be exempt from the provision; Locast became his proof of concept. "Locast" is a portmanteau of "local" and "broadcast".

Goodfriend initially funded the service via a line of credit from an undisclosed entrepreneur. The site then solicited user donations. In January 2018, Locast went online in New York as a service of the Sports Fans Coalition, a non-profit advocacy group chaired by Goodfriend. The city's television stations were neither notified nor compensated. Broadcast signals were received by a four-foot antenna mounted on the Trump International Hotel and Tower in Manhattan. Locast subsequently expanded the service to other U.S. media markets, as well as Puerto Rico.

Several television providers directed subscribers to Locast as a way of maintaining access to programming during carriage disputes, such as Charter Communications during a January 2019 dispute with Tribune Media, and DirecTV in a July 2019 dispute affecting CBS-owned stations. Both AT&T and Dish Network added Locast apps to their set-top boxes, including devices for DirecTV, AT&T U-Verse, and Dish via its Hopper set-top. In 2021, Sling TV integrated Locast's channels into Sling TV's program guide listing for some devices with possible future expansion to other devices.

By November 2020, viewer donations had offset expenses, sufficient to pay for operations and finance expansion into new markets. Capital costs for each location included leasing space for equipment, an antenna, servers and network services.

=== Legal challenge ===
In May 2019, New York Times reporter Edmund Lee wrote that Goodfriend's stated intention to quickly expand Locast nationwide "is basically a dare to the networks to take legal action against him. By giving away TV, Mr. Goodfriend is undercutting the licensing fees that major broadcasters charge the cable and satellite companies." In 2019, those fees exceeded $10 billion, according to the research firm Kagan S&P Global Market Intelligence, while adding about $12 to a monthly cable subscription fee.

On July 31, 2019, The Walt Disney Company, CBS Corporation, NBCUniversal, and Fox Corporation – the respective parent companies of ABC, CBS, NBC, and Fox – filed a lawsuit in the United States District Court for the Southern District of New York seeking a permanent injunction against Locast for infringing on the copyrights of their programming by retransmitting it without permission and compensation. The suit acknowledged that U.S. copyright law (17 U.S.C. § 111) allows non-profit organizations to freely retransmit programming, charging only for the costs of operations and maintenance of the equipment. The exemption was originally intended to cover third-party translator stations owned by non-profits and other organizations such as municipal and county governments. The broadcasters maintained that Locast has undermined its non-profit status, citing Goodfriend's previous ties to Dish Network, a donation of $500,000 made by AT&T, and both companies' promotion of the Locast service as complementary to their pay television services to dodge retransmission fees. The networks maintained that Locast gave the carriers an unfair negotiating advantage during carriage disputes that prevented them from retransmitting local programming.

On September 27, 2019, Locast answered the claim and filed a countersuit citing the aforementioned exception. Locast argued that it did not obtain any "direct or indirect commercial advantage" from the service, and that the networks were "[using] their copyrights improperly to construct and protect a pay-TV model that forces consumers to forgo over-the-air programming or to pay cable, satellite, and online providers for access to programming that was intended to be free." Locast accused the networks of engaging in collusion to effectively require viewers to use pay television services, including intentionally using low-end equipment on station transmitters to provide signals inadequate for serving the entirety of their market, and forbidding affiliates from streaming their programming online. Locast considered these tactics a violation of the statutory mandate for broadcasters to operate in the public interest. Locast also accused the networks of "threatening business retaliation and baseless legal claims against any current or prospective donors, supporters, or business partners", specifically alleging that YouTube TV had been threatened in this manner.

On October 25, 2019, the broadcasters filed a motion to dismiss Locast's antitrust claims, arguing that they were "an attempt to shift focus from Locast's wholesale infringement of the broadcast companies' copyrights". On March 30, 2020, the Electronic Frontier Foundation announced it was joining law firm Orrick, Herrington & Sutcliffe as defense co-counsel for Locast Goodfriend credited EFF, which is working pro bono, with eliminating what could have been Locast's single largest expenditure. In November 2020, Goodfriend guessed that the case could reach trial by mid-2021.

On April 23, 2021, both parties sent letters to U.S District Court Judge Louis Stanton. The broadcasters asked for a summary judgement in their favor. In their letter, they argued that Locast didn't qualify for a copyright exemption for three reasons: the exemption was intended for local retransmissions, whereas Locast's use of the internet gave it global reach; the service in fact operated for commercial advantage; and that the donations it requested were in fact charges to obtain uninterrupted service. The defendants in their letter asserted that Locast's services were exempt from copyright liability because they met five conditions: they were secondary retransmissions, not made by a cable company, made by a non-profit organization, without the intent of commercial advantage, and without charge other than to defray costs.

==== Ruling and reaction ====
On August 31, 2021, Stanton denied Locast's request for a summary judgment. He noted that Locast donations were used not just for system maintenance and operations, but for expansion of the service into new media markets. "Expansion is nowhere mentioned" in the law, he wrote, "and it is therefore excluded from the short, tightly-crafted grant of exemptions." He also ruled that because a donation is required to avoid service interruptions, it is therefore "not merely a recurring gift to a charitable cause." The opinion, while leaving open the possibility of a trial, represented a substantial legal setback for the service.

On September 2, 2021, after announcing it would no longer interrupt service to request donations, Locast suspended operations. The Electronic Frontier Foundation said the ruling "demonstrates once again how giant entertainment companies use copyright to control when, where, and how people can receive their local TV broadcasts, and drive people to buy expensive pay-TV services to get their local news and sports. We are disappointed that the court is enabling this callous profiteering that tramples on Congress’s intent to ensure local communities have access to news that’s important to people regardless of their ability to pay. The court made a mistake, and Locast is considering its options."

The broadcasters called the ruling "a victory for copyright law, vindicating our claim that Locast is illegally infringing copyrights in broadcast television content in violation of federal law." On September 15, the plaintiffs won a permanent injunction requiring Locast to shut down.

On October 28, 2021, the plaintiffs were awarded statutory damages of $32 million under the Copyright Act, payable by Locast's operator, Sports Fans Coalition NY. However, broadcasters ultimately agreed to settle for $700,000 plus the liquidation of some used computer servers.

== Availability ==
As of July 2021, the service was available to 179 million viewers in media markets representing 55 percent of the U.S. population, as well as across Puerto Rico. To use the service, a viewer had to be in one of these markets and could only watch channels local to that market.

2021 rank	Media market
1	New York City
2	Los Angeles
3	Chicago
4	Philadelphia
5	Dallas-Fort Worth
6	San Francisco
7	Atlanta
8	Houston
9	Washington, D.C.
10	Boston
11	Phoenix
12	Seattle
13	Tampa Bay
14	Minneapolis–Saint Paul
15	Detroit
16	Denver
17	Orlando
18	Miami
19	Cleveland
20	Sacramento
21	Portland, Oregon
22	Charlotte
24	Raleigh-Durham
25	Indianapolis
26	Pittsburgh
28	Baltimore
33	Columbus
37	Milwaukee
39	West Palm Beach
58	Scranton
81	Madison
100	Tri-Cities, TN-VA
109	Sioux Falls
148	Sioux City
169	Rapid City

== See also ==
- LocalBTV
- Puffer (research study)
