= Aereo =

Technology company

Aereo, Inc.
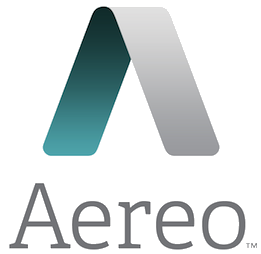
- Type: Private
- Founded: February 2012; 14 years ago
- Defunct: November 21, 2014; 11 years ago
- Fate: Bankruptcy, assets and intellectual property later acquired by TiVo
- Headquarters: New York City, United States
- Area served: Various US cities
- Key people: Chet Kanojia (Founder and CEO)
- Products: Over-the-air television on Internet-connected devices
- Website: www.aereo.com

Aereo was a technology company based in New York City that allowed subscribers to view live and time-shifted streams of over-the-air television on Internet-connected devices. The service opened to customers in March 2012, and was backed by Barry Diller's IAC.

On June 25, 2014, the Supreme Court ruled against Aereo in a case brought by several broadcast networks. The Court found that Aereo infringed upon the rights of copyright holders. The point of contention was whether Aereo's business model constituted a "public performance", which would legally require it to obtain permission from the copyright owners of any programs it transmits. The court ruled in a 6–3 decision that Aereo's business model was no different from that of a cable television provider, despite the differences in technology. As a result of that decision, their case was returned to the lower court, and the company announced on June 28, 2014 that it would immediately suspend its services while consulting with the court on how to proceed. Aereo's services were suspended on June 28, 2014 at 11:30 a.m. EDT and the company filed for Chapter 11 bankruptcy on November 21, 2014 in the United States Bankruptcy Court for the Southern District of New York. It was later purchased by DVR company TiVo for $1 million in March 2015.

== Service ==
Aereo leased each user an individual antenna and DVR situated in a remote warehouse that they could access over the Internet, allowing subscribers to view live broadcast television and to record the broadcasts for later viewing. The existence of an individual antenna for every user distinguished Aereo from purely internet-based streaming services. As of October 2012, Aereo could be used on Windows, Mac and Linux PCs with a compatible browser, or iOS devices including the iPad, iPhone, iPod Touch, or Apple TV (2nd and 3rd Generation) via AirPlay. Aereo could also be watched using a Roku box via a stand-alone app and, as of January 21, 2013, the updated app allowed onscreen navigation with the standard Roku remote control instead of using an iOS device as a remote.

As of June 2012, the service offered 28 channels, including all major broadcast channels. In August 2012, the company announced new monthly and yearly pricing options, $1 a day, and "Aereo Try for Free". Monthly plans started at $8 for 20 hours of DVR storage; there were also yearly subscriptions.

=== Availability ===
The service was originally available to customers in the New York City area, followed by the Boston area. The service was unavailable when customers ventured out of the normal broadcasting range for network television. Aereo had planned to launch in Chicago on September 13, 2013, but as of February 28, 2014, Aereo was still telling potential Chicago users the service was in Beta with no definite date of launch. At the end of 2013, six months before the service shut down, Aereo had about 80,000 subscribers including 27,000 located in the New York City area, 12,000 in the Boston area, and 10,000 in the Atlanta area.

=== Reception ===
Reviews of Aereo were positive, including one by The Wall Street Journal’s Katherine Boehret, who commented on Aereo’s “clean user interface that works well on iPad...and its video quality is startlingly good,” PC Magazine complained of the limited channel options and limited availability, but praised the interoperability of the service offered.

== Legal challenges ==
Cable companies are required by the 1992 Cable Television Consumer Protection and Competition Act to negotiate for retransmission consent, usually paying broadcasters for the right to carry their signals. Broadcasters argued that Aereo was a threat both to their business model, by undermining the cable retransmission fees, and the size of their audience. Because the fees cable companies pay for broadcast content can comprise up to 10% of a broadcaster's revenue, broadcasters objected to Aereo's re-distribution of this content without paying any fees. Broadcasters have also identified Aereo as part of the cord-cutting trend among television audiences that poses a threat to broadcasters' advertising revenue.

In somewhat similar cases, the U.S. District Court for the Central District of California granted an injunction against Aereo's rival FilmOn, a similar service. However, the district court's injunction is only legally binding in its jurisdiction (including the West Coast of the continental United States, Alaska and Hawaii) and is currently being appealed to the Ninth Circuit Court of Appeals. Other competitors have been blocked from providing service in Los Angeles and Seattle by similar injunctions.

On June 25, 2014, the U.S. Supreme Court ruled that Aereo's services breached copyright laws. It ruled that, "viewed in terms of Congress’ regulatory objectives, these behind-the-scenes technological differences do not distinguish Aereo’s system from cable systems, which do perform publicly", and that "insofar as there are differences, those differences concern not the nature of the service that Aereo provides so much as the technological manner in which it provides the service." As a result of the ruling, Aereo "paused" its services on June 28, 2014, and provided refunds. In an open letter to its customers, CEO Chet Kanojia disputed the decision, arguing that as their spectrum is provided for the public, "we believe you should have a right to access that live programming whether your antenna sits on the roof of your home, on top of your television or in the cloud."

After that decision, the company and its lawyers reversed legal strategy, arguing that they are entitled to a mandatory copyright license as a cable system, since the Supreme Court had ruled that they were one. The US Copyright office issued a letter disagreeing with the argument, but leaving it up to the courts to make a final decision. The district court later agreed with the Copyright Office that Aereo was not entitled to a cable compulsory license and granted a preliminary injunction against the service.

== See also ==
- iCraveTV – a similar service that operated in Canada
- LocalBTV
- Locast
