= Sling TV =

American streaming television service

Sling TV LLC
- Type: Subsidiary
- Industry: Pay television
- Founded: February 9, 2015; 11 years ago
- Headquarters: Meridian, Colorado, U.S.
- Area served: United States
- Key people: Gary Schanman (president)
- Products: Digital video recorder (Sling AirTV)
- Services: Streaming television; Over-the-top media service
- Members: ▼1.89 million users (as of May 9, 2025)
- Parent: Dish Network (EchoStar)
- Website: www.sling.com

Sling TV is an American streaming television service operated by Sling TV LLC, a wholly owned subsidiary of EchoStar. Unveiled on January 5, 2015, at the Consumer Electronics Show, the virtual multichannel video programming distributor aims to complement subscription video on demand services for cord cutters, offering a selection of major cable channels and OTT-originated services that can be streamed through smart TVs, digital media players and apps.

Sling TV is led by Erik Carlson, who also serves as the President and COO of Dish Network. The service's precursor, the international television service DishWorld, was also brought under the auspices of Sling TV LLC and was rebranded as Sling International. Following an invitation-only beta launch of the service that began in January of that year, Sling TV formally launched on February 9, 2015.

In November 2023, Sling TV had 2.12 million subscribers. In January 2025, Sling TV has 2.09 million subscribers. As of May 2025, Sling TV has a total of 1.89 million subscribers.

== History ==
Dish Network began to trial run an over-the-top ("OTT") internet television provider in 2012 with the launch of DishWorld, a service which provided access to over 50 ethnic and international television networks; DishWorld was initially made available through an app for Roku digital media players. In carriage deals that the company struck with major cable channel owners such as A&E Networks, The Walt Disney Company and Scripps Networks Interactive during 2014, Dish Network obtained the over-the-top distribution rights to their networks as part of clauses incorporated into the agreements pertaining to its existing direct broadcast satellite service – a move that served as a stepping stone for Dish towards launching a mainstream OTT offering. In November 2014, Dish Network chairman Charlie Ergen explained that the company planned to launch its OTT service by the end of that year and was aiming for the package to retail for around $30 per month. He explained: "the regular linear MVPD business is a mature business. You can't just go back every day and say 'I'm going to raise my rates to make my budget.' You have to figure out other revenue streams and get other people to pay for your product and watch more minutes of your product."

The OTT service was officially unveiled as Sling TV on January 5, 2015, in a presentation at the Consumer Electronics Show in Las Vegas; the service is co-branded with the Sling entity owned by Dish Network's former parent Echostar, which also co-branded and provided placeshifting technology for the provider's Hopper with Sling multi-room DVR system. Dish did not provide any specific details on when the service would be launched, beyond "soon." The company also announced that the DishWorld service would be absorbed into the Sling TV subsidiary and rebranded as Sling International, and that it also planned to launch a Sling Latino OTT service, which would incorporate various Spanish networks. Sling TV CEO Roger Lynch explained that the service was designed to target the viewing habits of the 18–35 demographic, which he believed was being ignored by the traditional pay television industry (and is also represented by its slogan, "Take Back TV"). Lynch argued the service's approach required Dish to be selective in how it built the service's lineup, stating that "it would have been easy for us to do deals earlier on if we just agreed to say 'let's just take these big pay TV packages and put them online.' We would have ended up with $60 or $70 bundles. We don't think that is the way to reach that demographic. We spent a lot of time working with programmers to make sure we had smaller bundles, lower costs and more flexibility." He also noted the importance of reaching a deal to include ESPN onto the service, which he felt was a sign of validity for the provider.

After a one-month, invitation-only beta, Sling TV officially launched on February 9, 2015. That same day, Sling announced that it had reached a carriage deal with AMC Networks, allowing networks such as AMC, IFC, BBC America and SundanceTV to be included as part of the service. One week later on February 16, as part of a renewed agreement between Dish and the Paramount Pictures/Lionsgate/Metro-Goldwyn-Mayer joint venture Studio 3 Partners to continue its carriage on the company's satellite service, Sling announced that it would carry Epix as part of its "Hollywood Extra" tier – in a package that includes its main channel and all three multiplex services – becoming the first premium channel to be made available on the provider.

Sling expanded its premium channel offerings on April 1, 2015, when Dish announced that it would add HBO to Sling TV as an add-on pack. Similar to the Epix deal, the addition of HBO was part of a wide-ranging deal between Dish Network and Time Warner that included the renewal of its carriage agreement for the Turner Broadcasting System's cable channels, including TBS, TNT, TruTV, CNN, Cartoon Network and Adult Swim. Sling added HBO as an add-on pack – which consists of the east and west coast feeds of the primary linear channel (although excluding its six multiplex services), and allows on-demand access to HBO's programming content – on April 9, 2015. The Sling Latino service was introduced on June 4, 2015, featuring two add-on Spanish-language programming tiers, "Paquete Total" and "Paquete Esencial." Customers can purchase two additional add-on packs, "Colombia" and "España." This service does not require the purchase of the "Best of Live TV" package. On November 19, 2015, Blockbuster LLC migrated the Blockbuster On Demand VOD service exclusively to Sling TV; as a result, Blockbuster and Dish Network began redirecting all Dish customers who subscribed to the service to switch to Sling in order to continue accessing its film content.

On April 13, 2016, Sling TV introduced a "multi-stream" package, which allows the ability for up to three users to stream different channels through a single subscription account. The package includes several networks owned by 21st Century Fox, including FX, Fox Sports 1, National Geographic Channel and the regional Fox Sports Networks, but excludes networks owned by The Walt Disney Company (including ESPN, ESPN2, Disney Channel, Disney Junior, Disney XD and Freeform) to hold the price of the tier at a moderated rate. Two months later on June 13, Sling added several channels to the multi-stream package: it added FS2, FXX and Nat Geo Wild among the Fox-owned offerings on the tier, and began carrying several channels owned by Viacom Media Networks (including MTV, VH1, BET, Spike, and Comedy Central). The Viacom deal – a caveat of a carriage dispute that Viacom and Dish Network resolved with a renewed agreement to keep Viacom's channels on the satellite provider – notably excluded Nickelodeon/Nick at Nite (although its three sister channels, the Nick Jr. Channel, Nicktoons and TeenNick, were included, with Nick Jr. being placed on the single-stream service's "Kids Extra" add-on lineup and in the core package, alongside Comedy Central and BET, on the beta multi-stream offering), while several of Viacom's other flagship networks (including MTV, VH1, CMT, BET, Spike and TV Land) were primarily relegated to the service's "Comedy Plus Extra" and "Lifestyle Plus Extra" add-on packs. In addition, the service added support to allow access to its content on Apple TV devices.

Sling restructured its programming tiers on June 30, 2016, redesignating the "Best of Live TV" single-stream tier as "Sling Orange" and the multi-stream package as "Sling Blue". Additionally, the service added most of the NBCUniversal family of networks (including USA Network, Bravo, Syfy, Golf Channel, CNBC, MSNBC, E!, Oxygen, NBC Universo, NBCSN and most of the regional Comcast SportsNet channels), as well as BBC America, BBC World News and Vibrant TV; the NBCUniversal channels joined sister service Local Now (an OTT-exclusive service of NBC-part-owned The Weather Channel), which initially launched as a Sling-exclusive offering on January 25. In addition, subscribers could also stream NBC stations in all markets where the network has an owned-and-operated station. With this, Sling began offering existing and prospective subscribers an upper-end tier comprising the channels featured on both Sling Orange and Blue, as well as those that are restricted to the respective tiers. Those subscribing to the "extra" add-on packs are required to subscribe to the Sling Orange tier in order to access the Disney–ABC Television Group channels and Sling Blue to stream the NBCUniversal channels included in the service's subtiers. Comcast SportsNet California, Comcast SportsNet Bay Area, Comcast SportsNet Chicago and Comcast SportsNet Mid-Atlantic were not among the CSN networks initially available in markets served by those channels, and would not be added to Sling until April 2, 2017.

On September 8, 2016, coinciding with the channel's September 10 premiere of Star Wars: The Force Awakens, Sling TV began carrying Starz as a premium add-on; its rollout was commemorated with a seven-day free preview of the Starz package to existing subscribers. The service also added the six regional Pac-12 Networks to its "Sports Extra" tiers, and added support for Windows 10 users through the launch of an app for the operating system. During October 2016, the service also added six additional channels to its lineup: Game Show Network (on the "Comedy Extra" tier), AXS TV (on the main "Sling Orange and Blue" lineup), HDNet Movies (on the "Hollywood Extra" tier), NHL Network (on the "Sports Extra" tier), Hallmark Channel and Hallmark Movies & Mysteries (both on the "Lifestyles Plus Extra" tier). On November 2, the OTT business news service Cheddar was added to Sling's base tiers, while Sling Kids and TheBlaze respectively joined the Kids Extra and World News Extra tiers; two weeks later on November 16, NBA TV was added to the "Sports Extra" tier.

In April 2017, Sling began offering Showtime as an add-on pack. The east and west coast feeds of the primary Showtime linear channel and its seven multiplex services are included in the package, which also grants access to Showtime's on-demand service; sister channels The Movie Channel and Flix have been excluded from the package ever since Showtime's addition to Sling. With the addition, Sling became the first over-the-top MVPD streaming service to offer all five major premium networks: HBO, Cinemax, Showtime, Starz and Epix. This was followed on April 5, with the introduction of the "Heartland Extra" add-on tier (including six newly added channels, FamilyNet, Outdoor Channel, Sportsman Channel, PixL, World Fishing Network and RFD-TV), and expanded its "Best of Spanish TV" tier with the additions of Estrella TV, V-me Kids and El Financiero-Bloomberg TV. Maker and Polaris TV were removed from the service in May 2017. On June 14, 2017, Sling TV moved the El Rey Network from the Orange package to the Comedy Extra add-on. However, the channel remained in the Blue package. Subsequently, on July 12, concurrent with the addition of Showtime Family Zone, Sling added WeatherNation TV to the "News Extra" add-on pack. On March 29, 2019, Sling TV added MLB Network and MLB Strike Zone to its "Sports Extra" package.

On July 24, 2019, Sling TV and Dish Network removed the regional Fox Sports Networks, as a result of Dish and Sling being unable to come to an agreement with Sinclair Broadcast Group, which had just acquired the networks from Disney (a byproduct of its acquisition of certain film and television assets from 21st Century Fox the year prior) through a joint venture with Entertainment Studios.

In February 2021, Sling added local stations to its guide from Locast in the 36 markets where that service is available. As of September 2021, Locast service has been discontinued, following a lawsuit held against them by broadcasting organizations.

In February 2023, the free portion of the service was renamed "Sling Freestream". At the time of the announcement, the plan was to offer users over 210 channels and more than 41,000 on demand titles, with additional content to be added throughout the year and an eventual goal of offering more than 400 channels. It would be available on LG, Samsung, and Vizio smart TVs.

In December 2024, Sling announced they would be increasing their prices by $6/month for the first time in almost 2 years, on their Orange and Blue base packages.

On June 6, 2025, it was reported that parent company EchoStar Corporation was preparing to file for Chapter 11 bankruptcy protection after the Federal Communications Commission (FCC) suspended EchoStar's ability to plan out strategic decisions for its Boost Mobile subsidiary. In addition, other factors contributing to this decision included missing over $500 million in interest payments and the termination of the Dish Network acquisition by DirecTV.

On June 29, 2026, EchoStar announced that Dish DBS, which operates Dish Network's satellite pay-TV business, as well as Sling TV and Boost Mobile, would file for Chapter 11 bankruptcy protection by June 30. EchoStar blamed the decision on heavy debt and subscriber losses, as well as legal troubles with federal regulators on whether it has met obligations to deploy wireless spectrum licenses. On June 30, Dish DBS filed for prepackaged Chapter 11 bankruptcy in Texas, listing assets and liabilities between $10 billion and $50 billion. The filing allows for Dish to pay its debt obligations and complete the transition of its Dish Wireless, which is doing business as Boost Mobile, following spectrum transactions. Dish plans to emerge from bankruptcy by the third quarter of 2026 with plans to wind down operations at Dish Wireless.

== Features and availability ==
Sling TV was originally not designed to be a full substitute for a "traditional" pay television provider, but as a complement to subscription-based online services. On February 22, 2017, Dish Network CEO Charlie Ergen said that although it was positioned as a complementary service, he considered Sling TV now to be "a direct replacement for cable and satellite."

The service originally had several limitations for contractual, economic, and technological reasons: only one stream could be used per account, there was no DVR functionality beyond the ability to pause and rewind programs, and the service did not offer local broadcast television stations or regional sports networks. Sling CEO Roger Lynch explained that including local broadcast stations and regional sports networks would drive up the price of the service from the high fees demanded by networks and station owners; he also cited that most cord cutters already have either an antenna or a subscription to a streaming service, such as Hulu, with which to view programming from the major broadcast networks. Despite these initial reservations, Sling has since begun offering owned-and-operated stations of ABC, NBC and Fox in select markets. As of October 2016, Sling TV does not carry CBS, Telemundo (either its national feed or local stations, nor its sister network NBC Universo, which has since been removed from the Sling Blue tier), affiliates of The CW and MyNetworkTV, member stations of PBS and its affiliated networks, and most independent stations. Sling subscribers with Channel Master DVR+ devices, which support antenna-based tuning capability, can access local broadcast stations independently of the Sling TV app.

On December 15, 2016, Sling TV began invitation-only beta testing of a cloud DVR that would allow subscribers to record programs from select channels carried on its programming tiers; initially available as part of a phased rollout to select Sling TV subs who access the service on Roku players and enabled television sets, the DVR allows up to 100 hours of recording storage, the ability to record multiple programs simultaneously, and automatically manages storage space to by deleting the oldest "watched" recording when the storage capacity becomes full to make room for additional recordings. The cloud DVR expanded to Amazon Fire TV subscribers through a "First Look" early access program, which allows users to purchase up to 50 hours of content storage with unlimited length of time to keep the programs. The DVR service was eventually expanded to other devices. In December 2019, 10 hours of recording time was provided to all customers with the option to upgrade to 50 hours. Due to contractual limitations, users are unable to record content from a small number of channels, such as SEC Network+, Local Now and ACC Network Extra. In January 2021, Sling TV upgraded all customers to 50 hours recording time, while the paid add-on was upped to 200 hours with unlimited length of time to keep. This was added in conjunction to a price increase for new subscribers.

In September 2020, Sling TV announced Sling Watch Party, a co-viewing feature that allows people from different locations to watch live TV together simultaneously. A unique function of Sling TV's implementation is the ability for text and video chat alongside live TV, which is an industry first. During the beta period, guests can join the Watch Party through free Sling TV accounts, however, the free access only lasted until September 30, 2020.

In addition to their selection of programming for paid subscribers, Sling TV offers a selection for free. Originally started as "Sling Free", viewers can watch ad-supported programming without signing up for an account on supported devices. In February 2023, the free portion of the service was renamed "Sling Freestream". At the time of the announcement, the plan was to offer users over 210 channels and more than 41,000 on demand titles, with additional content to be added throughout the year and an eventual goal of offering more than 400 channels. It would be available on LG, Samsung, and Vizio smart TVs.

== Supported devices ==
Sling TV content can be streamed via a number of platforms: at launch, these included Android and Apple iOS devices; Android TV; Apple TV; macOS, and Windows computers; LG and Samsung smart TVs; and Amazon Fire TV, Nexus Player, Roku, Xbox One, and Xbox Series X/S devices. (Streaming of ESPN networks through WatchESPN is also offered to subscribers.) On January 5, 2016, Channel Master added a Sling TV app to its DVR+ products via a firmware update, allowing users to access Sling content through the device's channel guide; because of clauses in digital distribution rights Dish Network maintains with content providers, Channel Master users cannot record channels through the Sling TV app.

Supported Sling TV devices include:

=== TV-connected ===
- Amazon Fire TV
- Android TV
- Apple TV (4th Generation and Apple TV 4K)
- Channel Master DVR+
- Chromecast
- Dish AirTV Player
- LG Smart TV (on webOS 3.0 or higher)
- Roku
- TiVo Stream 4K
- Vizio Stream 4K
- Xbox One
- Xbox Series X/S
- Xfinity Flex
- Xfinity (varies on the box model)
- Xiaomi Mi Box

=== Mobile ===
- Android mobile devices
- iOS mobile devices (10.x or higher)
- Chromecast (casting from phone to TV)
- FireOS

=== Computer ===
- ChromeOS
- Linux
- macOS
- Windows (Windows 7 or higher)
- Windows 10 and Windows 11 (app store)

=== Smart Home ===
- Echo Show
- Google Nest Hub

== Reception ==
Sling TV was named the CES 2015 "Best Home Theater Product", "Best Software/App", and "Best in Show" by Engadget, for its clear goal and pricing, its "intuitive, user-friendly and surprisingly well-done" interface, and the fact that the service "may very well be the beginning of the end for traditional pay TV" in the United States.

Some broadcasters have been hesitant about over-the-top services such as Sling TV, showing concern that they may undermine their carriage deals with larger conventional cable, satellite and Internet TV providers. Time Warner initially noted that the carriage of its channels on the service was only for a "trial" basis, while both Time Warner's CEO Jeffrey Bewkes and an analyst from investment firm Macquarie Capital claimed that current contract language in Dish's OTT carriage deals with the service's content distributors would cap the number of subscribers that the service is allowed to have at any given time to 5 million. Neither Dish Network or its content providers have confirmed any such cap.

On April 4, 2015, some Sling TV users were affected by brief outages preventing them from streaming portions of TBS' coverage of an NCAA Final Four game between the Duke Blue Devils and Michigan State Spartans, prompting criticism of the service's technical issues over social media. On April 6, 2015, Sling TV said that the errors, which affected between 1,000 and 2,000 users, were the result of network server failures caused by high volumes of subscriber traffic (including by new users that signed up in time for the Final Four), explaining that "while the viewing experience was spot on for the vast majority our customers, we were able to rebalance traffic loads for those who were affected [through traffic redirection to a different network provider] and improve the experience for the remainder of the evening." Roger Lynch later stated that the service would limit future outages by upgrading its software to automatically switch from the main to a backup provider during spikes in streaming demand.

In July 2015, Sling TV accused NBC Owned Television Stations, a division of Comcast's NBCUniversal unit, of refusing to air advertising for the service on NBC owned-and-operated stations in major markets as a form of protectionism. CEO Roger Lynch stated that "Comcast has a demonstrated history of shutting down ideas it doesn't like or understand, predictably to its benefit and at the expense of consumers."

== See also ==
- Bell Fibe TV
- IPTV
