= LocalBTV =

Over-the-top streaming television service

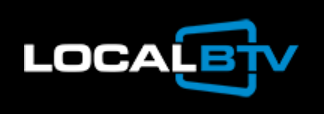
- Type: Streaming television
- Founded: October 23, 2017; 8 years ago
- Defunct: Status unknown
- Headquarters: Los Altos, California, United States
- Area served: National Channels (Nationwide); Local Channels (see markets served)
- Products: Over-the-air television on Internet-connected devices
- Parent: Didja

LocalBTV was an American streaming television service based in Los Altos, California and owned by Didja. The service allowed subscribers to view live and DVR recorded streams of over-the-air television as well as national channels on Internet-connected devices.

== Background ==
Similar in concept to the defunct services Locast and Aereo, LocalBTV offered local channels via streaming. However, LocalBTV had indicated they would only carry local channels that permit them to do so, thus avoiding the legal issues Aereo had, and more recently, Locast. LocalBTV's target customers was viewers who cannot receive local antenna reception, or their cable, satellite, or streaming service does not carry the local broadcast channel they would like to watch.

== Services ==
As of December 2022, none of the major networks were carried, but the service had hoped to carry them at a later time. Some of the channels that LocalBTV had carried were primary and subchannels such as Cozi TV, The Country Network, getTV and NewsNet as well as bilingual channels. Some of the national channels available everywhere in the U.S. included NOST, Cozi TV, FNX and getTV, and multiple shopping networks. Also included with the app for the service was a program guide and cloud DVR service. The service was free with an optional paid version planned at a later date.

In November 2023, the website went down and the various apps are no longer functioning on various platforms. As of December 18, 2023, their website returned with a message that their services were temporarily paused with plans to return soon. As of October 2024, the website was no longer available.

== Availability ==
LocalBTV's selection of national channels that were available in all markets in the United States. The selection of local channels on LocalBTV that were available in 53 media markets in the United States.

- Albany-Schenectady
- Alexandria, Louisiana
- Atlanta
- Austin
- Bakersfield
- Biloxi
- Bismarck
- Boston
- Charlotte
- Chicago
- Cincinnati
- Cleveland
- Columbus
- Columbus-Opelika
- Dallas
- Detroit
- Fargo
- Fresno
- Hartford, Connecticut
- Houston
- Indianapolis
- Jackson, Mississippi
- Las Vegas
- Los Angeles
- Louisville
- Miami
- Milwaukee
- Missoula
- Monterey
- Nashville
- New York City
- Norfolk
- Orlando
- Palm Beach
- Pensacola
- Philadelphia
- Phoenix
- Pittsburgh
- Portland, Oregon
- Raleigh
- Reno
- Sacramento
- Salt Lake City
- San Antonio
- San Diego
- San Francisco
- Santa Barbara/San Luis Obispo
- Seattle
- St. Louis
- Tampa
- Toledo
- Washington, D.C.
- Wichita-Hutchinson

== Supported devices ==
The service was supported on various platforms such as laptops, smartphones, as well as Amazon Fire TV, Apple TV, Android TV, and Roku streaming devices, including additional integration with Android TV's Live Channels app.

== See also ==
- iCraveTV
