= Cord-cutting =

Mass cancellation of cable television subscriptions

In broadcast television, cord-cutting refers to the pattern of viewers, known as cord-cutters, canceling their subscriptions to multichannel television services available over cable or satellite, dropping pay television channels, or reducing the number of hours of subscription television viewed, in response to competition from rival media available over the Internet. This content is either free or significantly cheaper than the same content provided via cable.

As a market trend, a growing number of "cord-cutters" do not pay for subscription television in favor of some combination of broadband Internet and IPTV, digital video recorders, digital terrestrial television and/or free-to-air satellite television broadcasts. A related group, the cord-nevers, have never used commercial cable for television service, relying on internet sources from the start. A number of purely internet television services, part of the wider IPTV concept, have emerged to cater to these groups.

In the third and fourth quarters of 2018, 1.1 million subscribers in the United States left traditional satellite and cable in favor of internet based streaming television. This decline continued into the first quarter of 2019 as cable and satellite lost 1.4 million subscribers. This trend is occurring globally as cord-cutting varies between 7% and 15% of households across multiple countries in Europe and Asia.

A 2021 study found that cord-cutter households "increase internet usage by 22%, reduce payments to multiple-system operators by 50%, and 16% acquire new over-the-top (OTT) video subscriptions".

== Market impact ==
Parks Associates estimated that in 2008, about 900,000 American households relied entirely on the Internet for television viewing; by 2017, this figure had increased to 22.2 million. Leichtman Research Group found that 6% of Americans watched at least one show online each week in 2008, a figure that grew to 8% in 2009. The number of Americans subscribing to cable service increased 2% in 2008, but the growth had slowed. Sanford C. Bernstein & Co. found that in the fourth quarter of 2008, the increase was seven-tenths of one percent, or 220,000 homes, the lowest ever recorded. A Centris report showed that 8% of Americans expected to cancel their pay-television service by the third quarter of 2009. About half of Americans tried to get a better deal from a provider other than the one they were subscribed to. Free-to-air catch-up, paid streaming services like Netflix and Hulu, niche interest services like Crunchyroll, and paid services offering cable television shows for cheaper like Disney+ and HBO Max, made canceling service possible for those who would be unable to see television programming over the air. Sports programming was a big reason for not canceling pay-television service, although online options existed for many events. Another problem was the inability to watch many programs live, or at least soon enough in the case of a television series.

2010 was the first year that pay-television saw quarterly subscriber declines. In the second quarter of 2012, Sanford Bernstein determined that losses took place in five quarters. Leichtman found that the decrease in pay subscriptions was not happening in large numbers. One reason was that some sports events, as well as other types of television (such as series airing on cable-originated networks), could not be seen online. Sanford Bernstein said the number of pay-television subscribers increased by 677,000 during the first quarter of 2010, and a poll conducted by The New York Times and CBS News showed that 88% of people surveyed had such a service, and only 15% had considered going exclusively to web services. People under the age of 45, the survey said, were four times more likely to use the Internet only. To combat the trend, pay television providers were allowing people to stream television programs on desktop, laptop and tablet computers. Craig Moffett of Sanford Bernstein still stated that high prices and other methods would eventually drive customers away, calling cord-cutting "perhaps the most overhyped and overanticipated phenomenon in tech history".

Comcast reported a loss of 275,000 subscribers in the third quarter of 2010, bringing the total for the calendar year to 625,000. The company said most of these losses were not from people leaving for another service. Moffett pointed out that cable companies needed to offer lower-cost packages, but a survey by Strategy Analytics revealed financial considerations were not the primary reason. People were not satisfied with what they could get, and online sources had a wider array of content. The survey showed that 13% of cable subscribers intended to cancel service in the next year. Slightly more than half were under the age of 40, and nearly all had a high school education. Two-thirds had or planned further schooling, and just over half earned at least $50,000 a year.

In second quarter 2011, Comcast lost 238,000 television customers, compared to 265,000 a year earlier, though the company was making up for these losses with increases in other services such as Internet. Moffett said the slowing rate indicated that online sources were not making people drop cable as quickly. On the other hand, Time Warner Cable and Charter Communications lost more customers in the quarter than in 2010. Time Warner Cable lost 130,000, while Dish Network lost 135,000; by comparison, DirecTV gained 26,000 subscribers, compared to 100,000 the previous year. Nielsen Media Research estimated that the number of households with at least one television set had decreased from 115.9 million to 114.7 million, while also estimating an increase in program viewing by computer, tablets or smartphones. Services such as U-verse were increasing their subscriber numbers by offering special features: U-verse's "My Multiview" option allowed people to watch four channels at once, while Cablevision's "iO TV Quick Views" allowed the display of up to nine channels at once.

A Nielsen report showed that during the fourth quarter of 2011, the number of people paying for television had dropped by 15 million people (a rate of 1.5%), and the number of cable subscribers dropped by 2.9 million. A 2012 Deloitte report said 9% of television households dropped cable service during 2011 and an additional 11% planned to cancel their service. Sanford Bernstein estimates 400,000 dropped pay video services during the second quarter of 2012, up from 340,000 in 2011. One reason for the drop was college students' returning home for the summer, while the companies made up for the loss in other quarters. However, the number of new homes paying for television service is fewer than the total number of new homes. Another possible reason is services, such as time shifting and live recording capabilities, that were once exclusive to pay-television services, are now being offered to cord-cutters. Although the number of subscribers usually increases in the third quarter, in 2012 only 30,000 people added pay-television service, according to a study by the International Strategy & Investment Group. Cable lost 340,000 subscribers (with Time Warner Cable accounting for 140,000 of that number) and satellite gained only 50,000; telephone companies added 320 subscribers. Throughout 2012, pay television added only 46,000 new subscribers, out of 974,000 new households overall, according to SNL Kagan. 84.7% of households subscribed, compared to 87.3% in early 2010.

A 2013 Leichtman survey showed that the 13 largest MVPD companies, covering 94% of the country, experienced their first year-to-year subscriber losses. Eighty thousand subscribers dropped their service in the year ending March 31, 2013. 1.5 million cable customers dropped their service, with Time Warner Cable losing 553,000 and Comcast losing 359,000 subscribers. AT&T and Verizon added 1.32 million subscribers; DirecTV and Dish added 160,000 subscribers, compared to 439,000 the previous year. Before 2013, only quarter-to-quarter losses had been recorded industrywide. Internet video and switching to receiving television programming by antenna were reasons. Bruce Leichtman described the subscription television industry as "saturated". A TDG study showed nearly 101 million U.S. households subscribed to television at the industry's peak in 2011, but the number fell below 95 million in 2017. In 2013, the number of total subscribers to pay-television services fell by a quarter of a million. This was the first decline from one year to the next.

Some broadcasters have elected to embrace the concept of cord-cutting by establishing subscription-based over-the-top content offerings of their own, such as HBO Now. Alongside the 2014 launch of CBS All Access, Les Moonves stated that there was a "very strong possibility" Showtime would also offer an OTT service—a plan which was realized in June 2015. On March 31, 2016, Canadian sports channel Sportsnet (owned by media and telecom conglomerate Rogers Communications) announced an OTT service offering its four regional feeds and two main national channels.

A TiVo survey showed that 19.8% of those without pay-television service had dropped it in the previous year. An apparent "deceleration" in 2018 turned out to be an increase in the number of households.

By 2019, the OTT market was deemed to have become oversaturated and fragmented, as the sheer number of services has led to increased diffusion of content among them, induced by studios using exclusive rights to their content as a selling point for their own new services (such as Disney+, HBO Max, and Peacock), and existing services (such as Netflix) being required to pay premiums to maintain rights to popular archive programs or lose them to rivals, and increase investment in original content as a selling point. Some critics have argued that the fragmentation of the market has defeated the purpose of cord-cutting, as consumers are now being required to spend money on multiple different services in order to access their desired content, and that these inconveniences (including fluctuating rights to popular content) may cause consumers to resort to piracy out of frustration.

A MoffettNathanson report said the first quarter of 2019 was the worst ever for cord-cutting, with an annual rate of 4.8 percent, and virtual MVPDs were not growing either.

By 2022, cord-cutting became the majority when the share of satellite and cable subscribers dropped to 48 percent.

In 2024, the phenomenon began to occur in Argentina as a result of an economic great depression. Cable providers like Flow and Telecentro has been affected by the crisis, making 2024 the first year of decline.

=== "Cord-nevers" ===
On November 28, 2011, a report by Credit Suisse media analyst Stefan Anninger said that young people who grew up accustomed to watching shows online would be less likely to subscribe to pay-television services, terming these people as "cord nevers". Anninger predicted that by the end of 2012, the industry's subscriber count would drop by 200,000 to 100.5 million; Anninger's report also stated that consumers were not likely to return to paying for television. In the case of land-line telephones, people had believed younger people would eventually get them, but now numerous subscribers only have mobile phones. Anninger predicted that the same would hold true for pay television, and that providers would need to offer lower-priced packages with fewer channels in order to reverse the trend. Also using the term "cord-nevers" was Richard Schneider, whose company Antennas Direct was selling antennas through the Internet. Schneider said that some of his prospective customers only knew of streaming video services, such as Netflix, and were not aware that broadcast television even existed. In a speech on November 16, 2012, Time Warner CEO Jeff Bewkes said "cord-nevers" did not see anything worth paying for.

=== Cord-shaving ===
In 2013, specific channels were losing more subscribers than pay television providers. This was because of what came to be known as "cord shaving", i.e., switching to a cheaper package of channels. Drastic changes in subscription fees influence the cord-shaving phenomenon, meaning that when prices go up, consumers are highly likely to downgrade subscription services to lower packages and complement them with cheaper OTT television services. The risk with the cord-shavers is that once this group is dissatisfied with pay-television services, they become cord-cutters. The cord-shaving phenomenon is highly likely to increase as fibre is rolled out to more areas in South Africa, and as data prices are reduced. In the United Kingdom, 36% of OTT television subscribers downgraded their premium pay-television services. A further 71% of OTT television subscribers have combined their subscription with pay-television subscription services owing to the inability of OTT television services to offer elite sport, and this phenomenon is called cord-stacking.

== Broadband-only TV products ==
In an effort to entice cord-cutters and cord-nevers, some cable television providers have begun offering Internet-only streaming services. Cablevision began to offer "Cord Cutter" packages that include a free digital antenna and access to its Optimum WiFi network, as well as the option to add HBO Now to the service, making it the first-ever cable provider to do so. In 2015, Comcast and Time Warner Cable (TWC) began to trial television services delivered via their managed internet infrastructures; Comcast's "Stream" service offered access to broadcast networks, HBO, Xfinity StreamPix, and their respective TV Everywhere services. Outside of TVE apps, the service can only be accessed via Comcast home internet on supported devices. In October 2015, TWC began to trial a service under which subscribers are given a Roku 3 digital media player to access their service via the supplied TWC app, rather than a traditional set-top box. A TWC spokesperson emphasized that this offering would provide "the same TV and same packages delivered to the home today", but delivered over TWC-managed internet rather than a cable line. This service has since been transferred to the current Spectrum service after Time Warner Cable's merger with Charter, with an equivalent Apple TV app forthcoming.

At the end of 2017, most new televisions had Internet capability, allowing access to both paid and free services with no need for a special set-top box. This contributed to the cord-cutting trend.
