= HD Radio =

Digital radio broadcast technology

HD Radio logo.

HD Radio (HDR) is a trademark for in-band on-channel (IBOC) digital radio broadcast technology. HD radio generally simulcasts an existing analog radio station in digital format with less noise and with additional text information. HD Radio is used primarily by FM radio stations in the United States, U.S. Virgin Islands, Canada, Mexico and the Philippines, with a few implementations outside North America.

HD Radio transmits the digital signals in unused portions of the same band as the analog AM and FM signals. As a result, radios are more easily designed to pick up both signals, which is why the HD in HD Radio is sometimes referred to stand for Hybrid Digital, not "High Definition". Officially, HD is not intended to stand for any term in HD Radio, it is simply part of iBiquity's trademark, and does not have any meaning on its own. HD Radios tune into the station's analog signal first and then look for a digital signal. The European DRM system shares channels similar to HD Radio, but the European DAB system uses different frequencies for its digital transmission.

The term "on channel" is a misnomer because the system actually sends the digital components on the ordinarily unused channels adjacent to an existing radio station's allocation. This leaves the original analog signal intact, allowing enabled receivers to switch between digital and analog as required. In most FM implementations, from 96 to 128 kbit/s of capacity is available. High-fidelity audio requires only 48 kbit/s so there is ample capacity for additional channels, which HD Radio refers to as "multicasting".

HD Radio is licensed so that the simulcast of the main channel is royalty-free. The company makes its money on fees on additional multicast channels. Stations can choose the quality of these additional channels; music stations generally add one or two high-fidelity channels, while others use lower bit rates for voice-only news and sports. Previously these services required their own transmitters, often on low-fidelity AM. With HD, a single FM allocation can carry all of these channels, and even its lower-quality settings usually sound better than AM.

While it is typically used in conjunction with an existing channel it has been licensed for all-digital transmission as well. Four AM stations use the all-digital format, one under an experimental authorization, the other three under new rules adopted by the FCC in October 2020. The system sees little use elsewhere as the DAB standard predominates outside North America and has been in widespread use since the 1990s.

== History ==
This standard was meant to supersede other existing stereophonic standards on AM.

iBiquity developed HD Radio, and the system was selected by the U.S. Federal Communications Commission (FCC) in 2002 as a digital audio broadcasting method for the United States. It is officially known as NRSC‑5, with the latest version being NRSC‑5‑E.

iBiquity was acquired by DTS in September 2015 bringing the HD Radio technology under the same banner as DTS's eponymous theater surround sound systems. The HD Radio technology and trademarks were subsequently acquired by Xperi Holding Corporation in 2016 as part of its merger with DTS.

HD Radio is one of several digital radio standards which are generally incompatible with each other:

- FMeXtra was a competing U.S. standard, but has been stagnant since the 2010s.
- Compatible AM Digital (CAM‑D) for AM stations.
- Digital Audio Broadcasting (DAB), also known as Eureka 147, is the most common standard in Europe.
- Digital Radio Mondiale (DRM‑30 and DRM+ configurations) was intended mostly for shortwave radio.

By May 2018, iBiquity Digital Co. claimed its HD Radio technology was used by more than 3,500 individual services, mostly in the United States. This compares with more than 2,200 services operating with the DAB system.

A 400 kHz wide channel is required for HD FM analog-digital hybrid transmission, making its adoption problematic outside of North America. In the United States, FM channels are spaced 200 kHz apart as opposed to 100 kHz elsewhere. Furthermore, long-standing FCC licensing practice, dating from when receivers had poor adjacent-channel selectivity, assigns stations in geographically overlapping or adjacent coverage areas to channels separated by (at least) 400 kHz. Thus most stations can transmit carefully designed digital signals on their adjacent channels without interfering with other local stations, and usually without co-channel interference with distant stations on those channels. Outside the U.S., the heavier spectral loading of the FM broadcast band makes IBoC systems like HD Radio less practical.

The FCC has not indicated any intent to end analog radio broadcasting as it did with analog television, since it would not result in the recovery of any radio spectrum rights which could be sold. Thus, there is no deadline by which consumers must buy an HD receiver.

== Technique ==
Digital information is transmitted using OFDM with an audio compression format called HDC (High-Definition Coding). HDC is a proprietary codec based upon, but incompatible with, the MPEG-4 standard HE-AAC. It uses a modified discrete cosine transform (MDCT) audio data compression algorithm.

HD equipped stations pay a one-time licensing fee for converting their primary audio channel to iBiquity's HD Radio technology, and 3% of incremental net revenues for any additional digital subchannels. The cost of converting a radio station can run between $100,000 and $200,000. Receiver manufacturers who include HD Radio pay a royalty, which is the main reason it failed to be fully-adopted as a standard feature.

If the HD receiver loses the primary digital signal (HD‑1), it reverts to the analog signal, thereby providing seamless operation between the newer and older transmission methods. The extra HD‑2 and HD‑3 streams do not have an analog simulcast; consequently, their sound will drop-out or "skip" when digital reception degrades (similar to digital television drop-outs). Alternatively the HD signal can revert to a more robust 20 kbit/s stream, although the sound quality is then reduced to conventional AM-level. Datacasting is also possible, with metadata providing song titles or artist information.

iBiquity Digital claims that the system approaches CD quality audio and offers reduction of both interference and static. However, the data rates in HD Radio are substantially lower than from a CD, and the digital signals sometimes interfere with adjacent analog AM band stations. (see § AM, below).

=== AM ===
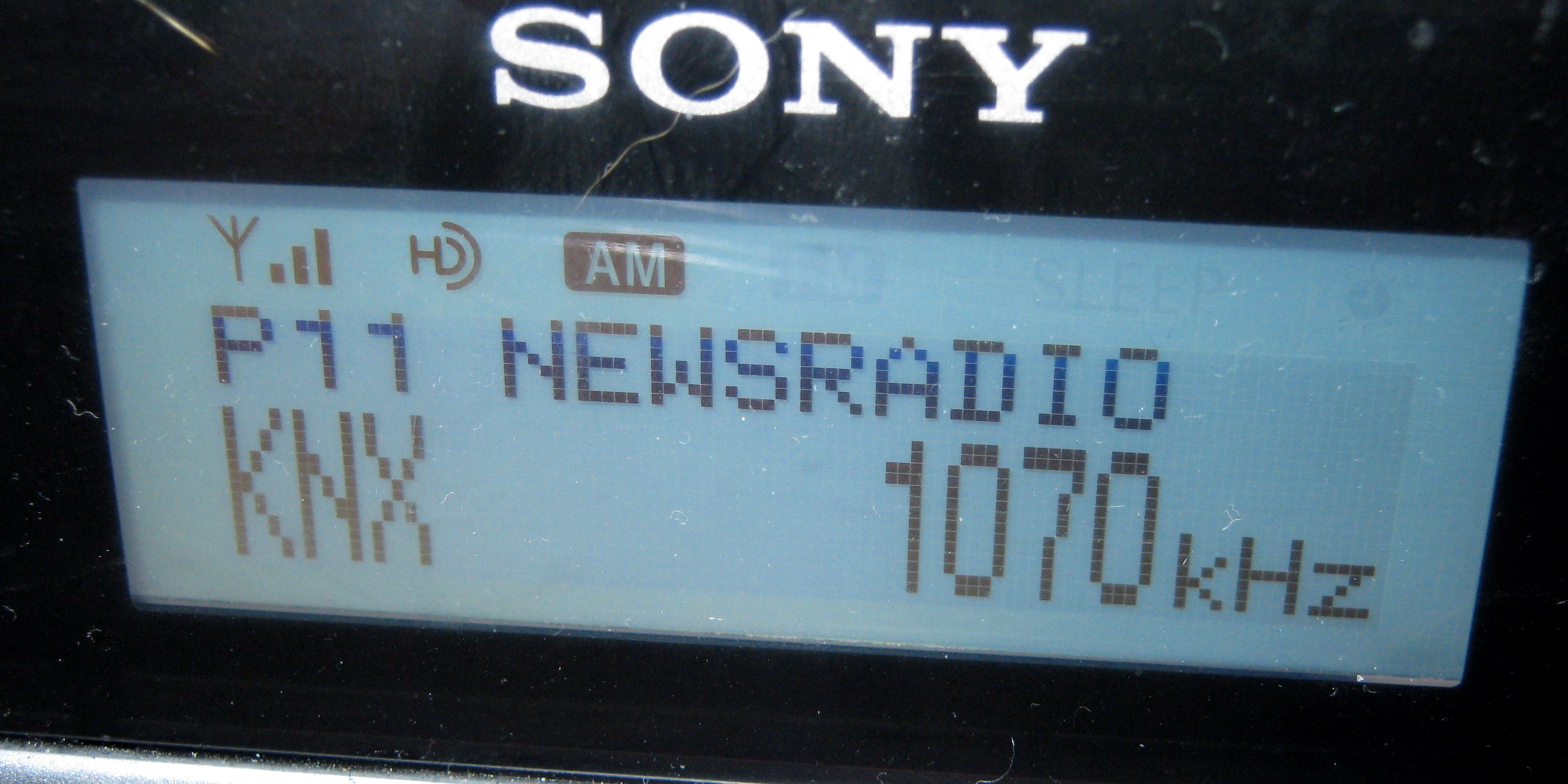
An example of information displayed by an AM HD station locking.

The AM hybrid mode ("MA1") uses 30 kHz of bandwidth (±15 kHz), and overlaps adjacent channels on both sides of the station's assigned channel. Some nighttime listeners have expressed concern this design harms reception of adjacent channels with one formal complaint filed regarding the matter: WYSL owner Bob Savage against WBZ in Boston.

The capacity of a 30 kHz channel on the AM band is limited. By using spectral band replication the HDC+SBR codec is able to simulate the recreation of sounds up to 15,000 Hz, thus achieving moderate quality on the bandwidth-tight AM band. The HD Radio AM hybrid mode offers two options which can carry approximately 40~60 kbit/s of data, with most AM digital stations defaulting to the more-robust 40 kbit/s mode, which features redundancy (same data is broadcast twice).

The digital radio signal received on a conventional AM receiver tuned to an adjacent channel sounds like white noise – the sound of a "hiss", or a large waterfall, or a strong, steady wind through a dense forest canopy, or similar.

==== All-digital AM ====
All-digital AM ("MA3") allows for two modes: "Enhanced" and "core-only".

- In enhanced mode, the primary, secondary and tertiary carriers are transmitted, allowing for a maximum throughput of 40.2 kbit/s while using 20 kHz of bandwidth out to the station's 0.5 mV/m contour. Inside this contour, stereo audio along with graphics (station logo and "artist experience" album artwork) and text information (the station's call sign, title, album, and artist) can be decoded by the receiver.

Beyond the station's 0.5 mV/m contour, typically only the primary carriers can be received, which restricts the maximum throughput to 20.2 kbit/s while only requiring 10 kHz of bandwidth.

- In core-only mode, the station only transmits the primary carriers.

When the receiver can only decode the primary carriers in either mode, the audio will be mono and only text information can be displayed. The narrower bandwidth needed in either all-digital mode compared to hybrid mode reduces possible interference to and from stations broadcasting on adjacent channels. However, all-digital AM lacks the analog signal for "fallback" when the signal is too weak for the receiver to decode the primary digital carrier.

Five AM stations have operated as all-digital / digital-only broadcasters, either on an experimental basis or under new rules adopted by the FCC on October 27, 2020, that allow any AM station to voluntarily choose to convert to all-digital operation.

- WWFD (WSHE since June 2024) was granted special temporary authority from the FCC in July 2018 to broadcast all-digital. It continues broadcast in digital-only mode under regular authorization.
- WMGG broadcast in all-digital mode from January 2021 until a new owner returned it to analog-only mode following a station sale in November 2021.
- WFAS broadcast in digital-only mode from May 2021 until its license was deleted in October 2024.
- WSRO broadcast in digital only-mode from December 2021 until the station went silent in March 2023. After a brief return to the air in 2024, its license was cancelled in March 2025.
- WYDE broadcast in all-digital mode from September 2023 until June 2025 when it returned to broadcasting in hybrid mode.

The FCC requires stations that wish to multiplex their digital AM signals to request and receive permission to do so. WWFD experimented with using a digital subchannel, operating a second channel (HD2) at a low data rate while reducing the data rate of the primary channel (HD1). In October 2020, the FCC concluded from WWFD's experiments:

"The [experimental] record does not establish that an audio stream on an AM HD-2 subchannel is currently technically feasible". In early 2020 the FCC rejected a multiplex request from WTLC.

=== FM ===
HD Radio DX during a tropo opening

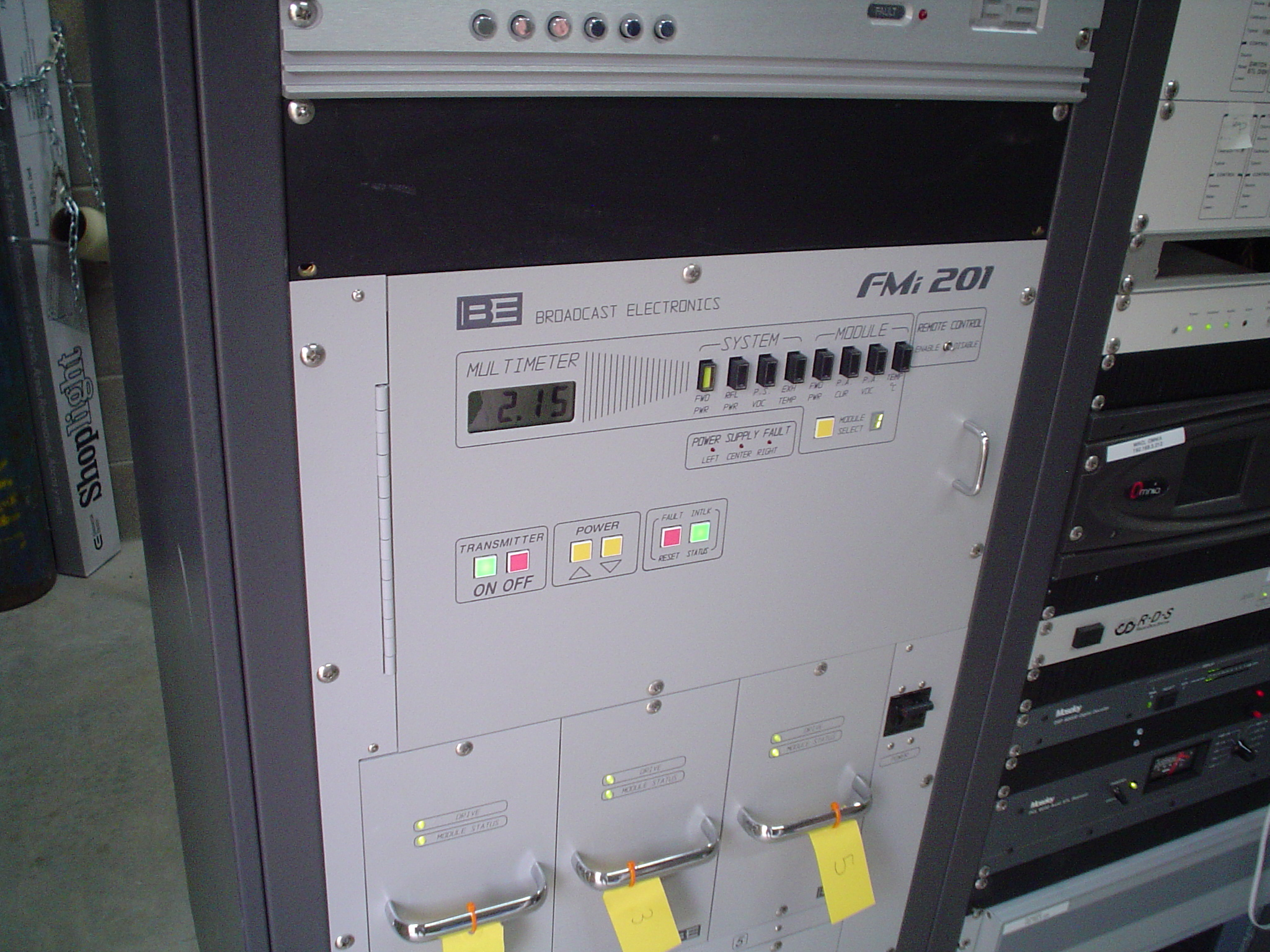
HD Radio transmitter

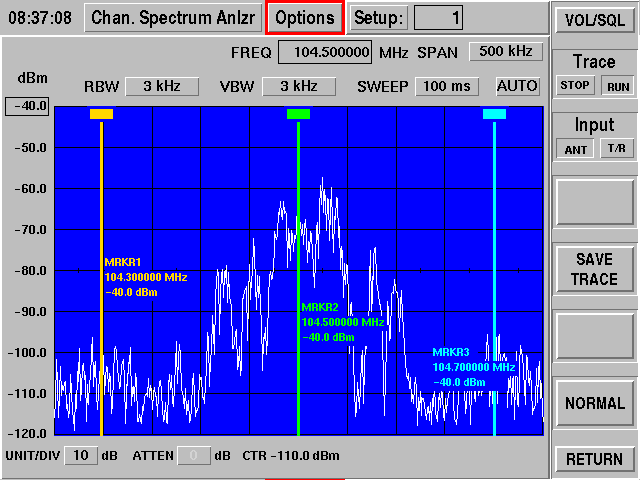
Spectrum of FM broadcast station without HD Radio

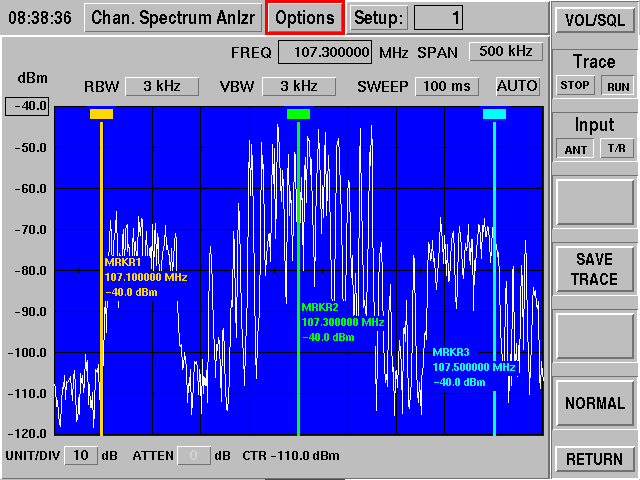
Spectrum of FM broadcast station with HD Radio

HD Radio Emergency Alert System test using KDKA-FM HD‑1

The FM hybrid digital / analog mode offers four options which can carry approximately 100, 112, 125, or 150 kbit/s of data carrying (lossy) compressed digital audio depending upon the station manager's power budget and desired range of signal. HD FM also provides several pure digital modes with up to 300 kbit/s rate, and enabling extra features like surround sound. Like AM, purely-digital FM provides a "fallback" condition where it reverts to a more robust 25 kbit/s signal.

FM stations can divide their datastream into sub-channels (e.g., 88.1 HD‑1, HD‑2, HD‑3) of varying audio quality. The multiple services are similar to the digital subchannels found in ATSC-compliant digital television using multiplexed broadcasting. For example, some top 40 stations have added hot AC and classic rock to their digital subchannels, to provide more variety to listeners. Stations may eventually go all-digital, thus allowing as many as three full-power channels and four low-power channels (seven total). Alternatively, they could broadcast one single channel at 300 kbit/s.

FCC rules require that one channel be a simulcast of the analog signal so that when the primary digital stream cannot be decoded, a receiver can fall back to the analog signal. This requires synchronization of the two, with a significant delay added to the analog service. In some cases, particularly during tropospheric ducting events, an HD receiver will lock on to the digital stream of a distant station even though there is a much stronger local analog-only station on the same frequency. With no automatic identification of the station on the analog signal, there is no way for the receiver to recognize that there is no correlation between the two. (Note: Station identification is sent by voice, or as RBDS data, but not all stations transmit RBDS.) The listener can possibly turn HD reception off (to listen to the local station, or avoid random flipping between the two stations), or listen to the distant stations and try to get a station ID.

Although the signals may be synchronized at the transmitter and reach the receiving equipment simultaneously, what the listener hears through an HD unit and an analog radio played together can be distinctly unsynchronized. This is because all analog receivers process analog signals faster than digital radios can process digital signals. The digital processing of analog signals in an HD Radio also delays them. The resulting unmistakable "reverb" or echo effect from playing digital and analog radios in the same room or house, tuned to the same station, can be annoying. It is more noticeable with simple voice transmission than with complex musical program content. (Note: Note that the "reverb" effect is limited to analog vs. digital receivers, or in rare cases, digital receivers with remarkably different circuitry. Multiple receivers that are all HD (of the same make and model, at least), or multiple receivers that are all analog, in the same room or house, will not produce a noticeable echo.)

Stations can transmit HD through their existing antennas using a diplexer, as on AM, or are permitted by the FCC to use a separate antenna at the same general location, or at a site licensed as an analog auxiliary, provided it is within a certain distance and height referenced to the main analog signal. The limitation assures that the two transmissions have nearly the same broadcast range, and that they maintain the proper ratio of signal strength to each other so as not to cause destructive interference at any given location where they may be received.

==== Artist Experience ====
HD Radio supports a service called "Artist Experience" in which the transmission of album art, logos, and other graphics can be displayed on the receiver. Album art and logos are displayed at the station's discretion, and require extra equipment. An HD Radio manufacturer should pass the iBiquity certification, which includes displaying the artwork properly.

==== EAS alerts ====
Since 2016, newer HD Radios support Bluetooth and Emergency Alert System (EAS) alerts in which the transmission of traffic, weather alerts, Amber and security alerts can be displayed on the radio. As with "Artist Experience", emergency alerts are displayed at the station's discretion, and require extra equipment.

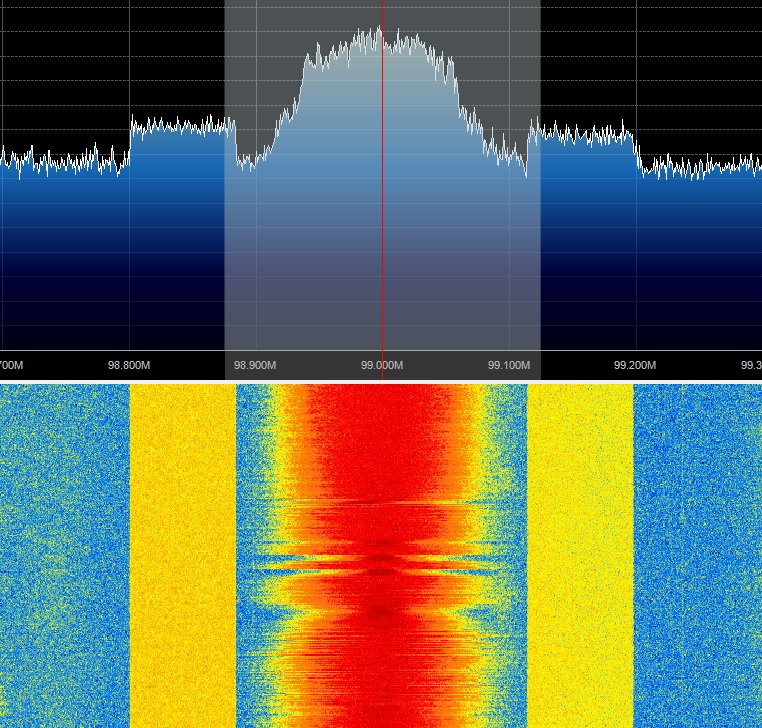
Spectrum of a HD Radio station as shown by a RTL-SDR USB device. The usual bandwidth of a regular FM station is visible as the marker width in the top image.

==== Bandwidth and power ====
FM stereo stations typically require up to 280 kilohertz of spectrum. The bandwidth of an FM signal is found by doubling the sum of the peak deviation (usually 75 kHz) and the highest baseband modulating frequency (around 60 kHz when RBDS is used). Only 15 kHz of the baseband bandwidth is used by analog monaural audio (baseband), with the remainder used for stereo, RBDS, paging, radio reading service, rental to other customers, or as a transmitter/studio link for in-house telemetry.

In (regular) hybrid mode a station has ±130 kHz of analog bandwidth. The primary main digital sidebands extend ±70 kHz on either side of the analog signal, thus taking a full 400 kHz of spectrum. In extended hybrid mode, the analog signal is restricted to ±100 kHz. Extended primary sidebands are added to the main primary sidebands using the extra ±30 kHz of spectrum created by restricting the analog signal. Extended hybrid provides up to approximately 50 kbit/s additional capacity. Any existing subcarrier services (usually at 92 kHz and 67 kHz) that must be shut down to use extended hybrid can be restored through use of digital subchannels. However, this requires the replacement of all related equipment both for the broadcasters and all of the receivers that use the services shifted to HD subchannels.

The ratio of power of the analog signal to the digital signal was initially standardized at 100:1 (−20 dBc), i.e., the digital signal power is 1% of the analog carrier power. This low power, plus the uniform, noise-like nature of the digital modulation, is what reduces its potential for co-channel interference with distant analog stations. Unlike with subcarriers, where the total baseband modulation is reduced, there is no reduction to the analog carrier power. The National Association of Broadcasters (NAB) requested a 10 dB (10×) increase in the digital signal from the FCC. This equates to an increase to 10% of the analog carrier power, but no decrease in the analog signal. This was shown to reduce analog coverage because of interference, but results in a dramatic improvement in digital coverage. Other levels were also tested, including a 6 dB or fourfold increase to 4% (−14 dBc or 25:1). National Public Radio was opposed to any increase because it is likely to increase interference to their member stations, particularly to their broadcast translators, which are secondary and therefore left unprotected from such interference. Other broadcasters are also opposed (or indifferent), since increasing power would require expensive changes in equipment for many, and the already-expensive system has so far given them no benefit.

There are still some concerns that HD FM will increase interference between different stations, even though HD Radio at the 10% power level fits within the FCC spectral mask. North American FM channels are spaced 200 kHz apart. An HD broadcast station will not generally cause interference to any analog station within its 1 mV/m service contour – the limit above which the FCC protects most stations. However, the IBOC signal resides within the analog signal of the immediately adjacent station(s). With the proposed power increase of 10 dB, the potential exists to cause the degradation of the second-adjacent analog signals within its 1 mV/m contour.

On January 29, 2010, the U.S. FCC approved a report and order to voluntarily increase the maximum digital effective radiated power (ERP) to 4% of analog ERP (−14 dBc), up from the previous maximum of 1% (−20 dBc). Individual stations may apply for up to 10% (−10 dBc) if they can prove it will not cause harmful interference to any other station. If at least six verified complaints of ongoing RF interference to another station come from locations within the other station's licensed service geographic region, the interfering station will be required to reduce to the next level down of 4%, 2% (−17 dB), or 1%, until the FCC finally determines that the interference has been satisfactorily reduced. The station to which the interference is caused bears the burden of proof and its associated expenses, rather than the station that causes the problem. For grandfathered FM stations, which are allowed to remain over the limit for their broadcast class, these numbers are relative to that lower limit rather than their actual power.

==== Asymmetric sidebands ====
In May 2025, the FCC confirmed it would permit asymmetric sideband levels to be used. The total power in the asymmetric side bands must not exceed that which would be permitted when the sidebands are symmetrical. The use of asymmetrical sidebands can reduce interference to an adjacent FM channel.

== Comparison to other digital radio standards ==
=== HD versus DAB ===
Some countries have implemented Eureka-147 Digital Audio Broadcasting (DAB) or the newer DAB+ version. DAB broadcasts a single multiplex that is approximately 1.5 megahertz wide (≈1 megabit per second). That multiplex is then subdivided into multiple digital streams of between 9~12 programs (or stations). In contrast, HD FM requires 400 kHz bandwidth – compatible with the 200 kHz channel spacing traditionally used in the ITU Region 2 (including the United States) – with capability of 300 kbit/s in digital-only mode.

The gradually phased out first generation DAB uses the MPEG-1 Audio Layer II (MP2) audio codec which has less efficient compression than newer codecs. The typical bitrate for DAB stereo programs is 128 kilobit per second or less and as a result most radio stations on DAB have a poorer sound quality than FM does under similar conditions. (Note: Holm, Steve (2007). Lydkvalitetet i DAB digitalradio [The sound quality in DAB digital radio] (research report) (in Norwegian). Digitale Utgivelser ved Universitetet i Oslo [Digital Releases from the University of Oslo]. Archived from the original on 1 May 2008. (in Norwegian) with Summary (in English). (Note: Holm (2007) The sound quality in DAB digital radio, Summary (in English): This analysis of the audio quality of DAB has been made independently of the broadcasting companies and aims at balancing their information. Through measurement of the audio signal and through informal listening, we have found that DAB suffers from several problems: The stereo image is smeared due to heavy use of joint stereo coding. Often the stereo image lacks focus and gives incorrect localization of instruments, in certain cases there is also incorrect balance between a vocalist and the background music.; The treble cut-off frequency is usually as low as 14 kHz and the result is a lack of brightness and a veiled sound stage. In particular young people will notice this degradation.; As young people are the target group for some of these stations, such as P3, this must be considered to be very undesirable. The reason is that the bit rates for all the channels in the Norwegian DAB network today are much lower than what scientific evaluation of audio quality has recommended, i.e. lower than 192–256 kbit/s which was projected when DAB was debated in Stortinget (Norwegian Parliament) in 1998. When the capacity is fully utilized, stations with music in the Oslo area use these bit rates: Three stations use 160 kbit/s with an audio quality similar to FM: P2, Alltid Klassisk1 and P4; Twelve stations use 128 kbit/s with lower quality than FM, incl. P1 and P3.; Two stations transmit in mono at rates of 80 and 96 kbit/s (Radio 2 Digital Moox and NRK Barn2); It would have been desirable to stop using 128 kbit/s as the standard bit rate for music, and use 160 bit/s instead. More demanding material should have the same quality as MP3 at 128 kbit/s, i.e. 192 kbit/s in DAB. As of today, there is not capacity to increase bit rates to these levels, so the DAB network has too low capacity with respect to requirements for decent audio quality. The broadcast companies want us to make a choice between FM, with the best audio quality in stationary receivers, and DAB which is best in a car. Today this is an unnecessary choice as there are no technological problems in making a digital radio which is better than FM on all accounts: Reception without garbling in cars; Capacity for all the stations one wants; Audio with near-CD quality; — Steve Holm (2007))) Many DAB stations also broadcast in mono. In contrast, DAB+ uses the newer AAC+ codec and HD FM uses a codec based upon the MPEG-4 HE-AAC standard.

Before DAB+ was introduced, DAB's inefficient compression led in some cases to "downgrading" stations from stereophonic to monaural, in order to include more channels in the limited 1 Mbit/s bandwidth.

Digital radio allows for more stations and less susceptibility for disturbances in the signal. In the United States, however, other than HD Radio, digital broadcast technologies, such as DAB+, have not been approved for use on either the VHF band II (FM) or medium wave band.

DAB better suits national broadcasting networks that provide several stations as is common in Europe, whereas HD is more appropriate for individual stations.

=== HD versus DRM ===
Digital Radio Mondiale (DRM 30) is a system designed primarily for shortwave, medium wave, and longwave broadcasting with compatible radios already available for sale. DRM 30 is similar to HD AM, in that each station is broadcast via channels spaced 10 kHz (or 9 kHz in some regions) on frequencies up to 30 MHz. The two standards also share the same basic modulation scheme (COFDM), and HD AM uses a proprietary codec. DRM 30 operates with xHE-AAC, historically with any of a number of codecs, including AAC, Opus, and HVXC. The receiver synchronization and data coding are quite different between HD AM and DRM 30. As of 2015 there are several radio chipsets available which can decode AM, FM, DAB, DRM 30 and DRM+, and HD AM and HD FM.

Similar to HD AM, DRM allows either hybrid digital-analog broadcasts or pure digital broadcasts, DRM allows broadcasters to use multiple options:

- Hybrid mode (digital/analog) - 10 kHz analog plus 5 kHz digital bandwidth allows 5–16 kbit/s data rate;
- 10 kHz digital-only bandwidth confined to ±5 kHz of the channel center allows 12–35 kbit/s;
- 20 kHz digital-only bandwidth using ±10 kHz (including half of the adjacent channels) allows 24–72 kbit/s.

On the medium wave, actual DRM bit rates vary depending on day versus night transmission (groundwave versus skywave) and the amount of bits dedicated for error correction (signal robustness).

Although DRM offers a growth path for AM broadcasters, it shares some issues with HD Radio in the AM:

- Shorter broadcast distance in hybrid mode compared to an analog AM signal
- Interference with adjacent channels when using the 20 kHz mode though in all-digital mode the signal fits inside the designated channel mask.

DRM+, a different system based upon the same principles of HD Radio on the FM band, but can be implemented in all the VHF bands (1, 2, and 3), either as a hybrid analog-digital or digital only broadcast, but with 0.1 MHz digital-only bandwidth, it allows 186.3 kbit/s data rate (compared to HD FM with 0.4 MHz allowing 300 kbps.)

Digital Radio Mondiale is an open standards system, albeit one that is subject to patents and licensing. HD Radio is based upon the intellectual property of iBiquity Digital Co. / Xperi Holding Co. The United States uses DRM for HF / shortwave broadcasts.

== Acceptance and criticism ==
=== Awareness and coverage ===
According to a survey dated August 8, 2007, by Bridge Ratings, when asked the question, "Would you buy an HD Radio in the next two months?", only 1.0% responded "yes".

Some broadcast engineers have expressed concern over the new HD system. A survey conducted in September 2008 saw a small percentage of participants that confused HD Radio with satellite radio.

Many first-generation HD Radios had insensitive receivers, which caused issues with sound quality. The HD Radio digital signal level is 10–20 dB below the analog signal power of the station's transmitter. In addition, commentators have noted that the analog section of some receivers were inferior compared to older, analog-only models.

However, since 2012, HD capable receiver adoption has significantly increased in most newer cars, and several aftermarket radio systems both for vehicles and home use contain HD Radio receivers and special features such as Full Artist Experience. iBiquity reports that 78% of all radio listening is done on stations that broadcast in HD. There are an increasing number of stations switching to HD or adding subchannels compatible with digital radio, such as St. Cloud, Minnesota, where many local radio outlets find a growing number of listeners tuning in to their HD signals, which in turn has benefited sales.

=== Different format and compatibility standards ===
Even though DAB and DRM standards are open standards and predate HD Radio, HD receivers cannot be used to receive these stations when sold or moved overseas (with certain exceptions; there are HD stations in Sri Lanka, Thailand, Taiwan, Japan, Romania, and a few other countries).

DAB and DRM receivers cannot receive HD signals in the U.S. The HD system, which enables AM and FM stations to upgrade to digital without changing frequencies, is a different digital broadcasting standard. The lack of a common standard means that HD receivers cannot receive DAB or DRM broadcasts from other countries, and vice versa, and that manufacturers must develop separate products for different countries, which typically are not dual-format.

Whereas the Advanced Audio Coding (AAC) family of codecs are publicly documented standards, the HDC codec exists only within the HD system, and is an iBiquity trade secret.

Similarly DAB or DRM are open specifications, while iBiquity's HD specification is partly open, but mostly private.

HD Radio does not use ATSC, the standard for digital television in the United States, and so fails to recover the former TV and FM radio compatibility enjoyed by TV channel 6 broadcasters. In the days of analog television, the lowest sliver of the FM broadcast band (87.7–87.9 MHz) overlapped with the FM audio carrier of U.S. analog television's channel 6; (Note: Former U.S. analog TV channel 6 occupied the upper end of the lower VHF TV band, which impinged on the lowest two channels of the FM broadcast band. License frequencies were carefully assigned to avoid overlap with geographically adjacent VHF TV stations on analog channel 6, and FM stations on 87.7 and 87.9 MHz.) because the NTSC analog television standard used conventional analog FM to modulate the audio carrier, the audio of television stations that broadcast on channel 6 could be heard on most FM receivers. In earlier days of television and radio, several television stations exploited this overlap and operated as radio stations. Full-powered television stations were forced to cease their analog broadcasts in June 2009, and low-powered stations ceased analog broadcasts by July 2021. Because the digital television and all digital radio standards are incompatible, HD receivers are not able to receive digital TV signals on the 87.75 MHz frequency, eliminating the former dual-medium compatibility of channel 6 television stations. Current low-power ATSC 3.0 channel 6 stations that broadcast an audio carrier on 87.75 do not have HD Radio.

=== Reduced-quality concerns ===
Promotion for HD Radio often fails to make clear that some of its features are mutually incompatible with other features. For example, the HD system has been described as "CD quality"; however, the HD system also allows multiplexing the data stream between two or more separate programs. A program utilizing one half or less of the data stream does not attain the higher audio quality of a single program allowed the full data stream. The FCC has declared

"one free over-the-air digital stream [must be] of equal or greater quality than the station's existing analog signal".

If the FCC disallows analog simulcasting, each station will have over 300 kbit/s bandwidth available, allowing for good stereo quality or even surround sound audio, together with multiple sub-channels, and to a lesser extent more freedom for low-power, personal FM transmitters, to pair modern smartphones, computers, and other devices to legacy analog FM receivers.

The broadcasting industry is seeking FCC approval on future HD receiver models, for conditional access; that is, enabling the extra subchannels to be available only by paid subscription. NDS (Note: NDS Group is a maker of digital media encryption technology.) has made a deal with iBiquity to provide HD Radio with an encrypted content-delivery system called "RadioGuard". NDS claims that RadioGuard will "provide additional revenue-generating possibilities".

Mostly all existing FM receivers tuned to a channel broadcasting a HD signal are prone to increased noise on the analog signal, called "HD Radio self-noise", due to analog demodulation of the digital signal(s). In some high fidelity FM receivers in quality playback systems, this noise can be audible and irritating. Most all existing FM receivers will require modifications to the internal filters or the addition of a post-detection filter to prevent degradation of the analog signal quality on stations broadcasting HD Radio.

=== Reduced analog signal ===
Radio stations are licensed in the United States to broadcast at a specific effective radiated power level. In 2008, NPR Labs did a study of predicted HD Radio operation if the digital power levels were increased to 10% of the maximum analog carrier power as is now allowed by the FCC under certain circumstances, and found the digital signal would increase RF interference on FM. However the boosted digital HD signal coverage would then exceed analog coverage, with 17% more population covered in vehicles but 17% less indoors.

=== High costs ===
The costs of installing the system, including fees, vary from station to station, according to the station's size and existing infrastructure. Typical costs are at least several tens of thousands of dollars at the outset (Note: HF Radio startup costs include transmitter, diplexer (or a new, separate antenna and feedline), and installation labor.) plus per-channel annual fees (3% of the station's annual revenue) to be paid to Xperi for HD‑2 and HD‑3 (HD‑1 has no royalty charge). Large companies in larger media markets – such as iHeartRadio or Cumulus Broadcasting – can afford to implement the technology for their stations. However, community radio stations, both commercial and noncommercial, in many cases cannot afford the US$1,000 yearly Xperi fee assessed to LPFM stations. During mid-2010, a new generation of HD Radio broadcasting equipment was introduced, greatly lowering the startup costs of implementing the system.

HD Radio receivers cost anywhere from around US$50 to several hundred dollars, compared to regular FM radios which can sometimes even be found at dollar stores. Although costs have historically been higher for HD hardware, as adoption has increased, prices have been reduced, and receivers containing HD Radio are becoming more commonplace – especially as more stations broadcast in HD format.

=== Power consumption ===
Conventional analog-only FM transmitters normally operate with "class C" amplifiers, which are efficient, but not linear; HD Radio requires a different amplifier class. A class C amplifier can operate with overall transmitter efficiency higher than 70%. (Note: "Transmitter efficiency" is actually the efficiency of the transmitter's final-stage amplifier. It is the ratio of RF power put out by the transmitter divided by the electrical power it consumes. Efficiencies differ by amplifier class, ranging over all classes from 25% at the worst-of-the-worst, to 90% at the best-of-the-best.) Digital transmitters operate in one of the other amplifier classes – one that is close to linear, and linearity lowers the efficiency. A modern hybrid HD FM transmitter typically achieves 50~60% efficiency, whereas an HD digital-only FM transmitter should manage just 40~45%. The reduced efficiency causes significantly increased costs for electricity and for cooling.

== Programming ==
Until 2013, the HD Digital Radio Alliance, (Note: The HD Digital Radio Alliance is a consortium of major broadcasters such as ABC, CBS, and iHeartMedia (then known as Clear Channel Communications).) acted as a liaison for stations to choose unduplicated formats for the extra channels (HD‑2, HD‑3, etc.). Now, iBiquity works with the major owners of the stations to provide various additional choices for listeners, instead of having several stations independently deciding to create the same format. HD‑1 stations broadcast the same format as the regular FM (and some AM) stations, and many of these stations offer one, two, or even three subchannels (designated HD‑2, HD‑3, HD‑4) to complement their main programming.

iHeartRadio is selling programming of several different music genres to other competing stations, in addition to airing them on its own stations. Some stations are simulcasting their local AM or lower-power FM broadcasts on sister stations' HD‑2 or HD‑3 channels, such as KFNZ-FM in Kansas City simulcasting 610 AM KFNZ's programming on 96.5 FM‑HD2. It is common practice to broadcast an older, discontinued format on HD‑2 channels; for example, with the recent disappearance of the smooth jazz format from the analog radio dial in many markets, stations such as WDZH‑FM in Detroit, Michigan, (formerly WVMV), WFAN-FM in New York City, and WNWV-FM in Cleveland, Ohio, program smooth jazz on their HD‑2 or HD‑3 bands. Some HD‑2 or HD‑3 stations are even simulcasting sister AM stations. In St. Louis, for example, clear-channel KMOX‑AM (1120 kHz analog and HD) is simulcast on KEZK-FM 102.5 FM‑HD3. KBCO‑FM in Boulder, Colorado, uses its HD‑2 channel to broadcast exclusive live recordings from their private recording studio. CBS Radio is implementing plans to introduce its more popular superstations into distant markets (KROQ-FM into New York City, WFAN‑AM into Florida, and KFRG-FM and KSCF‑FM into Los Angeles) via HD‑2 and HD‑3 channels.

On March 8, 2009, CBS Radio inaugurated the first station with an HD4 subchannel, WJFK-FM in Washington, D.C., a sports radio station which also carries sister sports operations WJZ-FM from Baltimore; Philadelphia's WTEL‑AM and WIP-FM; and WFAN‑AM from New York. (Note: Note however, that at some point, the WJZ-FM simulcast changed to a simulcast of Dallas, Texas, sister sports station KRLD-FM.) Since then numerous other channels have implemented HD‑4 subchannels as well, although with nearly 100% talk-based formats, because of the reduced audio quality. For example, KKLQ‑FM in Los Angeles operates an HD‑4 signal and aired The Mormon Channel which was 99% talk.

Public broadcasters are also embracing HD Radio. Minnesota Public Radio offers a few services: KNOW-FM, the MPR News station in the Twin Cities, offers music service Radio Heartland on 91.1 FM‑HD2 and additional news programming called "BBC News and More" on 91.1 FM‑HD3; KSJN-FM, the classical MPR station in the Twin Cities, provides "Classical 24" service on 99.5 FM‑HD2; and KCMP-FM, on 89.3 FM in the Twin Cities, offers "Wonderground Radio", music for kids and their parents, on 89.3 FM‑HD2.

KPCC‑FM (Southern California Public Radio), heard on 89.3 FM in Los Angeles, offers a digital simulcast of its analog channel on 89.3 FM‑HD1 and MPR's music service KCMP-FM on 89.3 FM‑HD2 in Los Angeles.

New York Public Radio in New York City, WNYC (AM) and WNYC-FM, (d.b.a. WNYC) re-broadcasts a locally programmed, all-classical service from WQXR-FM called "Q2", on 93.9 FM‑HD2. The service launched in March 2006. On October 8, 2009, the format was moved to WQXR‑HD2 (WXNY-FM) on 105.9 FM when WQXR-FM was acquired by New York Public Radio as part of a frequency swap with Univision Radio for their former frequency. The programming on the WNYC-FM‑HD2 channel now is a rebroadcast of WQXR-FM, in order to give full coverage of WQXR-FM programming in some form, as the 105.9 FM signal is weaker, and does not cover the whole area.

WMIL-FM in Milwaukee has offered an audio simulcast of Fox affiliate WITI‑TV on their HD‑3 subchannel since August 2009 as part of a news and weather content agreement between iHeartRadio and WITI‑TV. This restored WITI‑TV's audio to the Milwaukee radio dial after a two-month break, following the digital transition; as a channel 6 analog television station WITI‑TV exploited the 87.7 FM audio quirk as an advantage, in order to allow viewers to hear the station's newscasts and Fox programming on their car radios.

KYXY‑FM, operated by CBS in San Diego on 96.5 FM and offers their HD‑2 channel as one of the few "subchannel only" independent Christian music based formats on HD Radio. Branded as "The Crossing", it is operated by Azusa Pacific University.

College radio has also been impacted by HD Radio, stations such as WBJB-FM which is a public station on a college campus offer a student run station as one of the multicast channels. WKNC-FM in Raleigh, NC, runs college radio programming on HD‑1 and HD‑2, and electronic dance music on WolfBytes Radio on WKNC-FM‑HD3.

Some commercial broadcasters also use their HD‑2 channels to broadcast the programming of noncommercial broadcasters. Bonneville International uses its HD‑2 and HD‑3 channels to broadcast Mormon Channel which is entirely noncommercial and operates solely as a public service from Bonneville's owner, The Church of Jesus Christ of Latter-day Saints. That network of eight HD‑2 and HD‑3 stations was launched on May 18, 2009, and was fully functional within two weeks. Also, in Detroit, WMXD-FM, an urban adult contemporary station, airs the contemporary Christian K-Love format on its HD‑2 band (the HD‑2 also feeds several analog translators around the metropolitan area – see below), due to an agreement between iHeartMedia and K-Love owner Educational Media Foundation (EMF), allowing EMF to program WMXD-FM's HD‑2 channel. On a similar note, Los Angeles' KRRL 92.3 FM‑HD3 signal rebroadcasts EMF's Air1, and in Santa Barbara KLSB 97.5 FM airs K-Love on its primary frequency, and rebroadcasts Air1 on HD‑2 (though neither supports "Artist Experience"). In St. Louis, Missouri, WFUN 96.3-HD2 rebroadcasts K297BI for the classical music station Classic 107.3.

In July 2018, as part of a projected one year experiment, WWFD‑AM in Frederick, Maryland, became the first AM station to eliminate its analog transmissions and broadcast exclusively in digital.

=== Translators ===
Although FM broadcast translators are prohibited from originating their own programming, the FCC allows translator stations to rebroadcast an HD Radio subchannel of the primary station it is assigned to, instead of the programming of that station's analog signal. Station owners in large markets have taken advantage of this rule to allow HD subchannels to be heard on analog FM, or take AM licenses with attached translators silent while continuing to feed the translator.

Translators can also be used in a more traditional manner to extend the range of the full content of the primary station, including the unmodified main signal and any HD Radio sub-channels, in areas where the station has poor coverage or reception. Translators are not required to transmit an HD Radio signal, and the vast majority of existing translators do not.

== Receivers ==
=== Automotive and home/professional ===
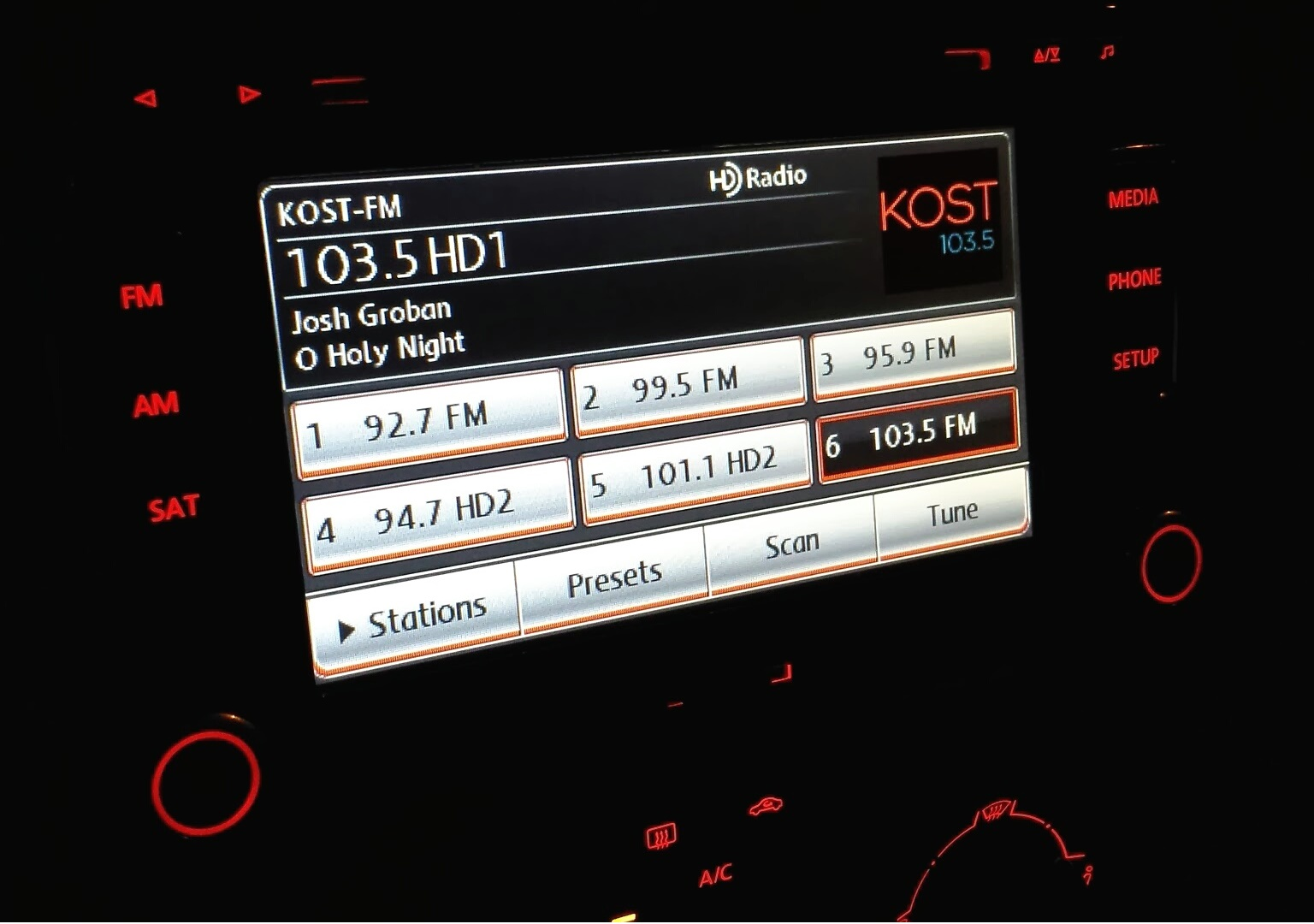
HD‑1 signal on KOST 103.5 FM in a Volkswagen RCD‑510 receiver

By 2012, there were several HD receivers available on the market. A basic model costs around US$50.

Automotive HD receiver manufacturers include:

- Alpine Electronics
- Clarion
- Delphi Corporation
- Directed Electronics
- Dual
- Harman
- Hirschmann Car Communication (Note: Hirschmann Car Communication GmbH is now a subsidiary of TE Connectivity.)
- Insignia (house brand for Best Buy)
- Jensen
- JVC
- Kenwood
- Pioneer
- Sony (discontinued)
- Visteon

Most car manufacturers offer HD receivers as audio packages in new cars, including:

- Ford
- Honda
- Hyundai
- Kia
- Mazda
- Nissan
- Subaru
- Tesla Motors
- Toyota
- Volkswagen

Home and office listening equipment is available from a number of companies in both component receiver and tabletop models, including:

- Audio Design Associates
- Boston Acoustics (discontinued)
- DaySequerra
- Denon
- DICE Electronics
- Directed Electronics
- Insignia
- Jensen Electronics
- LG (discontinued)
- Marantz
- McIntosh (discontinued)
- Onkyo
- Polk Audio
- Radiosophy (discontinued)
- Radio Shack (discontinued)
- Rotel
- Sangean
- Sony (discontinued)
- TEAC
- Visteon
- Yamaha

=== Portable ===
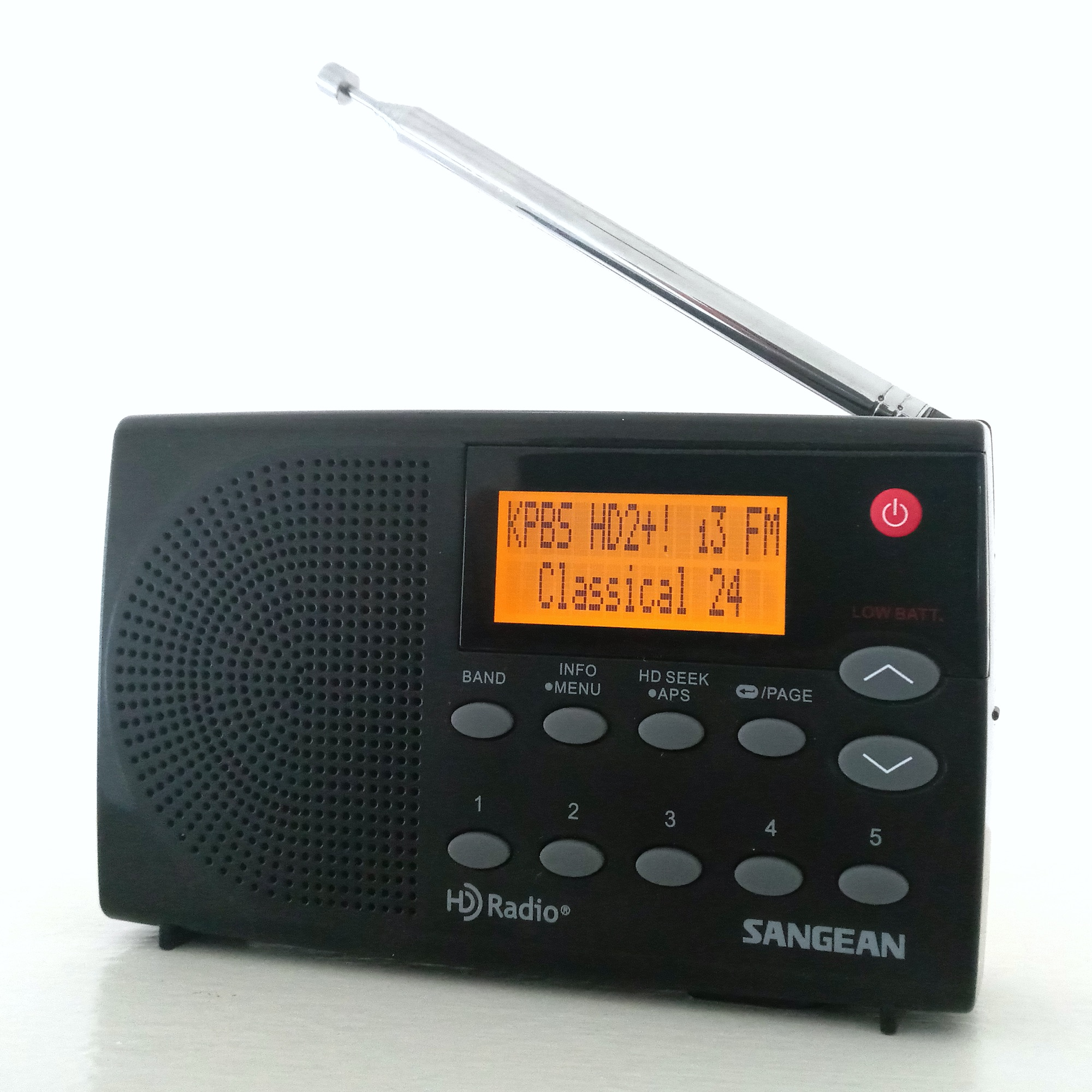
Sangean HDR‑14 portable receiver playing San Diego's KPBS-FM HD‑2 channel, "Classical 24".

Initially, portable HD receivers were not available due to the early chipsets either being too large for a small enclosure and / or needing too much power to be practical for a battery-operated device. However, in January 2008 at the Consumer Electronics Show (CES) in Las Vegas, iBiquity unveiled a prototype of a new portable receiver, roughly the size of a cigarette pack. Two companies made low-power chipsets for HD receivers:

- Samsung
- SiPort (Note: SiPort is a Santa Clara, CA, startup acquired by Intel in 2011.)

At least five companies made portable HD receivers:

- Coby Electronics Corporation produced the first HD portable – the Coby HDR‑700 portable HD receiver for both AM and FM.
- Griffin Technology produced an HD receiver designed to plug into the dock connector of an Apple iPod, or iPhone, with tuning functionality provided via software through the device's multi-touch display. This product was discontinued.
- Best Buy started selling the Insignia NS‑HD01, a house brand portable unit on July 12, 2009. It was the second portable HD receiver to come to the general market and featured FM‑only playback and a non-removable rechargeable battery which charges via mini USB. The Insignia unit sold in 2009 for around US$50 – the least expensive receiver available. Best Buy discontinued the NS‑HD01 model by September 2019 in favor of the NS-HD02.
- Microsoft released the Zune HD on September 15, 2009. It included an HD receiver embedded in the media device. The Zune HD was discontinued in November 2011 in favor of Windows Phones.
- Sangean Electronics produces multiple portable HD radios with AM and FM reception, like the Sangean HDR-14 portable receiver.

By 2012, iBiquity was trying to get HDR chipsets into mobile phones.
