= Twentieth Century Fox Film Corp. v. iCraveTV =

Copyright and trademark case in the USA federal courts

Twentieth Century Fox Film Corp v. iCraveTV
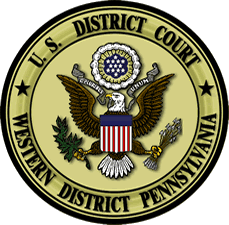
- Court: United States District Court for the Western District of Pennsylvania
- Full case name: Twentieth Century Fox Film Corporation, et al., v. iCraveTV, et al.
- Decided: February 8, 2000
- Docket nos.: 2:00-cv-00120; 2:00-cv-00121
- Citation: 2000 WL 255989; 53 U.S.P.Q.2d 1831

Court membership
- Judge sitting: Donald Emil Ziegler

Keywords
- Copyright Trademark

Twentieth Century Fox Film Corp v. iCraveTV, 2000 WL 255989 (W.D. Pa. 2000), was a court case in the United States District Court for the Western District of Pennsylvania which enjoined iCraveTV, a Canadian TV streaming website, from operating within the US after finding it in violation of 20th Century Fox's, and several other motion picture studios and television networks, copyrights and trademarks. Granted February 8, 2000, this injunction, along with continued legal pressure, led to the iCraveTV's demise just 3 months after its debut. As of March 28, 2019, the library is included due to Disney's acquisition of 21st Century Fox.

== Background ==
iCraveTV allowed users to stream network television directly through their personal computers via the internet. Broadcasts of 17 networks from Buffalo, NY and Toronto, Canada were picked up via a rooftop antennae in Toronto, turned into a retransmission signal, digitized, and then streamed online through the use of RealPlayer software at iCraveTV.com. The website was free for end-users however iCraveTV sold advertising spots to American and Canadian Companies. It displayed these advertisements alongside the streamed original content. The website launched quietly on November 30, 1999, but grew rapidly; in December 2000 it had 800,000 unique visits and played 60 million instances of users being exposed to 30 second advertisements.

Under Canada's Broadcasting Act retransmission of broadcast signals in this manner is legal within Canada. Because this retransmission is not necessarily legal in other countries, iCraveTV restricted use of its site to Canadian residents. Upon first visit to the site, users had to enter their 3 digit Canadian area code, verify that they were in Canada by clicking a box that said "I'm in Canada", and agree to the terms of use. International users, however, were easily able to bypass these restrictions and made up 45% of the traffic to the website.

== Positions Held in Court ==
The plaintiffs in this case included several sports leagues, motion picture studios, and television networks, such as the National Football League, Twentieth Century Fox Film Corporation, and the American Broadcasting Company. Plaintiffs contended that iCraveTV had copied and displayed several of their copyrighted works without their permission and that the site was too easily accessible within the US. The plaintiffs sought a preliminary injunction to prevent iCraveTV from displaying works in the US based on violation of the US Copyright and Lanham (Trademark) Acts.

iCraveTV representatives did not deny that they had copied copyrighted works, represented themselves as the authors, or publicly performed said works; rather they argued that their actions were legal in Canada, and that they did not intend for US residents to view the works on their site. Despite this argument, based on the precedent set in Williams Elecs., Inc. v. Attic Int'l, Inc., 685 F.2d 870, 878 [215 USPQ 405] (3d Cir.1982) injunctions may be issued without proving willful or deliberate infringement.

Regardless of where the broadcast originates, the Copyright Act gives jurisdiction to the district courts when the acts of infringement are committed within the US. In this case streaming constitutes an unauthorized public performance, which is a violation of the plaintiffs' rights as copyright owners. Public performance was proven by an examination of the Real Video server log showing that 45% of iCraveTV's traffic came from IP addresses within the United States. Additionally, plaintiffs presented testimony and sworn affidavits establishing that the Pennsylvania residents had accessed iCraveTV's website.

== Opinions of the Court ==
The court found that iCraveTV had directly and willingly infringed upon the rights of the plaintiffs under 17 U.S.C § 106 by making unauthorized copies of, preparing derivative works of (by removing subtitle data), and publicly displaying copyrighted works throughout the US. iCraveTV was also found to be liable for contributory infringement of the same works by knowingly and materially contributing to infringement by its users within the US.

iCraveTV was found to be in violation of the Lanham Act by portraying itself as legitimate telecasters endorsed by the plaintiffs, and falsely stating that they owned copyrights on the streamed content. Additionally, iCraveTV violated the plaintiffs rights under the Lanham Act by infringing upon and diluting they trademarks with the intent of leveraging the plaintiffs reputation and goodwill.

Under the common law of the Commonwealth of Pennsylvania, iCraveTV was also found to have participated in unfair competition and civil conspiracy that would irreparably harm the plaintiffs without an injunction.

On January 1, 2000, the court granted the Plaintiff's a temporary restraining order which enjoined iCraveTV from infringing upon the plaintiff's copyrights, trademarks, and trade names through any means including, but not limited to, online streaming.

== Subsequent Developments ==
Rather than returning to court as dictated by the preliminary injunction ruling, iCraveTV and representatives of the motion picture, television, and professional sports industries came to an out-of-court settlement agreement. The agreement stated that iCraveTV would no longer engage in illegal streaming of television signals into the US through the Internet. The settlement also prohibited iCraveTV from seeking (or helping anyone else seek) a ruling on the legality of their form of Internet broadcasting in Canada. In addition, the settlement required iCraveTV to withdraw a petition it made to Canada's Copyright Board asking for a suggestion on how much iCraveTV should be paying to fulfill the same copyright responsibilities met by other rebroadcasters. Following the settlement, iCraveTV Chief Executive Bill Craig agreed to shut down the site.

In September 2010, Seattle-based company ivi launched a similar service as iCraveTV for watching television online at a flat monthly fee. When a group of broadcaster and copyright holders filed copyright infringement claims against ivi that same month in WPIX, Inc. v. ivi, Inc., ivi argued that since the company simply retransmits unaltered content meant for the public, it meets the requirements necessary for the "passive carrier exemption" from copyright liability. Unlike iCraveTV, ivi did not frame its retransmission in advertising, an act which could arguably be considered a modification of the original content. In February 2011 the district court rejected ivi's argument, ruling that ivi's service did constitute copyright infringement and demanding the service shut down. In August 2012, an appeals court affirmed the decision.

In September 2013, graduate student Benjamin Klass filed a net neutrality complaint against Bell Mobility with the Canadian Radio-Television and Telecommunications Commission (CRTC) for its treatment of online video services. In response to this complaint, the CRTC sent a series of questions to Bell to investigate the issue. Canadian academic Michael Geist argues that these questions demonstrate the existence of an iCraveTV legal framework. Per this framework, services can protect themselves from prosecution by claiming either the retransmission provision of Canada's Copyright Act or the CRTC's new media exception order; they cannot claim both.
