= 20th Century Fox (disambiguation) =

20th Century Fox is the former name of 20th Century Studios, an American film production studio owned by The Walt Disney Company.

20th Century Fox or Twentieth Century Fox may also refer to:

- "Twentieth Century Fox", a song by 38 Special from their 1983 album Tour de Force
- "Twentieth Century Fox", a song by the Doors from their 1967 album The Doors
- Twentieth Century Fox Film Corp. v. iCraveTV, a U.S. copyright-infringement court case

== See also ==
- 21st Century Fox, former parent company of 20th Century Studios
