= Digital television in the United States =

Digital television in the United States is available via digital terrestrial television (DTT), digital cable, satellite television, and IPTV providers (including those delivered over private networks, and those delivered as over-the-top streaming television services over the public internet).

Digital terrestrial television (DTT) uses the ATSC standards, replacing the NTSC standards used for analog television, and offering capabilities such as high definition (HD) signals and digital subchannels. All full-power television stations in the United States were required to shut down their analog signals and transition exclusively to digital broadcasting by June 12, 2009. Class A low-power analog stations were required to transition by September 1, 2015, while all other low-power stations, as well as analog rebroadcasters, were required to transition by July 13, 2021.

In November 2017, the FCC approved ATSC 3.0 (Next Gen TV), an updated version of the ATSC standards that supports High Efficiency Video Coding (HEVC), video resolutions of up to 4K ultra high-definition (4K UHD), 120 Hz frame rate, high-dynamic-range (HDR) color, datacasting, and mobile television. Unlike the original digital transition, ATSC 3.0 is a voluntary standard, and broadcasters are not required to adopt it. However, those that do must continue to provide legacy ATSC signals with "substantially similar" programming.

== Standards ==
The U.S. opted to adhere to ATSC standards for broadcast digital television. These standards define, among other things, format and transmission criteria that ensure consistency, accessibility, and fairness for consumers and equipment manufacturers alike in the U.S., as well as international compatibility.

=== Format standards ===
The five main ATSC formats of DTV currently broadcast in the U.S. are:

- Standard definition—480i, to maintain compatibility with existing NTSC sets when a digital television broadcast is converted back to an analog one—either by a converter box or a cable/satellite operator's proprietary equipment
- Enhanced definition—480p, about the same quality as DVDs
- High definition—720p
- High definition—1080i
- High definition—1080p (only used by a few cable operators and some terrestrial stations broadcast in 1080p)

Most digital television sets sold in the U.S. use a display with a 16:9 aspect ratio to optimally display HDTV-formatted content. Lower-resolution sources like regular DVDs may be upscaled to the native resolution of the TV.

=== Transmission standards ===
==== Pay television ====
Digital cable television systems with an active channel capacity of 750 MHz or greater, are required by the FCC to follow ANSI/SCTE transmission standards with the exception of cable systems that only pass through 8 VSB modulated signals. Digital television sets (equipped with ATSC tuners) are often capable of viewing a baseline set of unencrypted digital programming, known as basic cable or low-tier channels, which typically include local network television affiliates.

According to FCC regulations, television providers must provide "separable security" for accessing encrypted programming. Until 2020, the FCC specifically mandated CableCARD, a smart card standard developed by an industry consortium, for this purpose.

==== Terrestrial ====
Digital television transmissions over-the-air (OTA) are available in metropolitan areas in the U.S., often carrying both standard-definition and high-definition (HDTV) transmissions of the same stations. As of the analog shut-off date of June 12, 2009, all full power OTA stations in the U.S. by law either transmitted their broadcasts digitally, or shut down.

Many stations used the switch to digital transmission as an opportunity to transition from 480i broadcasts to digital HD OTA broadcasts (either in 720p or 1080i), though this change is voluntary.

Within a distance of 35 to 40 miles from the broadcast stations, it is possible that a simple antenna (such as "rabbit ears") is adequate to receive a DTV broadcast signal OTA — at least some of the time for some of the channels. Any television equipped with an ATSC tuner may display DTV broadcasts properly. Some customers discovered that terrain, trees, rain, snow, wind, and movement of people around the room interfere with reception to one degree or another, from signals breaking up to total loss of signal. (Few modern ATSC-equipped televisions or converter boxes have internal antennas, in contrast to analog sets available in years past).

Broadcast TV signals in the United States are horizontally polarized.

== Transition from analog to digital terrestrial broadcasts in 2009 ==
It was estimated that as of April 2007, 28% of American households had an HDTV set, a total of 35 million sets, and that 86% of owners were highly satisfied with the HDTV programming All TV stations at that time were broadcasting in both digital and analog and major networks broadcast in HD in most markets.

While many in the industry wanted a flexible or delayed deadline, the FCC forced the issue at the behest of Congress. Many transition dates were proposed, but Congress finally fixed February 17, 2009 (later extending it until June 12, 2009), in law as the maximum end date for analog television authorizations.

In March 2008, the FCC requested public comment on turning over the bandwidth occupied by analog television channels 5 and 6 (76–88 MHz) to extend the FM broadcast band when the digital television transition was to be completed in February 2009 (ultimately delayed to June 2009). This proposed allocation would effectively assign frequencies corresponding to the existing Japanese FM radio service (which begins at 76 MHz) for use as an extension to the existing North American FM broadcast band.

On August 22, 2011, the United States' Federal Communications Commission announced a freeze on all future applications for broadcast stations requesting to use channel 51, to prevent adjacent-channel interference to the A-Block of the 700 MHz band. On December 16, 2011, Industry Canada and the CRTC followed suit in placing a moratorium on any future Channel 51 television station applications.

=== Early rollout of transition ===
On May 8, 2008, FCC Chairman Kevin J. Martin announced the agency would test run the transition to digital terrestrial television in Wilmington, North Carolina, beginning September 8, 2008. This test run was to work out problems that might have occurred before the complete transition.

== History ==
=== Development ===
In the United States, during the late 1980s, the FCC established an advisory committee to determine a new, advanced television standard for over-the-air terrestrial broadcasting. In June 1990, at the deadline for proposals, General Instrument Corporation's VideoCipher Division, based in San Diego, California, announced the development of the first all-digital HDTV broadcast system capable of delivering signals over normal-bandwidth satellite, cable, and over-the-air channels, and submitted it to the FCC for consideration. At the time, both Japan (NHK) and Europe (Philips, Thomson, et al) were developing analog HDTV systems, called MUSE and HD-MAC respectively.

General Instrument (GI), recognizing that digital HDTV would take many years for market development, focused its initial development plans on a digital standard definition system (digital SDTV) for satellite and cable TV distribution, receivable via digital set-top boxes for display on the installed base of pre-existing television sets. Because there were no technical standards yet for digital TV, GI's initial proprietary digital TV system comprised: (a) its advanced video compression algorithms; (b) a new digital transmission system (digital modulation and forward error correction for satellite and cable delivery); and (c) a conditional access and encryption system for content security and monetization by media companies.

At the September 1990 International Broadcasting Convention (IBC) in Brighton, England, GI demonstrated its DigiCipher digital television system, incorporating a flexible degree of compression from 2:1 (HD) and up to 10:1 (SD) channels within a single satellite transponder or cable TV channel. The advent of digital SDTV television meant that future satellite TV services could deliver hundreds of digital TV channels through a single communications satellite to small home dishes. It also meant cable operators could use digital television technology to expand their content offerings and improve video quality.

Meanwhile, the FCC proceeded with its advanced television standard for over-the-air terrestrial broadcasting through its Advanced Television Systems Committee (ATSC) and the Advanced Television Test Center (ATTC). Two analog systems (from the Philips/Thomson/Sarnoff/NBC consortium and NHK's Narrow-MUSE system) and four digital HDTV prototypes were tested sequentially by the FCC's Advanced Television Test Center in summer 1991 through summer 1992. They were developed by: 1. General Instrument; 2. a competing consortium comprising Philips, Thomson, Sarnoff Labs, and NBC; 3. another alliance of Zenith Electronics and AT&T; and 4. MIT (in partnership with GI). After the competitive testing phase, the various companies were encouraged to come together in a "Grand Alliance," with a goal of combining the various technologies into a unified digital HDTV broadcast system. Key technical elements of the system included MPEG-2 video (with interlaced and progressive formats), Dolby AC-3 audio, MPEG-2 transport, System Information (SI) tables, and 8-VSB transmission.

Standards bodies, such as MPEG-2, ATSC, and DVB, developed digital TV-related technical standards through the 1990s, and these activities are ongoing with new technology generations. Standardization was important because it led to a more competitive market environment for technology providers and service providers. Over time, GI's early proprietary digital TV systems were superseded by competing standards-based products not only from GI (acquired by Motorola in 2000) but also from Scientific-Atlanta (acquired by Cisco in 2006), Harmonic, Tandberg (acquired by Ericsson in 2007), Philips, Thomson, and many others.

=== Market launches of digital SDTV and digital HDTV ===
In June 1992, General Instrument and HBO commenced a field trial of GI's DigiCipher SDTV system for transmission from HBO's Hauppauge, NY satellite uplink site to cable headends throughout the U.S. HBO executives wanted to determine whether, by offering subscribers a digital multiplex service with different genres, it could create a "stickier" and more valuable content package for its subscriber base. The GI/HBO field trial was successful from both a technical and marketing perspective, and HBO started making roll-out plans while simultaneously coordinating with the major cable operators such as TCI and Time Warner regarding how these leading US cable companies planned to proceed with digital cable TV.Meanwhile, various international satellite television programmers decided early on to also make use of GI's digital satellite TV technology including Rogers in Canada, Multivision in Mexico City, Telefe in Argentina, BBC World Service, Middle East Broadcasting Centre (MBC) delivered from London, PBS, and Viacom.

The US cable industry, however, decided that with the MPEG-2 standard specifications approaching finalization, they would wait for GI's MPEG-2 based system for delivery of digital SDTV over cable. Various US programmers (e.g., HBO, Showtime, Disney, ESPN, PBS, Discovery) wanted to go digital right away, however, for content expansion and bandwidth efficiency reasons, deploying digital (SDTV) satellite signals to cable headends, with GI agreeing to upgrade the original DigiCipher technology to its MPEG-2 compatible system (DigiCipher II) when it became available. John Malone, the chairman/CEO of TCI, strategically saw the competitive threat of high-power DBS satellite operators (e.g., Hughes Communications' planned DirecTV service), and negotiated a large contract with GI for MPEG-2 digital cable boxes so that TCI and its cable cohorts could also take advantage of the digital TV revolution.

The PrimeStar satellite service became the world's first digital TV service to consumers' homes, launching with GI's DigiCipher system on March 22, 1994. (PrimeStar was later acquired by DirecTV).

DirecTV launched next, with its digital satellite platform in the summer of 1994, using the Digital Satellite System (DSS) system and technology from Compression Labs (encoders), Thomson/RCA (set-top boxes) and NDS (conditional access and encryption). In 1996, another high-power Direct Broadcast Satellite (DBS) competitor, Dish Network, was launched by Echostar utilizing the DVB digital satellite TV standard and technology from Harmonic (encoders), Nagra (conditional access and encrytion), and Echostar (set-top boxes).

However, the launch of standards-based digital cable, digital satellite, and digital HDTV services depended upon the successful resolution of the intellectual property rights (essential patents) related to the MPEG-2 video standard. Since there were numerous patents essential to the MPEG-2 standard owned by multiple companies, it became a significant stumbling block for the global media industry to utilize the MPEG-2 standard. Led by CableLabs, a group of the leading current MPEG-2 patent holders (General Instrument, Sony, Matsushita, Philips, and Thomson) was formed. After a series of contentious meetings and negotiations, the group finally agreed on a reasonable and efficient joint licensing structure. This milestone culminated in July 1997 with a celebration and press conference in Tokyo at The Okura Hotel, attended by technology companies from all over the world. Since many companies were already shipping MPEG-2 compatible digital satellite and cable TV products, and also DVD discs and players, it was a major relief to see the patent issue resolved.

Digital cable TV was first tested and launched in the US in 1996 by TCI in Hartford, Connecticut, using General Instrument's MPEG-2 based technology and products, leading to a TCI national rollout, followed by Comcast, Cox and many other cable operators throughout the US. By 1998, Scientific-Atlanta started shipping its MPEG-2 based digital cable headend and set-top boxes to Time Warner Cable and others. The cable operators installed GI's and Scientific-Atlanta's digital infrastructure equipment in their headends to receive the digital satellite TV signals and reprocess them for digital transmission to cable subscribers' homes equipped with digital set-top boxes. In the mid-2000s, telcos such as Verizon FiOS and AT&T U-verse also entered the market with digital TV service, both using technology from Motorola, which had acquired GI several years earlier.

As the turn of the century approached, the "chicken and egg" HDTV situation between lack of HD content and the small installed base of consumer HDTV sets began to make progress. The FCC had mandated that US TV stations in the top 30 markets, covering half of US television households, must start broadcasting digital signals by November 1999. There was no requirement, however, for the content to be in HDTV format, so long as it was in a digital SDTV format. CBS began some limited digital HD broadcasting of certain special events, such as the October 1998 spectacle of astronaut and US Senator John Glenn becoming the oldest person to fly in space aboard the space shuttle Discovery, with 8 CBS affiliates carrying the network broadcast in high definition. The following month, ABC delivered the movie 101 Dalmations in HD, and then on January 30, 2000 ABC broadcast Super Bowl XXXIV in HD.

In the satellite and cable HDTV markets, HBO launched HBO HD in March 1999, followed by Viacom's Showtime HD launch in 2001. Mark Cuban's HDNet went live via DirecTV in late 2001, delivering exclusive HD coverage of the US invasion of Afghanistan following the 9/11 Al Qaeda terrorist attack. Discovery HD Theater launched in June 2002. By March 2003, ESPN debuted its new ESPN HD channel with the Major League Baseball season opener, and a plan to deliver 100 professional baseball, basketball, hockey, and football games live in HD. Then, in July of 2003, Cablevision Systems, through its Rainbow content subsidiary, launched Voom, a high-power DBS satellite and service dedicated to HDTV. Chuck Dolan, who much earlier in his career was the founder of HBO and then Cablevision, believed there was an untapped market for a pure HDTV content service. By 2004 Voom was delivering 36 HDTV satellite channels including many unique channels programmed by Cablevision's Rainbow Media subsidiary. The Voom satellite and orbital position was sold, however, to its competitor, Dish Networks, ending the Voom standalone HDTV service. Regardless, many new HDTV content channels continued to be created and delivered and digital HDTV, with much higher video resolution than SDTV, was finally poised to be the future of home television entertainment. DirecTV, Dish Network, and various cable operators all deliver more than 100 HD channels to subscribers. In the 2020s, with 4k resolutions (and even some 8k), and subsequent international video coding standards such as MPEG-4 AVC (Advanced Video Coding), HEVC (High Efficiency Video Coding), VVC (Versatile Video Coding), and the AV1 codec, developed by an industry consortium, the digital television technology and market continue to evolve.

== See also ==
- The Business of Television
- Digital television transition in the United States
- High-definition television in the United States
- Pan-American television frequencies
- Coupon-eligible converter box (CECB)
