= IBiquity =

American private technology company

iBiquity Digital Corporation
- Type: Subsidiary
- Predecessors: USA Digital Radio; Lucent Digital Radio
- Headquarters: Columbia, Maryland, United States
- Parent: DTS
- Website: ibiquity.com

iBiquity Digital Corporation was a company formed by the merger of USA Digital Radio and Lucent Digital Radio. Based in Columbia, Maryland, with additional offices in Basking Ridge, New Jersey, Los Angeles, California, and Auburn Hills, Michigan, iBiquity was a privately held intellectual properties company with investors in the technology, broadcasting, manufacturing, media, and financial industries.

== About ==
IBOC can operate on both AM band and FM band broadcasts either in a digital-only mode or in a "hybrid" digital+analog mode. The stations can split the digital bandwidth to carry multiple audio program streams (called HD2 or HD3 multicast channels) as well as show on-screen text data such as song title and artist, traffic, and weather information. Nearly 2,000 stations in the US broadcast with this system. The technology is marketed under the trademark HD Radio. It is the only technology approved by the Federal Communications Commission for digital AM and FM broadcasting in the United States. Due in large part to its ability to deliver digital audio services while leveraging the existing analog spectrum (by broadcasting digital information on the sidebands), commercial implementation of the technology is gaining momentum in various countries on one side of the world, including Canada, Mexico, and the Philippines. Testing and showing the system are underway in China, Colombia, Germany, Indonesia, Jamaica, New Zealand, Poland, Switzerland, Thailand, and Ukraine, among other countries. According to iBiquity Digital, holder of the HD Radio trademark the "HD" in "HD Radio" does not stand for "High Definition" or "Hybrid Digital". It is simply part of their trademark, and does not have any meaning on its own. On September 2, 2015, iBiquity announced that DTS was purchasing them for US$172 million, bringing the HD Radio technology under the same banner as DTS' eponymous theater surround sound systems.
