= Sangean =

Taiwanese electronics company

Sangean Electronics, Inc.
- Native name: Chinese: 山進電子; pinyin: Shān Jìn diànzi
- Industry: Manufacturing
- Founded: 1974; 52 years ago
- Founder: Yang Ching-shan (楊清山)
- Headquarters: Zhonghe, New Taipei, Taiwan
- Area served: Global
- Products: Electronics, including radios
- Number of employees: 5000
- Website: tw.sangean.com/en/ (Taiwan) us.sangean.com/en/ (USA) eu.sangean.com/uk/ (Europe)

Sangean
- Traditional Chinese: 山進電子
- Simplified Chinese: 山进电子
Transcriptions
Standard Mandarin
- Hanyu Pinyin: Shān Jìn diànzǐ
- Bopomofo: ㄕㄢ ㄐㄧㄣˋ ㄉㄧㄢˋ ㄗˇ
- Gwoyeu Romatzyh: Shan Jinn dianntzyy
- Wade–Giles: Shan^{1} Chin^{4} tien^{4}-tzu^{3}

Sangean Electronics, Inc. (Chinese: 山進電子; pinyin: Shān Jìn diànzi) is a Taiwanese electronics company headquartered in Zhonghe District, New Taipei, Taiwan, with a factory located in Dongguan, China. The organisation is globally active with business units in Venlo, Netherlands, for Europe and Santa Fe Springs, California, for the Americas. The business units are directly in contact with distributors in relevant areas. It is noted for its shortwave radio receivers and digital radio (HD and DAB) receivers.

== Products ==
Sangean produces DAB / DAB plus (DAB+) radios, shortwave radio receivers, HD Radio tuner radios (with international tuning support), weather radios, internet radios, work site radios, shower radios, portable radios and handheld radios.

The brand is distinctive for its designed products. Several products have won awards, which include Golden Pin Design Awards and the Taiwan Symbol of Excellence.

=== Products ===
Apart from products sold under its own brand names, which include Lextronix, Sangean also produces on behalf of other companies: Many of the radios marketed by Siemens, Panasonic, Braun, Grundig, C.Crane, and Roberts have been and are being developed and produced by Sangean.

The UNDOK app

Most of the internet radios Sangean produces are compatible with the UNDOK app. The app can be used to connect a mobile device to the radio and select an input (DAB, FM, Bluetooth) or radio station.

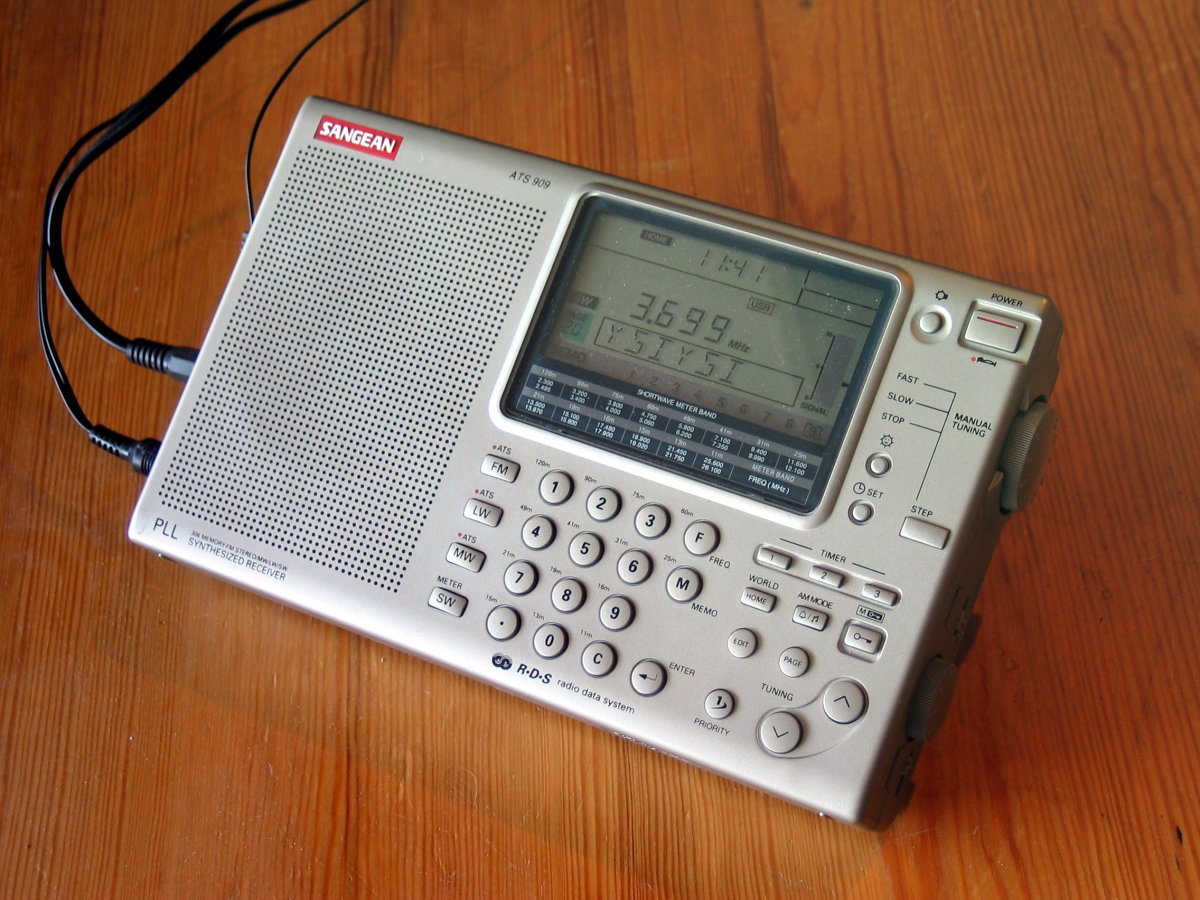
Sangean ATS 909

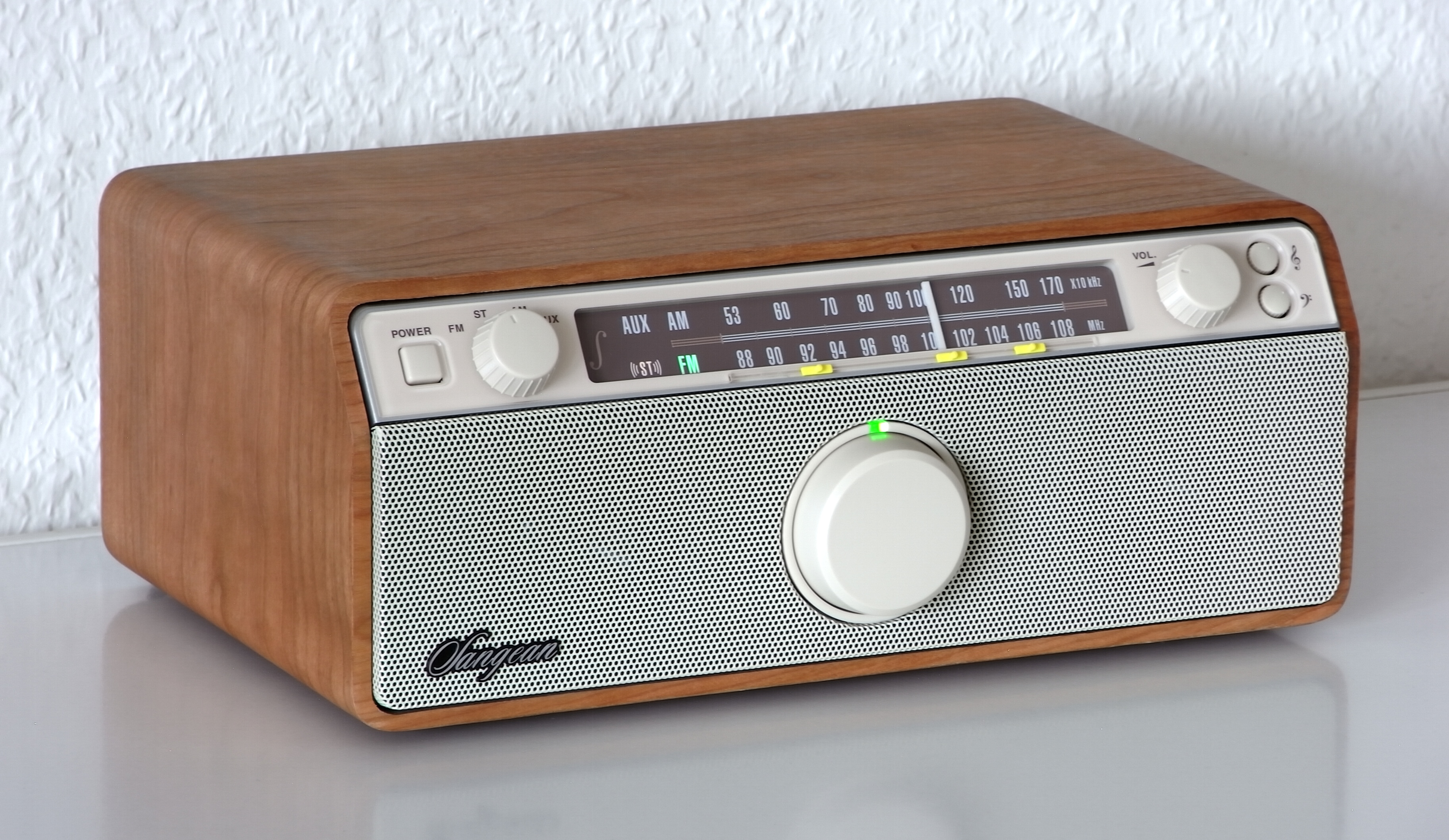
Sangean WR-12

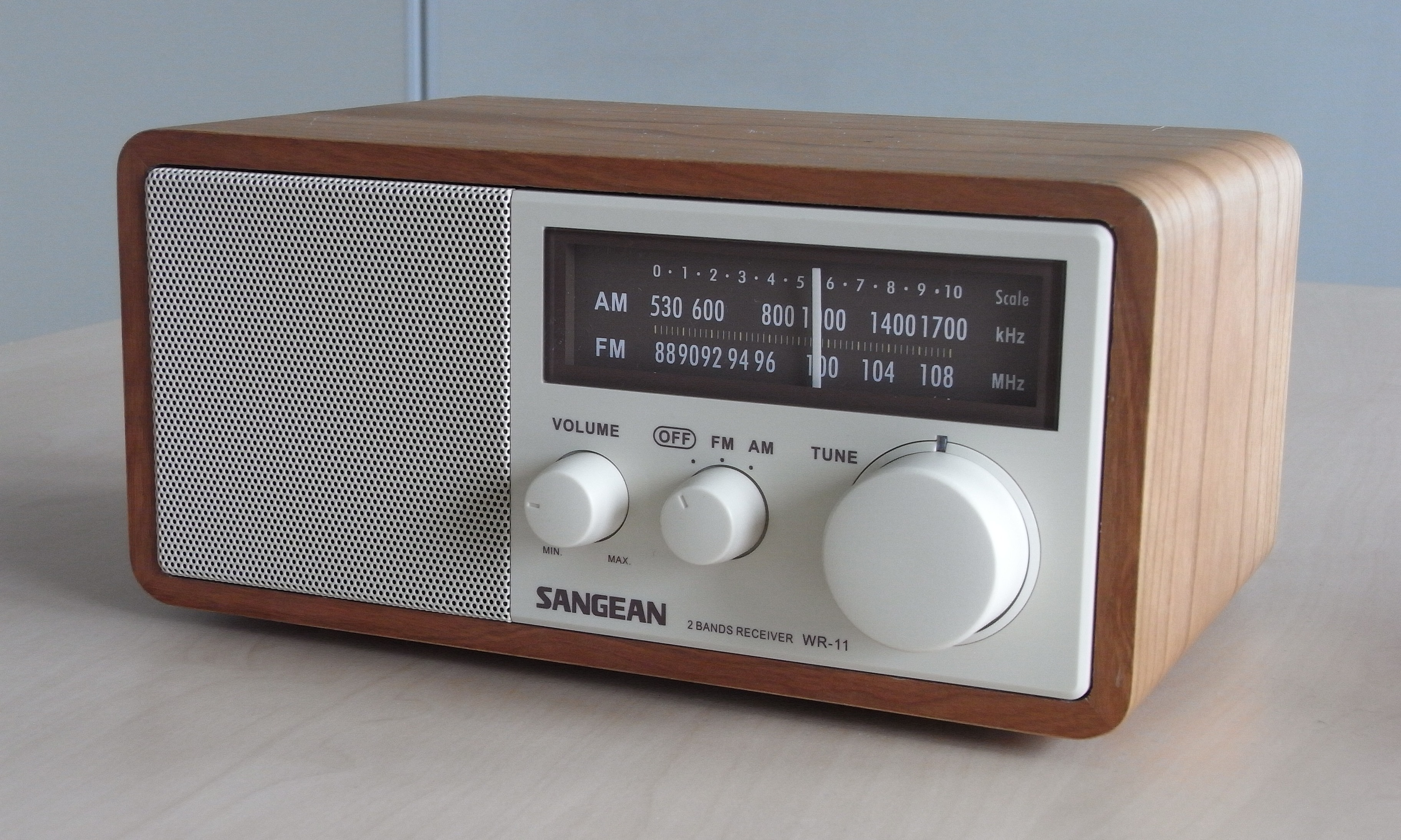
Sangean WR-11

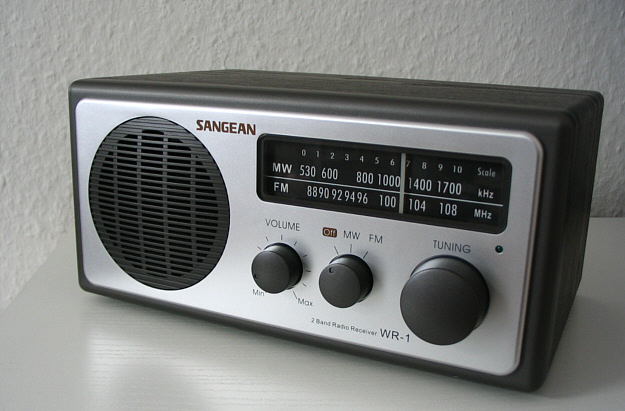
Sangean WR-1

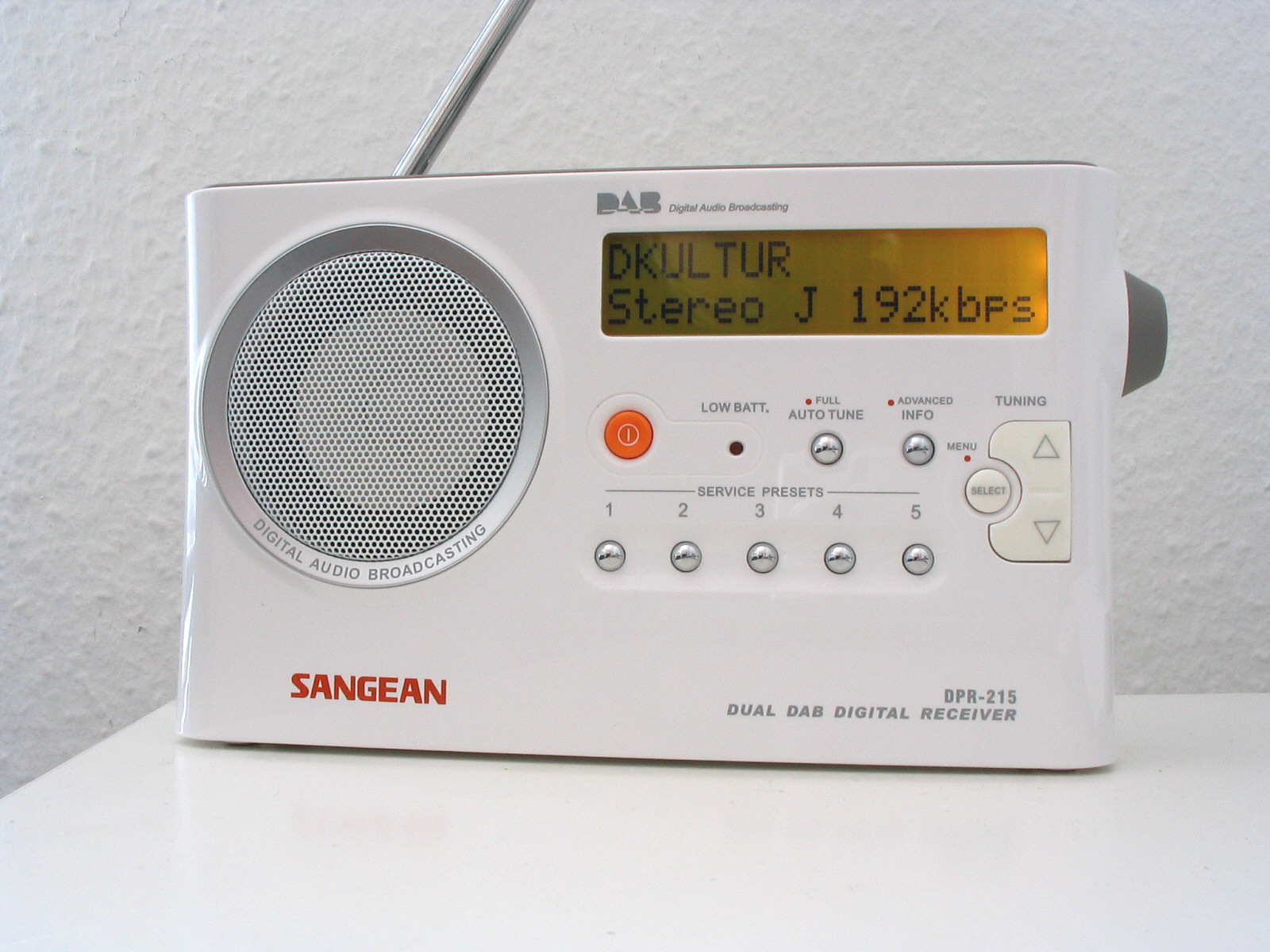
Sangean DPR-215

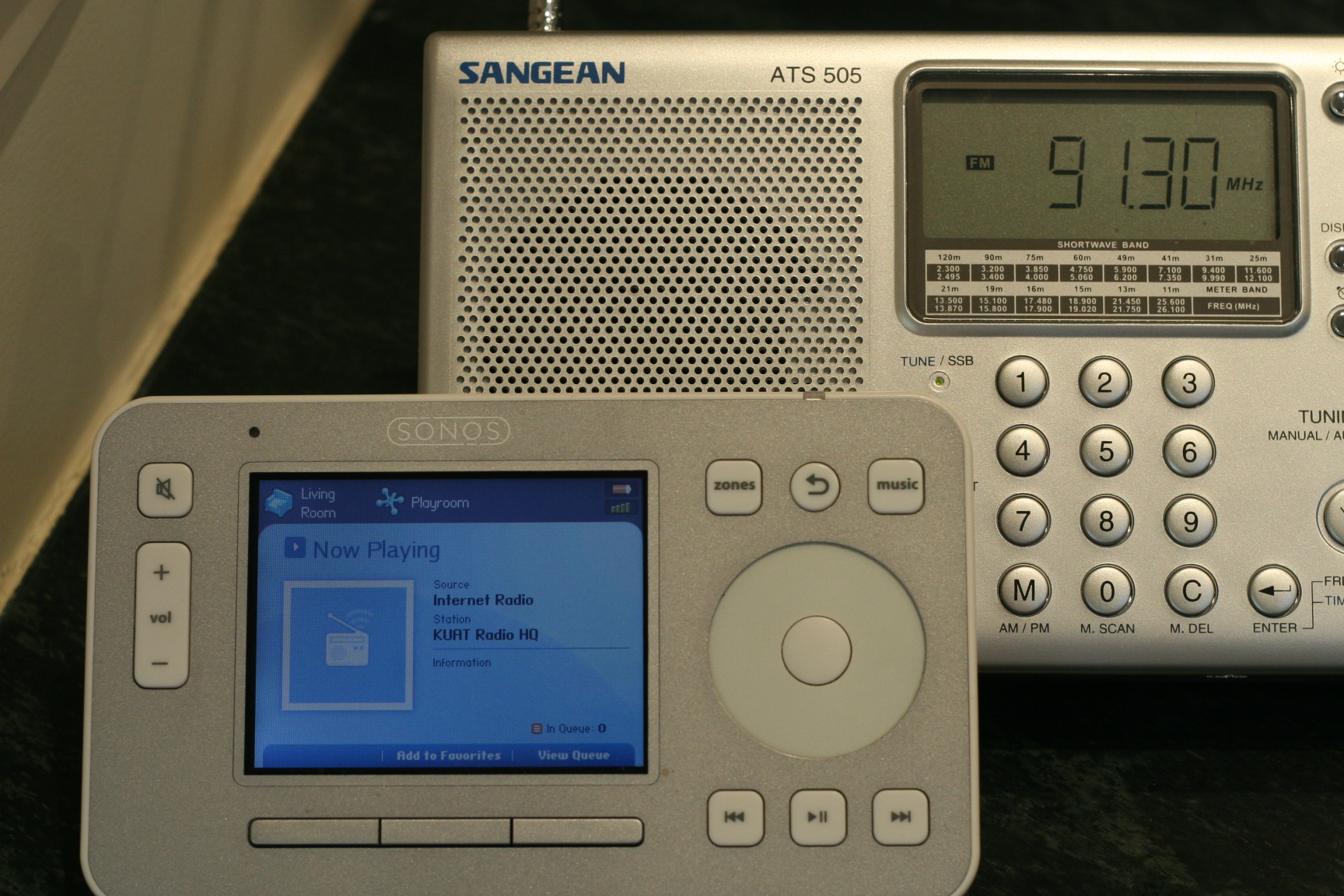
Sangean ATS 505 (top right)

== See also ==
- List of electronics companies
- List of companies of Taiwan
