= Ivi, Inc. =

American software application corporation

ivi, Inc.
- Type: Private company
- Industry: Electronic commerce
- Founded: 2007
- Founder: Todd Weaver
- Headquarters: Seattle, Washington, U.S.
- Area served: United States, World
- Key people: Todd Weaver, Founder and CEO
- Products: ivi TV
- Services: VC-1 video download
- Website: www.ivi.tv

Ivi Inc. also called Ivi, is a Seattle-based American corporation which offers a software application providing live video streaming over the Internet for a flat rate. Ivi (pronounced "ivy") is the first online cable company. The Ivi TV player is a downloadable software application that runs on Windows, Macintosh, or Linux computers that offers live television over the Internet.

== Legal ==
Ivi has been in a large lawsuit (WPIX, Inc. v. ivi, Inc.) filed on September 28, 2010 and decided on August 27, 2012 with several major US TV networks. This case has been deemed "The Case That Could Finally Put Live TV on the Internet" by Forbes, since the outcome of the case will determine if shows streamed over the Internet will be able to compete with cable and satellite television. A group of four public interest groups; the Electronic Frontier Foundation, Media Access Project, Open Technology Initiative, and Public Knowledge filed an amicus curiae brief in support of Ivi stating "The law does not favor larger or better-funded entities over new or smaller ones, nor is it a bludgeon to be used by large, entrenched interests to eliminate nascent competitors".

On February 22, 2011 District Judge Naomi Buchwald granted an injunction, shutting down most of the broadcast stations carried by Ivi. Ivi and its CEO argued that the company fitted the definition of a "cable system" under section 111(f) of U.S. Copyright Law. The plaintiffs, US TV Networks, argued that Ivi doesn't fit this description. The relevant part of copyright law reads "A cable system is a facility that 'makes secondary transmissions of such signals or programs by wires, cables, microwave, or other communications channels to subscribing members of the public.'" Ivi immediately filed an appeal to the Second Circuit Court of Appeals, but the court affirmed the district court's decision.

== See also ==
- WPIX, Inc. v. ivi, Inc.
