= ICraveTV =

Canadian TV website

iCraveTV was a Canadian website, which operated from 1999 to 2000. The site offered streaming Internet broadcasts of the conventional television stations, both Canadian and American, that were available as over-the-air signals in Toronto.

The site, launched by William Craig through his TVRadioNow Corporation in December 1999, was intensely controversial during its short lifespan, raising significant questions around the interpretation of copyright law. Craig viewed the service as essentially equivalent to a cable television distributor, while many of the television stations whose signals were being distributed, and the producers of programming airing on those stations, viewed the site's actions as analogous to the RIAA's copyright infringement case against Napster.

Although it was in operation for just three months before shutting down, the site had the effect of pressuring both Canadian and American television networks to start streaming their own programming directly on the web, and thus played a disproportionately prominent role in the development of the web as it exists in the 21st century.

== History ==
Two weeks after the site's launch, it announced plans to also add television signals from the Vancouver and Seattle markets to its service.

Although officially the site was geoblocked so that only Canadian viewers could use it, technology to enforce geoblocking at the server level did not yet exist; rather, the only geoblocking method available at the time was to ask site users to enter their telephone area code. No technological method existed at the time to prevent viewers in the United States from accessing the site by entering a Canadian area code, however, so this left the site vulnerable to American law despite being based in Canada. As cable television in the United States was primarily governed under the principle of retransmission consent, under which cable operators must negotiate and pay for carriage of broadcast television services, the site's methods were more clearly in violation of American law even while being at least semi-legal under Canadian law.

In February 2000, a U.S. court issued a preliminary injunction against iCraveTV in Twentieth Century Fox Film Corp v. iCraveTV, enjoining it from streaming its signals into the United States. However, the Canadian courts did not have the opportunity to consider the matter because, in late February, the company succumbed to legal pressure and agreed to discontinue its streaming operations in return for the withdrawal of all actions against it. The company also agreed to withdraw its December 1999 request to the Canadian Copyright Board for an interim Internet retransmission tariff for the years 1999 and 2000, with a final tariff to be determined in due course.

In June 2000, Craig announced plans to relaunch iCraveTV, this time rebroadcasting the programming of Canadian specialty channels such as YTV and MuchMusic. However, the relaunch never materialized in this form; instead, it was relaunched in 2002 as a platform for Herbert L. Becker's experimental EnterVision video format. Craig went on to acquire PrideVision, Canada's LGBT-focused television channel, in 2003.

== Impact ==
During the controversy, television networks began investing in streaming technology, launching their own proprietary streaming options beginning in 2000.

In a piece for the National Post, journalist and academic Matthew Fraser essentially agreed with William Craig's position, noting that even cable television itself had started out as "pirate" retransmission of broadcast signals before evolving into an essential part of the television broadcasting ecosystem as the legal issues were debated and ironed out.

== See also ==
- Aereo
- LocalBTV
- Locast
