= Web-to-TV =

A Web-to-TV installation provides a way to show streaming television or other over-the-top content from the Internet, to a television set. Various technologies to do this include Home theater PCs (desktop computers running more user-friendly software for TV viewing), digital media receivers (also known as "media extenders", replaying content from a local area network), and Smart TVs (television sets and set-top boxes with Internet capabilities).

== Media extenders ==
Several companies provide media extenders including Netgear and Dlink. Advanced game consoles - Xbox 360 from Microsoft, PS3 from Sony, and the Nintendo Wii - can be configured to stream or view content delivered from a PC on the user's home network.

== LocalCasting ==
A new entry from HDMI to Coax connects to the VGA output of a home PC/server and LocalCasts (transmits) it throughout the users house over the existing coax wiring as a normal HD Dolby 5.1 channel that is directly tunable by all connected HDTV's. A unique benefit of this approach is that no additional boxes are required at each TV because only single LocalCast device is required to insert a private channel on the homes coax distribution system. In order to do this the monitor output of the PC is digitized, MPEG2 compressed, and QAM encoded all at HD resolution and in real-time. The LocalCasting PC is controlled with an RF remote or RF keyboard that includes a pointing device to provide normal interactivity with any PC application within a range suitable for the normal home. Another important benefit of this over-the-top approach is that it provides the broadest access to internet content because it supports any content or application that can be viewed on a PC.

== Video on demand ==
HD Encodulators are a new class of device in Digital Video Broadcast (DVB). Encodulators are devices that bundle a digital encoder and an RF agile modulator into one package. Encodulators accept uncompressed video as either HD or SD and encode the source to an MPEG transport stream. This transport stream can be based on either MPEG-2 or MPEG-4(H.264) broadcasting codecs. Once the video is encoded it is passed on to the modulator component of the device. The agile modulator overlays the MPEG transport stream onto a high frequency carrier wave for DTV broadcast. In the US this is typically in the 50 - 900 MHz range for terrestrial television, and 900 - 2600 MHz for satellite distribution. Standards used for terrestrial broadcast are 8-level Vestigial Sideband Modulation (8VSB) for over the air, and Quadrature Amplitude Modulation (QAM) for cable TV. A typical example of an encodulator are the units from Thor Broadcast. These units include both a high definition encoder and a frequency agile modulator for all major DVB modulation types. Many more manufacturers are moving to this sort of consolidated hardware platform. In the last year other manufacturers such as Comlan have released similar units. In the future we will see more and more broadcasting companies moving to consolidated equipment, both to save on rackspace and on cost.

== Content subscription ==
KylinTV provides a "box" that serves a number of Chinese language web channels. The service is sold on a monthly subscription basis. Time Warner cable announced plans to offer a web to TV solution.

== Internet-ready TV ==
Sony Bravia Internet Link provides Web to TV without a PC.

Sony has also announced plans to integrate this functionality into future TVs. Several major TV suppliers have made similar claims. The advent of high performance, low cost processors from ARM and Intel will ultimately bring the Web to (every) TV.

== See also ==
- Cord-cutting
- Over-the-top media service
