= C. Crane Company =

C. Crane
- Company type: Private
- Industry: Electronics
- Founded: 1976
- Founder: Bob Crane
- Headquarters: Fortuna, California, United States
- Number of employees: 50 (2009)
- Website: http://www.ccrane.com

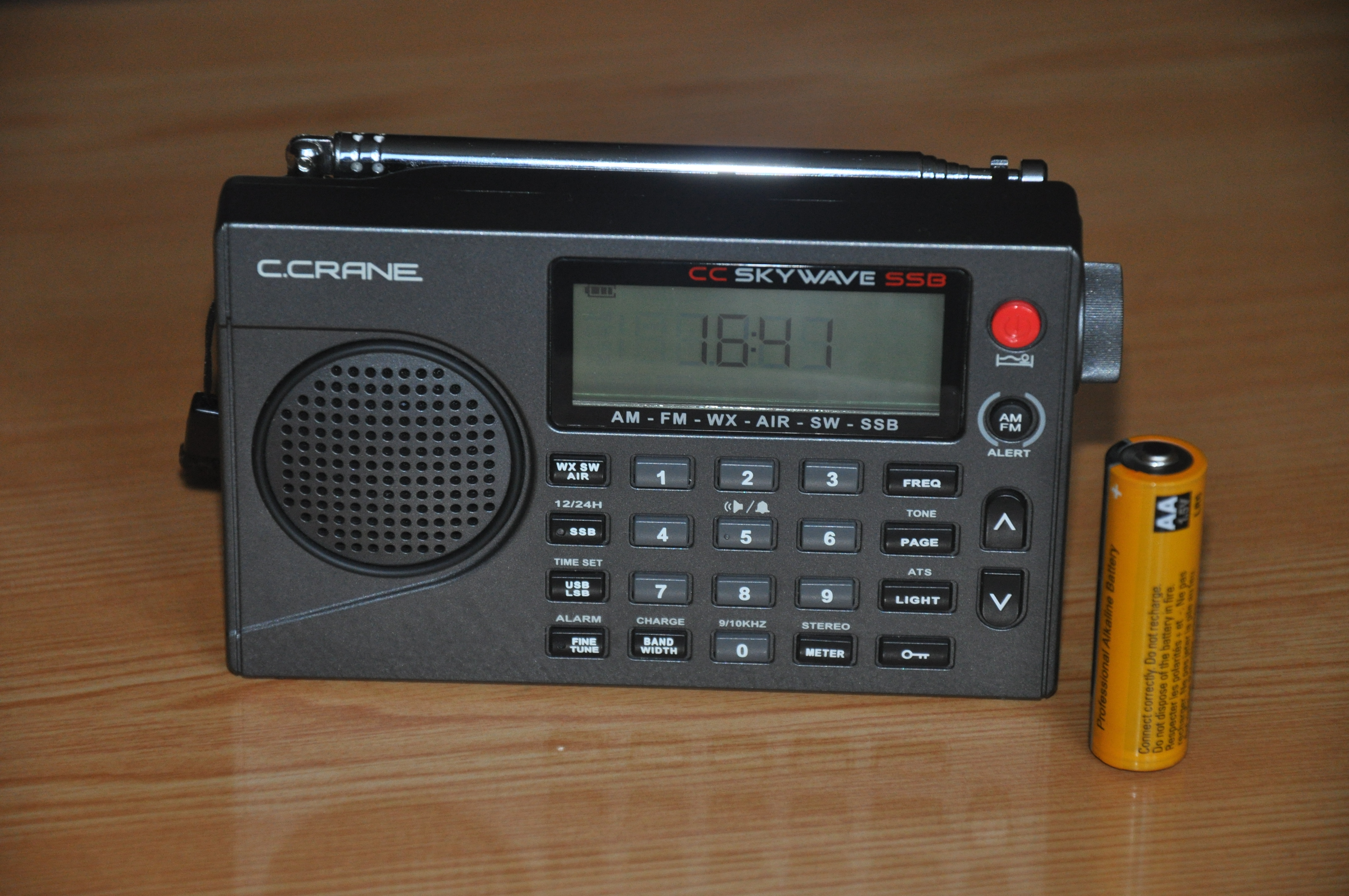
C. Crane Skywave SSB Battery Operated Portable Travel Radio AM, FM, Shortwave, NOAA Weather Alert, Scannable VHF Aviation Band and Single Side Bands

C. Crane is an American electronics retailer based in Fortuna, California. The company mainly deals in specialty radio equipment.

== History ==
C. Crane was founded in 1976 in San Francisco, California, by Bob Crane, a former cabinetmaker, and his wife Susan Crane. The "C" is Crane's middle initial, as well as his wife's and children's. The company was initially a furniture design and manufacturing company and only switched to being an electronics distributor in 1983, upon the Cranes' relocation to Fortuna. C. Crane's first electronics product was the "Select-A-Tenna", an antenna manufactured by Intensitronics Corp. of Hales Corners, Wisconsin, for long-distance reception of AM radio broadcasts. The company advertised on late-night radio shows, which served to increase business from AM listeners looking for a better antenna. Later in the 1980s, C. Crane began to distribute radios, such as the GE Superadio, to go along with their antennas. In the 1990s, Bob Crane decided to move the company toward designing its own products, rather than just retailing what was already out there. Following the 1992 Cape Mendocino earthquakes, the company expanded their catalog to include emergency radios and other disaster equipment, such as flashlights. Eventually, C. Crane began to produce its own radios in collaboration with Sangean. At the present radio division of C. Crane specializes in weak signal reception and developed many products to improve the reception of weak radio and internet signals. C. Crane also focuses on high quality audio.

== GeoBulb ==
In 1998, C. Crane introduced the "CCTrek" flashlight. This flashlight used two white LEDs as opposed to an incandescent bulb. Realizing the amount of energy LEDs save over regular light bulbs, the company developed and released an LED light bulb in 2001. This was followed in 2006 by the GeoBulb project. The GeoBulb, based solely on LEDs, was released on March 27, 2009. The company claims the bulb has a lifespan of 10 years and draws only 7.5 W of power, and predicted widespread adoption of the bulb would cut energy usage worldwide by one-tenth. Initially, the bulb is targeted at owners of public buildings that need to be lit continuously, in order to save costs associated with having to purchase and replace incandescent bulbs. Reviews of the bulb reflected positively on its energy usage and lifespan but criticized the lights' unnatural color and their high cost when compared to standard incandescent and compact fluorescent bulbs. The GeoBulb has since been discontinued.
