= D/U ratio =

Broadcast television signal-to-noise ratio

In the design of radio broadcast systems, especially television systems, the desired-to-undesired channel ratio (D/U ratio) is a measure of the strength of the broadcast signal for a particular channel compared with the strength of undesired broadcast signals in the same channel (e.g. from other nearby transmitting stations).

== See also ==
- Signal-to-noise ratio
