= The Business of Television =

Book by Ken Basin

- Author: Ken Basin
- Genre: Business, Arts, Humanities, Law
- Publisher: Routledge
- Publication date: July 16, 2018
- Pages: 320
- ISBN: 0815368666

The Business of Television is a 2018 book by television executive, Harvard lecturer, and lawyer Ken Basin detailing the business, financial, and legal structure of the American television business and how the economics of the industry is changing. A second edition was published September 19, 2024 and expands on the first edition's 320 pages to 644 pages with information on the evolving streaming television business.

== Overview ==
The chapters of the 1st edition book are:

1. A Beginner's Guide to the Television Industry
2. The Life Cycle of a Television Series
3. The Intellectual Property Context of Television (Or, When Do You Need to Acquire Underlying Rights?)
4. Underlying Rights Agreements
5. Talent Agreements
6. Backend
7. Exclusive Studio-Talent Relationships
8. Network and Streaming Licenses and Studio Co-Production Agreements
9. Sample Economic Model
10. Unscripted Television

The 2nd edition of the book expands on the 1st edition with information about the evolving streaming business, reflects the impacts of the 2020 COVID-19 pandemic and 2023 WGA and SAG-AFTRA strikes. The chapters of the 2nd edition book are:

1. A Beginner's Guide to the Television Industry
2. Streaming: The End, Present, and Future of Television
3. How Television Is Developed, Produced, and Distributed (and How Streaming Broke Television Distribution)
4. The Intellectual Property Context of Television (Or, When Do You Need to Acquire Underlying Rights?)
5. Underlying Rights Deals
6. Writing and Non-Writing Producing Deals
7. Directing and Production Management Deals
8. Acting and Casting Deals
9. Backend
10. Overall and First Look Deals
11. Network and Streaming License and Studio Co-Production Deals
12. Unscripted Television
13. On Negotiation

== Publication history ==
- Basin, Ken (2018). The Business of Television. New York: Routledge. doi:10.4324/9781351254182. ISBN 978-1-351-25418-2.
- Basin, Ken (2024). The Business of Television: Updated and Expanded Second Edition (2nd ed.). New York: Routledge. ISBN 978-1-040-10527-6.
