= William Craig (broadcaster) =

Canadian broadcaster

William (Bill) Craig is a Canadian broadcaster.

Craig began his career as a researcher for the Canadian Broadcasting Corporation's This Hour Has Seven Days. He subsequently joined the programming departments at the CBC, TVOntario and Rogers Cable. He was also a policy analyst for the Canadian Radio-television and Telecommunications Commission in the 1970s.

In the 1990s, Craig launched four regional sports networks in the United States. In 1999, he launched iCraveTV, a controversial website which offered streaming broadcasts of television stations. He shut down the website the following year after a copyright infringement lawsuit from the American broadcasters whose signals were available on the service.

He acquired PrideVision, Canada's LGBT television network, in 2004, and announced plans to improve the channel's cable distribution by separating its adult entertainment and general interest programming onto two distinct channels.

In 2005, the CRTC approved Craig's licence for an adult entertainment channel, and relaunched PrideVision as OUTtv and carried the PrideVision name to the adult channel named HARD on PrideVision, later renamed HARDtv. In 2006, Craig sold his interest in OUTtv and HARDtv to Shavick Entertainment and Pink Triangle Press.

In 2011, Craig became the CEO of Citywest, a municipally owned communications company in Northwest BC.
