= Service contour =

Predicted broadcast coverage area in the US

In US broadcasting, service contour (or protected contour) refers to the area in which the Federal Communications Commission (FCC) predicts coverage.

The FCC calculates FM and TV contours based on effective radiated power (ERP) in a given direction, the radial height above average terrain (HAAT) in a given direction, the FCC's propagation curves, and the station's class. AM contours are based on the standard ground wave field strength pattern, the frequency, and the ground conductivity in the area. While the FCC makes FM and TV service contour data readily available, the AM, while unavailable as a separate data file, can be obtained through an AM Query in the resulting 'maps' section of each record (when using the 'detailed output' output option).
