= Streaming television =

Distribution of television content via the public internet

Streaming television is the digital distribution of television media content, such as series and films, over Internet-based streaming media platforms. In contrast to over-the-air, cable, and satellite transmissions, or IPTV service, streaming television is provided as over-the-top media (OTT). Television content includes productions made by or for OTT services, and acquired by them with licensing agreements. The length of a streaming television series episode can be anywhere from 30 to 60 minutes or longer. (Note: Television series with episode runtimes of 30+ minutes are considered 'long-form series'.) Similar to the running time of theatrical films, the average length of a film licensed or produced by a streaming platform is 90 to 120 minutes.

Streaming television is available via paid subscription or as free ad-supported service. By 2023, streaming television represented 38% of global TV viewing with 1.8 billion subscriptions to streaming platforms. In 2024, streaming television became "the dominant form of TV viewing" in the United States. (Note: "What started as [a] niche corner in the media landscape in the early 2000s has grown to the dominant form of TV viewing in the U.S.") It surpassed cable and network television viewing in 2025. Of the top streaming platforms, Netflix had over 325 million subscribers as of December 2025, making it the most popular global streaming television service.

== History ==
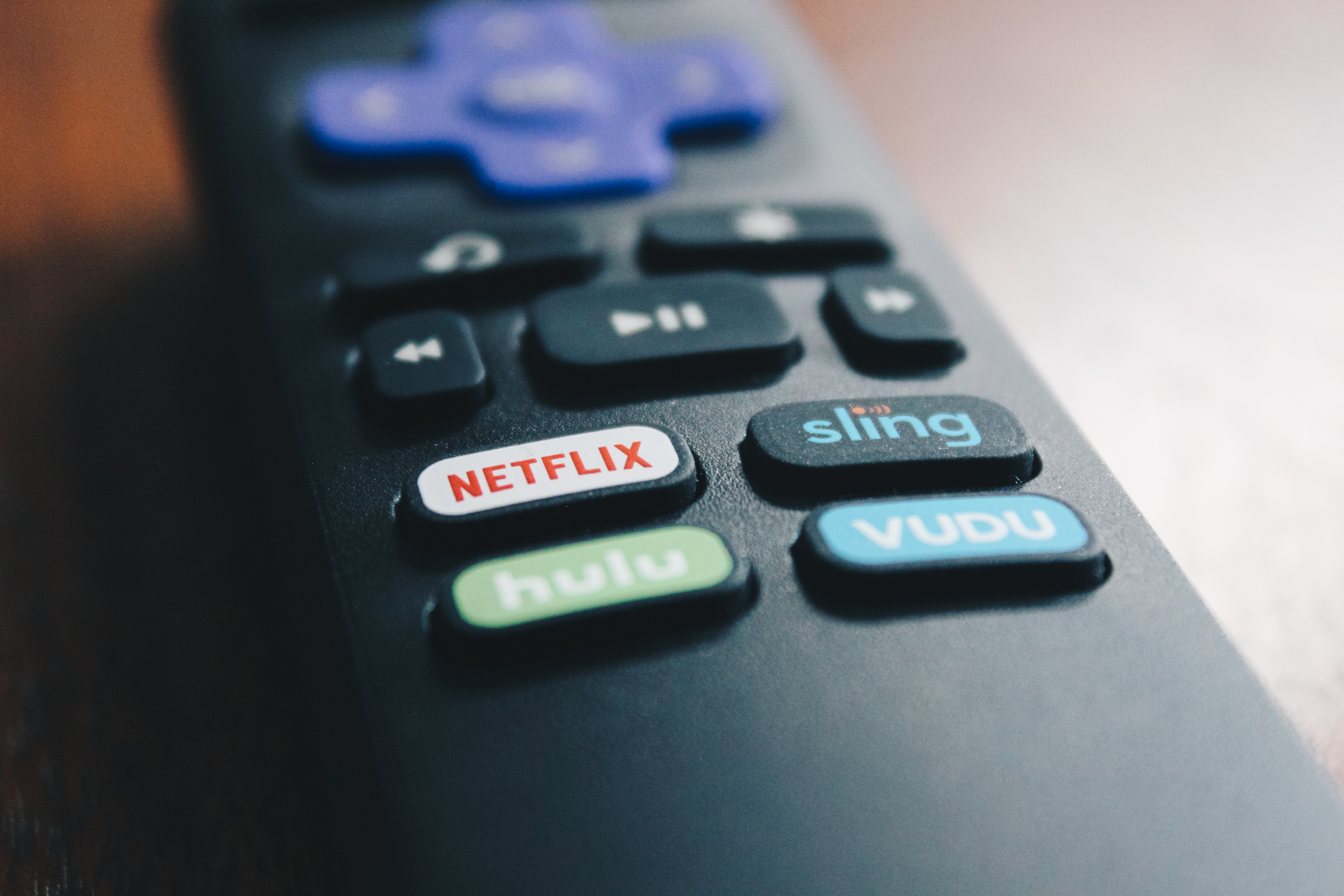
A digital media player remote control with dedicated buttons for streaming television services

=== 1990s ===
Up until the 1990s, it was not thought possible that a television show could be squeezed into the limited telecommunication bandwidth of a copper telephone cable to provide a streaming service of acceptable quality, as the required bandwidth of a digital television signal was (in the mid-1990s perceived to be) around 200 Mbit/s, which was 2,000 times greater than the bandwidth of a speech signal over a copper telephone wire.

Streaming services started as a result of two major technological developments: MPEG (motion-compensated DCT) video compression and asymmetric digital subscriber line (ADSL) data communication. By the year 2000, a television broadcast could be compressed to 2 Mbit/s, but most consumers still had little opportunity to obtain greater than 1 Mbit/s connection speeds.

The first worldwide live-streaming event was a radio live broadcast of a baseball game between the Seattle Mariners and the New York Yankees streamed by ESPN SportsZone on September 5, 1995.

=== 2000s ===
The mid-2000s were the beginning of television programs becoming available via the Internet. In November 2003, Angelos Diamantoulakis launched the streaming television service TVonline, making it the world's first television station to produce and broadcast content exclusively over the internet via web page. The online video platform site YouTube was launched in early 2005, allowing users to share illegally posted television programs. YouTube co-founder Jawed Karim said the inspiration for YouTube first came from Janet Jackson's role in the 2004 Super Bowl incident, when her breast was exposed during her performance, and later from the 2004 Indian Ocean tsunami. Karim could not easily find video clips of either event online, which led to the idea of a video sharing site. Apple's iTunes service also began offering select television programs and series in 2005, available for download after direct payment.

During the mid-2000s, the streaming media was based on UDP, whereas the basis of the majority of the Internet was HTTP and content delivery networks (CDNs). In 2007, HTTP-based adaptive streaming was introduced by Move Networks. This new technology would be a significant change for the industry. One year later the introduction of HTTP-based adaptive streaming, many companies such as Microsoft and Netflix developed their streaming technology. In 2009, Apple launched HTTP Live Streaming (HLS).

Television networks and other independent services began creating sites where shows and programs could be streamed online. Amazon Prime Video began in the United States as Amazon Unbox in 2006 (but did not launch worldwide until 2016). Netflix, a website originally created for DVD rentals and sales, began providing streaming content in 2007. The first-generation Apple TV was released in 2007. In 2008 Hulu, owned by NBC and Fox, was launched, followed by tv.com in 2009, owned by CBS.

Digital media players also began to become available to the public during this time. In 2008, the first generation Roku streaming device was announced. These digital media players have continued to be updated and new generations released.

In 2008, the International Academy of Web Television, headquartered in Los Angeles, formed in order to organize and support television actors, authors, executives, and producers in streaming television and web series. The organization also administers the selection of winners for the Streamy Awards. In 2009, the Los Angeles Web Series Festival was founded. Several other festivals and award shows have been dedicated solely to web content, including the Indie Series Awards and the Vancouver Web Series Festival.

=== 2010s ===
in 2010, Adobe launched HTTP Dynamic Streaming (HDS). In addition, HTTP-based adaptive streaming was chosen for important streaming events such as the Roland Garros and Wimbledon tournaments, the Vancouver and London Olympic Games, and premium on-demand services (such as Netflix, Amazon Instant Video and Prime Instant Video, etc.).

The increase in streaming services required a new standardization, therefore in 2012, with the contributions of Apple, Netflix, Microsoft, and other companies, Dynamic Adaptive Streaming, known as MPEG-DASH, was published as the new HTTP-based adaptive streaming standard.

Smart TVs took over the television market after 2010 and continue to partner with new providers to bring streaming video to even more users. As of 2015, smart TVs are the only type of middle to high-end television being produced. Amazon's version of a digital media player, Amazon Fire TV, was not offered to the public until 2014.

Access to television programming has evolved from computer and television access to include mobile devices such as smartphones and tablet computers. Corresponding apps for mobile devices started to become available via app stores in 2008, but they grew in popularity in the 2010s with the rapid deployment of LTE cellular networks. These apps enable users to stream television content on mobile devices that support them.

In 2013, in response to the shifting of the soap opera All My Children from broadcast to streaming television, a new category for "Fantastic web-only series" in the Daytime Emmy Awards was created. That year, Netflix made history with the first Primetime Emmy Award nominations for a streaming television series at the 65th Primetime Emmy Awards, for Arrested Development, Hemlock Grove, and House of Cards. Hulu earned the first Emmy win for Outstanding Drama Series, for The Handmaid's Tale at the 69th Primetime Emmy Awards in 2017.

Traditional cable and satellite television providers began to offer streaming services. In 2012, British broadcaster Sky launched Now streaming service in the United Kingdom. Sling TV was unveiled by Dish Network in January 2015. Cable company Comcast announced an HBO plus broadcast TV package at a price discounted from basic broadband plus basic cable in July 2015. DirecTV launched their streaming service, DirecTV Stream, in 2016. In 2017, YouTube launched YouTube TV, a streaming service that allows users to watch live television programs from popular cable or network channels, and record shows to stream anywhere, anytime.

By the end 2015, Netflix had almost 75 million world-wide subscribers. In 2017, 28% of US adults cited streaming services as their main means for watching television, and 61% of those ages 18 to 29 cited it as their main method.

=== 2020s ===
In 2020, the COVID-19 pandemic had a strong impact in the television streaming business with the lifestyle changes such as staying at home and lockdowns.

By 2024, Netflix had become the world's largest streaming television platform with 260.28 million global subscribers. By the end of 2025, its active subscribers total had grown to over 325 million.

As of May 2025, Nielsen reported that streaming represented 44.8% of all television viewing, compared to 44.2% for broadcast and cable combined.

== Technology ==
The Hybrid Broadcast Broadband TV (HbbTV) consortium of industry companies (such as SES, Humax, Philips, and ANT Software) is currently promoting and establishing an open European standard for hybrid set-top boxes for the reception of broadcast and broadband digital television and multimedia applications with a single-user interface.

BBC iPlayer originally incorporated peer-to-peer streaming, moved towards centralized distribution for their video streaming services. BBC executive Anthony Rose cited network performance as an important factor in the decision, as well as consumers being unhappy with their own network bandwidth being used for transmitting content to other viewers. Samsung TV has also announced their plans to provide streaming options including 3D Video on Demand through their Explore 3D service.

=== Access control ===
Some streaming services incorporate digital rights management. The W3C made the controversial decision to adopt Encrypted Media Extensions due in large part to motivations to provide copy protection for streaming content. Sky Go has software that is provided by Microsoft to prevent content being copied.

Additionally, BBC iPlayer makes use of a parental control system giving users the option to "lock" content, requiring a password to access it. The goal of these systems is to enable parents to keep children from viewing sexually themed, violent, or otherwise age-inappropriate material. Flagging systems can be used to warn a user that content may be certified or that it is intended for viewing post-watershed. Honour systems are also used where users are asked for their dates of birth or age to verify if they are able to view certain content.

== Streaming quality ==
Streaming quality is the quality of image and audio transmission from the servers of the distributor to the user's screen. Also, Streaming resolution helps to measure the size of the streaming quality of video pixels. High-definition video (720p+) and later standards require higher bandwidth and faster connection speeds than previous standards, because they carry higher spatial resolution image content. In addition, transmission packet loss and latency caused by network impairments and insufficient bandwidth degrade replay quality. Decoding errors may manifest themselves with video breakup and macro blocks. The generally accepted download rate for streaming high-definition (1080p) video encoded in AVC is 6000 kbit/s, whereas UHD requires upwards of 16,000 kbit/s.

For users who do not have the bandwidth to stream HD/4K video or even SD video, most streaming platforms make use of an adaptive bitrate stream so that if the user's bandwidth suddenly drops, the platform will lower its streaming bitrate to compensate. Most modern television streaming platforms offer a wide range of both manual and automatic bitrate settings which are based on initial connection tests during the first few seconds of a video loading, and can be changed on the fly. This is valid for both Live and Catch-up content. Additionally, platforms can also offer content in standards such as HDR or Dolby Vision or at higher framerates which can require additional costs or subscription tiers to access.

== Usage ==
Internet television is common in most US households as of the mid-2010s. In a 2013 study by eMarketer, about one in four new televisions being sold is a smart TV. Within the same decade, rapid deployment of LTE cellular network and general availability of smartphones have increased popularity of the streaming services, and the corresponding apps on mobile devices. On August 18, 2022, Nielsen reported that for the first time, streaming viewership has surpassed cable.

Considering the popularity of smart TVs, smartphones, and devices such as the Roku and Chromecast, much of the US public can watch television via the Internet. Internet-only channels are now established enough to feature some Emmy-nominated shows, such as Netflix's House of Cards. Many networks also distribute their shows the next day to streaming providers such as Hulu Some networks may use a proprietary system, such as the BBC utilizes their BBC iPlayer format. This has resulted in bandwidth demands increasing to the point of causing issues for some networks. It was reported in February 2014 that Verizon Fios is having issues coping with the demand placed on their network infrastructure. Until long-term bandwidth issues are worked out and regulation such at net neutrality Internet Televisions push to HDTV may start to hinder growth.

Aereo was launched in March 2012 in New York City (and subsequently stopped from broadcasting in June 2014). It streamed network TV only to New York customers over the Internet. Broadcasters filed lawsuits against Aereo, because Aereo captured broadcast signals and streamed the content to Aereo's customers without paying broadcasters. In mid-July 2012, a federal judge sided with the Aereo start-up. Aereo planned to expand to every major metropolitan area by the end of 2013. The Supreme Court ruled against Aereo June 24, 2014.

Some have noted that as opposed to broadcast television, with demographics of mostly "unspokenly straight" white viewers, cable, and with streaming services, dollars from subscription can "level the playing field," giving viewers from marginalized communities, and representation of their communities, "equal power."

The viewing of television content on streaming platforms represented 19% of all television consumption in the United States in 2019, and by the end of 2023 it had become the nation's "dominant form of TV viewing".

With 1.8 billion subscriptions to streaming platforms, streaming television represented 38% of global TV viewing in 2023. However, some streaming platforms have reportedly begun to experience subscriber losses, likely due to price increases. Reportedly, 53% of surveyed millennials choose to cancel subscriptions following increases in subscription costs.

== Market competitors ==
Many providers of Internet television services exist—including conventional television stations that have taken advantage of the Internet as a way to continue showing television shows after they have been broadcast, often advertised as "on-demand" and "catch-up" services. Today, almost every major broadcaster around the world is operating an Internet television platform. Examples include the BBC, which introduced the BBC iPlayer on 25 June 2008 as an extension to its "RadioPlayer" and already existing streamed video-clip content, and Channel 4 that launched 4oD ("4 on Demand") (now All 4) in November 2006 allowing users to watch recently shown content. Most Internet television services allow users to view content free of charge; however, some content is for a fee. In the UK, the term catch up TV was most commonly used to refer to these sorts of services at the time.

Since 2012, around 200 over-the-top (OTT) platforms providing streamed and downloadable content have emerged. Investment by Netflix in new original content for its OTT platform reached $13bn in 2018.

== Binge-watching ==
In the 1990s, the practice of watching entire seasons in a short amount of time emerged with the introduction of the DVD box. Media-marathoning consists of watching at least one season of a TV show in a week or less, watching three or more films from the same series in a week or less, or reading three or more books from the same series in a month or less. The term "binge-watching" arrived with streaming TV, when Netflix launched its first original production, House of Cards, and started marketing this process of watching TV series episode after episode in 2013. COVID-19 gave another connotation to binge-watching, which was considered a negative activity.

== Broadcasting rights ==
Broadcasting rights (also called Streaming rights in this case) vary from country to country and even within provinces of countries. These rights govern the distribution of copyrighted content and media and allow the sole distribution of that content at any one time. An example of content only being aired in certain countries is BBC iPlayer. The BBC checks a user's IP address to make sure that only users located in the UK can stream content from the BBC. The BBC only allows free use of their product for users within the UK as those users have paid for a television license that funds part of the BBC. This IP address check is not foolproof as the user may be accessing the BBC website through a VPN or proxy server. Broadcasting rights can also be restricted to allowing a broadcaster rights to distribute that content for a limited time. Channel 4's online service All 4 can only stream shows created in the US by companies such as HBO for thirty days after they are aired on one of the Channel 4 group channels. This is to boost DVD sales for the companies who produce that media.

Some companies pay very large amounts for broadcasting rights with sports and US sitcoms usually fetching the highest price from UK-based broadcasters. A trend among major content producers in North America is the use of the "TV Everywhere" system. Especially for live content, the TV Everywhere system restricts viewership of a video feed to select Internet service providers, usually cable television companies that pay a retransmission consent or subscription fee to the content producer. This often has the negative effect of making the availability of content dependent upon the provider, with the consumer having little or no choice on whether they receive the product.

== Profits and costs ==
With the advent of broadband Internet connections, multiple streaming providers have come onto the market in the last couple of years. The main providers are Netflix, Hulu, and Amazon Prime Video. Some of these providers such as Hulu advertise and charge a monthly fee. Other such as Netflix and Amazon Prime Video charge users a monthly fee and have no commercials. Netflix is the largest provider with more than 217 million subscribers as of December 2021.

The rise of internet TV has resulted in cable companies losing customers to a new kind of customer called "cord cutters". Cord cutters are consumers who are cancelling their cable TV or satellite TV subscriptions and choosing instead to stream TV series, films and other content via the Internet. Cord cutters are forming communities. With the increasing availability of Online video platform (e.g., YouTube) and streaming services, there is an alternative to cable and satellite television subscriptions. Cord cutters tend to be younger people.

As streaming services raise prices in order to increase profit, consumers have begun to look for cheaper alternatives, some opting for Free Ad-Supported Streaming Television (FAST) instead. This has also led to leading streaming services such as Disney+ and Hulu to implement ad-supported tiers.

== Concerns ==
In recent years, customers have noticed shrinking content libraries and show cancellations. Examples include popular shows such as Westworld and originals such as Willow and The Mysterious Benedict Society. Often seen as a solution for cutting costs, streaming services remove assets with decreased earning power. Viewers and those involved in production have raised concerns surrounding this issue, creators losing out on "calling cards" and residual income; viewers having to invest in various platforms to watch select shows. Concerns about subscriber losses across services have also arisen, with Netflix being one of the many victims. Some argue that the surge in streaming is coming to an end due to the overabundance of media availability.

== Streaming television providers ==
=== Streaming platforms ===
==== United States ====
===== Amazon Prime Video =====
Logo used since 2024

Amazon Prime Video was launched in 2006 by Amazon. The platform was initially referred to as Amazon Unbox. After the debut of Amazon Prime — a subscription service that includes free shipping of purchased goods — Amazon Prime Video was developed as a feature included in the subscription, or with a stand-alone monthly subscription.

===== Apple TV =====
Logo used since 2019

Apple TV was launched in 2019 by Apple Inc. Originally branded as Apple TV+, it offers original content exclusively made by and for Apple, promoted as Apple Originals, which can only be found on Apple TV.

===== Disney+ =====
Logo used since 2024

Disney+ was launched in 2019 by The Walt Disney Company. Owned and operated by the Disney Entertainment division, it primarily distributes films and television series produced by Walt Disney Studios and Disney General Entertainment Content, with dedicated content hubs for the brands Disney, Pixar, Marvel, Star Wars, and National Geographic, as well as Star in some regions.

===== Hulu =====
Logo used since 2018

Hulu was launched in 2007, and is only available to viewers in the United States due to licensing restrictions. It is one of the few streaming platforms that provides current on-air television shows a few days after their original release on broadcast and cable television, but with limited availability. In 2019, The Walt Disney Company became the major owner of Hulu, after which it offered bundle deals where customers can subscribe to both Hulu and Disney+.

===== HBO Max =====
Logo used since 2025

HBO Max was launched in 2020 by Warner Bros. Discovery. HBO Max includes classic Warner Bros. films, in-house produced programs, and is the exclusively carrier of Studio Ghibli films in the United States.

===== Netflix =====
Logo used since 2014

Netflix began offering its subscribers the ability to watch some movies and TV shows online, directly from their homes, in 2007. Thereafter launching an only-streaming plan in the United States, with unlimited streaming, in 2010. More than 190 countries could subscribe to the streaming service by 2016.

===== Paramount+ =====
Logo used since 2021

Paramount+ was launched in 2014 by Paramount Global. Originally known as CBS All Access, it focused primarily on programs from local CBS stations as well as complete access to all CBS network content. In 2016, it began to produce original content that could only be found on the platform. It 2021, it was rebranded Paramount+ by ViacomCBS, and expanded to Latin America, Europe and Australia.

===== Peacock =====
Logo used since 2026

Peacock was launched in 2020 by Comcast. Operated through its entertainment division NBCUniversal, it primarily features content found on NBC network channels as well as other third-party sources. Additionally, Peacock now offers original content that cannot be found on any other streaming platform.

===== YouTube =====
Logo used since 2024

YouTube was launched in 2005 as an online video sharing and social media platform. In 2006, Google bought YouTube. YouTube stopped producing original programs in 2022.

===== YouTube TV =====
Logo used since 2024

YouTube TV was launched in 2017 by Google as a live streaming television service aimed at cord cutters. It offers linear channel feeds from broadcast and cable networks, and on-demand content. YouTube TV is available in the United States only.

=== Television services ===
==== IPTV ====
IPTV delivers television content using signals based on the Internet Protocol (IP), through managed private network infrastructure entirely owned by a single telecom or Internet service provider (ISP). Both IPTV and OTT use the Internet protocol over a packet-switched network to transmit data, but IPTV operates in a closed system—a dedicated, managed network controlled by the local cable, satellite, telephone, or fiber-optic company. IPTV subscribers have set-top boxes or other customer-premises equipment that communicate directly over company-owned or dedicated leased lines with central-office servers. IPTV services offer live TV and video on demand, but do not produce original content.

==== DirecTV ====
DirecTV (stylized in all caps as DIRECTV) is an American satellite and streaming television service that provides live TV stations and cable channels. The streaming service includes an on-demand library and premium channels, such as Starz and Cinemax, are available with additional subscription packages. DirecTV stopped offering original programs in 2020. The service is only available in the United States and Puerto Rico.

== See also ==
- The Business of Television
- Comparison of streaming media software
- Comparison of video hosting services
- Home theater PC
- Internet radio
- Interactive television
- List of free television software
- List of streaming media systems
- Livestreamed news
- Media psychology
- Multicast
- P2PTV
- Protection of Broadcasts and Broadcasting Organizations Treaty
- Push technology
- Software as a service
- Television broadcasting
- Video advertising
- Web-to-TV
- Webcast
- WPIX, Inc. v. ivi, Inc.
