= Hopper (DVR) =

Digital video recorder

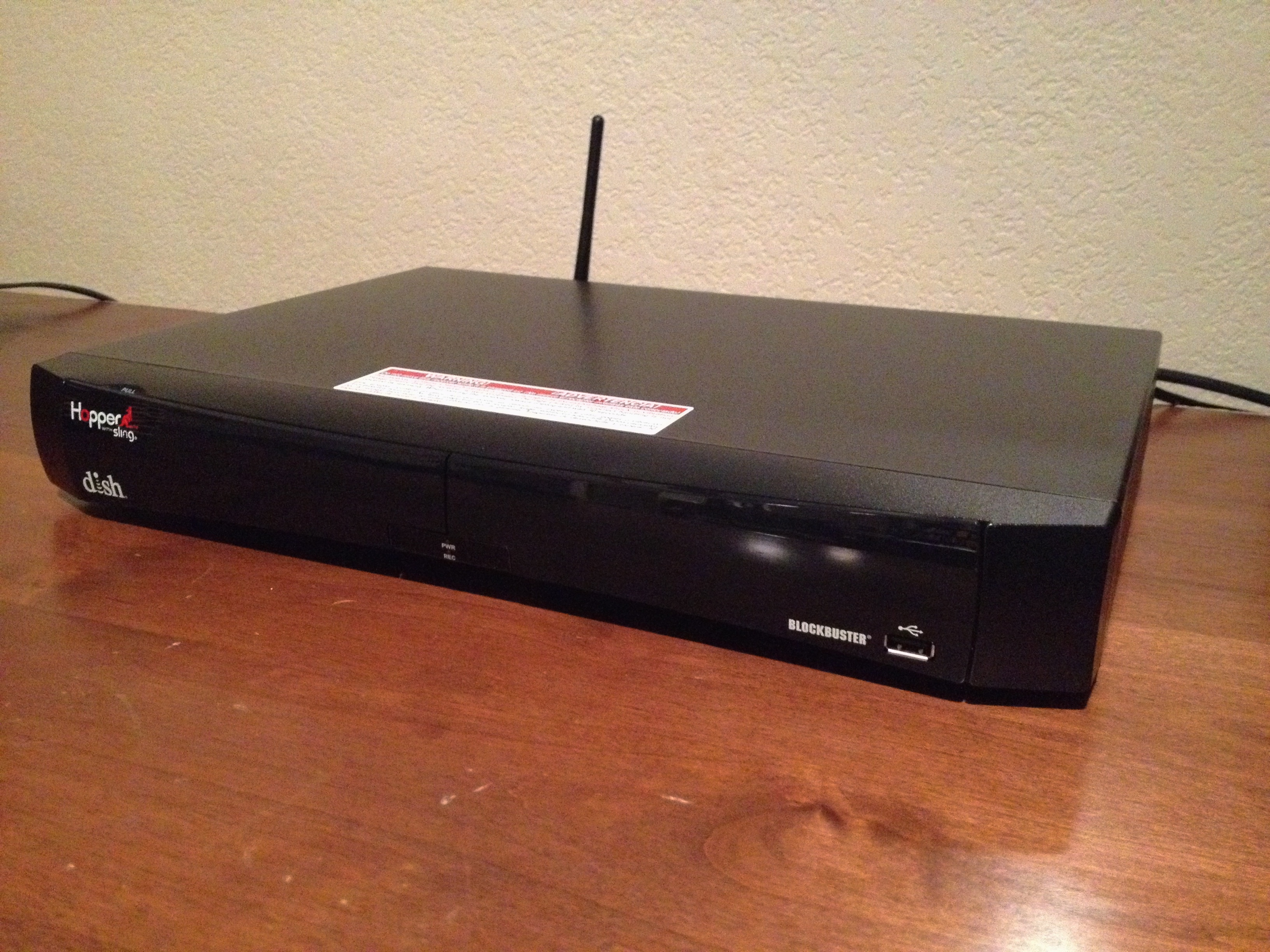
- Hopper with Sling box
- Developer: Dish Network
- Manufacturer: Echostar
- Type: Digital video recorder
- Released: March 2012
- System on a chip: Broadcom 7420; Broadcom 7425 (Hopper with Sling)
- Storage: 2 TB hard drive, expandable via eSATA
- Connectivity: Bluetooth, Coaxial cable, Ethernet; Wi-Fi (Hopper with Sling and Hopper 3 only)
- Website: dish.com/technology/hopper/

Hopper is a line of digital video recording (DVR) set-top boxes offered by the U.S. direct-broadcast satellite television provider Dish Network. First introduced at Consumer Electronics Show in January 2012, the Hopper was released in March 2012 as a component of the provider's whole-home DVR system, which networks the main Hopper unit with smaller "Joey" set-top boxes to form a client-server architecture.

The Hopper is primarily distinguished by its "Primetime Anytime" functionality, which automatically records primetime programming off the four major U.S. television networks, while a later software update added "AutoHop", which allows commercials to automatically be removed from these recordings. The following year at the Consumer Electronics Show, Dish Network introduced an updated version known as Hopper with Sling, which integrates Slingbox place-shifting technology directly into the box.

Both versions of the Hopper were met with universal praise by technology publications, particularly surrounding its "PrimeTime Anytime" functionality, the AutoHop feature, integration with smartphones and tablets, and the addition of built-in place-shifting to its second iteration. However, despite the positive reception, the Hopper became the subject of a copyright lawsuit filed by major U.S. broadcasters shortly after its release, who questioned the legality of the AutoHop feature by considering it to be an attack on their business model. Although unsuccessful in its lawsuits against Dish Network, ABC (Disney), CBS and Fox Broadcasting Company have since used carriage agreements and other settlements to impose requirements for AutoHop to be disabled on their respective primetime programs for a period after their original air date.

The Hopper with Sling model was the subject of a related controversy when its "Best in Show" award at CES was vetoed by CBS—whose website CNET issued the award on behalf of CES organizers, because it was a party of active litigation with Dish Network. Due to the conflict of interest and its opinion of the device as being "pro-innovation and pro-consumer", CES organizers removed CNET from the "Best in Show" program, and reinstated the award. After a lawsuit which shut down Aereo (a service that allowed users to rent an antenna from a centralized location to watch over-the-air television online) as an unauthorized "public performance" of copyrighted television programming, Fox argued in court that the place-shifting functionality of Hopper with Sling was "virtually identical" and thus also a violation. However, its claim was rejected by the court.

== Specifications ==
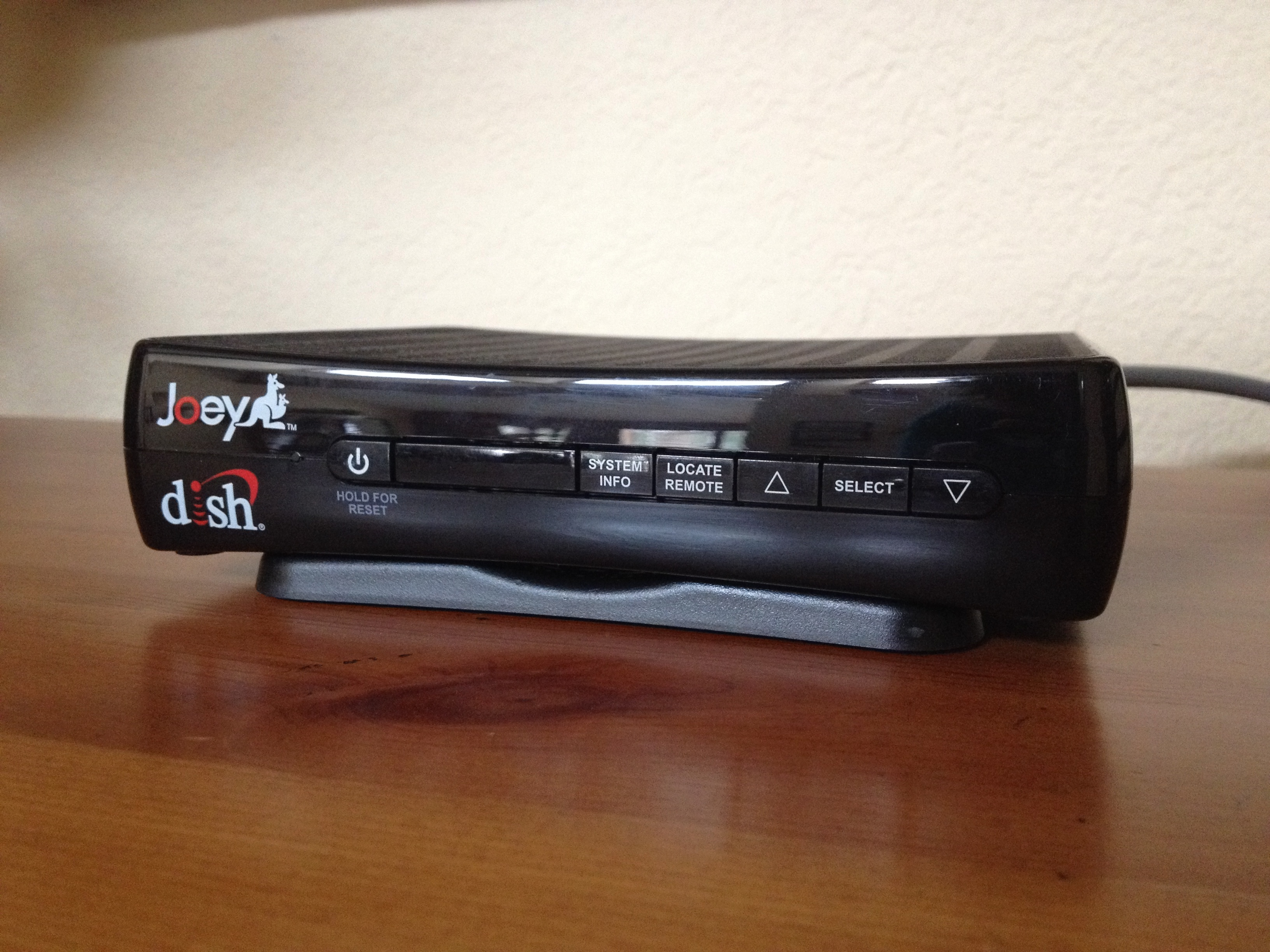
A Dish set-top-box, called Joey, used as a client for a Hopper

The Hopper is powered by a Broadcom 7420 system-on-chip, and contains a 2-terabyte hard drive; part of the drive is reserved for automatic recordings and video on demand content. The Hopper contains three satellite tuners, and can be networked with up to 3 smaller set-top boxes, known as a Joey, as clients for whole-home DVR access; they are attached to the main Hopper unit via coaxial cable. It also includes an Ethernet port, and eSATA and USB ports for attaching external storage. A Zigbee-based RF remote control is included. The Hopper with Sling model contains an upgraded Broadcom 7425 chip and built-in Wi-Fi, but is otherwise similar to the original model.

In January 2014, Dish Network unveiled new "Super Joey" and wireless Joey units; the Super Joey contains two additional network ports, allowing users to record up to eight programs at once (four from the major networks, four from other channels). "Virtual Joey" apps were also unveiled for LG smart TVs, PlayStation 3 and PlayStation 4, which allow the devices to act as set-top boxes.

In January 2015, Dish Network unveiled a 4K ultra HD Joey for release in mid-2015, which can stream 4K video from a Hopper downloaded via satellite, has the ability to display two HD channels at once picture-in-picture, and has a thin form factor designed to be mounted behind a television. Dish also unveiled a new simplified remote control for the Hopper featuring a clickable touchpad and a microphone for voice commands: upon its release, it became standard with new installations, and is purchasable as an add-on for existing systems.

In January 2016, Dish Network unveiled Hopper 3, a new revision with upgraded hardware, USB 3.0 support, 16 tuners, and a new "Sports Bar Mode" that displays a grid of multiple channels at once on 4K televisions.

== Features ==
The Hopper provides standard television functionality, including an electronic program guide, picture-in-picture support, and digital video recorder functionality. The "Primetime Anytime" feature uses one of the three tuners on the unit to automatically record primetime programming being broadcast by the four major U.S. television networks (ABC, CBS, NBC, and Fox) and presents them in a special menu; unless otherwise saved, these recordings are kept for 8 days. Internet-enabled apps on the Hopper on-launch included Blockbuster Video on Demand, CNBC, Facebook, MSNBC, Pandora Radio, Twitter, and The Weather Channel. In April 2012, a feature called "AutoHop" was added, which automatically edits commercial breaks out of the PrimeTime Anytime recordings. Due to contractual restrictions implemented since the launch of Hopper, AutoHop functionality is no longer available for ABC, CBS, or Fox programming within certain timeframes. In 2015, to promote Super Bowl XLIX, Dish Network allowed the "Primetime Anytime" and "AutoHop" features to function in reverse and allow users to view a recording of the Super Bowl that skipped over the game itself and only included the commercials.

With an optional adapter, the Hopper can be used with Slingbox for place-shifting. The Hopper with Sling model extends this ability as a built-in feature of the box itself, allowing the ability to watch live TV and DVR recordings online or through the Dish Anywhere mobile app for Android and iOS smartphones and tablets, and the ability to "fling" video from a mobile device (such as videos or photos) onto the TV as well. The Dish Anywhere app also allows DVR recordings to be downloaded from the DVR to the smartphone or tablet for offline viewing, and the Dish Explorer app also provides control of the Hopper along with integration with social networks to track trends and reactions to a program.

In July 2013, Dish Network introduced an SDK for developing third-party mobile apps that can integrate with the Hopper, and in September 2013, announced a partnership with Control4 to implement the ability to control and integrate with home automation systems through the device.

In January 2017, Dish announced that Hopper would soon support pairing with Amazon Echo smart speakers, and that Hopper 2 and 3 models would support multi-room music streaming via DTS Play-Fi. Google Assistant support via Google Home was also added the following year.

== Reception ==
Customer reviews are mixed. Som stating good storage and fast speeds while other have low reviews citing customer service problems. A simple Google search of Dish Hooper will show this. https://www.consumeraffairs.com/cable_tv/dish_network.html Reviews of customers of Dish have it listed at 1.2 out of 5 stars. There are reviews specifically saying there were problems with the DVR and customer service.

The Hopper was critically praised by various technology publications; PC Magazine gave the Hopper an "Excellent" rating of 4.5 out of 5, concluding that "It only has three tuners to the TiVo Elite's four and it doesn't suggest and automatically populate your DVR schedule based on your watching habits, but its price, clean design, and easy support for multi-room DVR make it a must-have for Dish Network subscribers." Engadget was similarly positive; despite noticing issues with certain aspects of its user interface, "all that being said, things will get much more interesting when other providers get on the whole-home DVR game and start to offer as many TV anywhere options as Dish, but for now the Hopper offers some unique, desirable features that you just can't get anywhere else."

PC Magazine gave the Hopper with Sling version a 5 out of 5, for "[packing] a staggering array of features into a single box that comes free with a Dish Network subscription package, and lets you watch satellite TV programming at home or anywhere you have an Internet connection. It easily earns our enthusiastic recommendation." CNET praised the Hopper with Sling for being cutting-edge technology that "helps Dish make a strong case that its HD DVR is the most advanced out there." It subsequently nominated the new Hopper for the CES Best in Show award (which was decided by CNET), and had won the award based on the original vote of CNET's staff. However, CNET's parent company CBS Corporation vetoed the results and disqualified the device for legal reasons.

=== AutoHop lawsuits ===
==== Copyright lawsuits ====
The AutoHop functionality of the Hopper was met with considerable legal controversy from the owners of the four major U.S. networks. Leslie Moonves, CBS chief executive, asked rhetorically how he is to produce CSI without the revenue stream of commercials. News Corporation refused to accept Dish advertising for the device. A Forrester Research analyst said the move demonstrated Dish's desperation to keep customers at a time when alternative programming is readily available via the Internet.

On May 24, 2012, Dish and the networks filed suit in federal court, the Dish case in Manhattan and the networks' cases in Los Angeles. On May 30, U.S. District Judge Laura Taylor Swain ruled the networks' cases should not be filed in Los Angeles and asked for comments on a possible move of all cases to New York. In the midst of the lawsuit, small-market television station owner Hoak Media Corporation pulled its 14 local stations from Dish Network on June 6, 2012, demanding a 200 percent increase in carriage fees and the dropping of the AutoHop feature. David Shull, Dish senior vice president of programming, accused Hoak of effectively telling Dish's customers that they must watch commercials, disrespecting customer control over its services. Eight days later, the two companies announced a distribution deal. Terms were not disclosed.

At a "Future of Video" hearing with the United States House Energy Subcommittee on Communications and Technology on June 27, 2012, Charlie Ergen made further remarks defending the legality of the Hopper and AutoHop, stating that the service "[does] nothing more than improving upon existing, legally accepted, and widely available technologies". He also remarked that with the feature, "allowing your kids to watch TV doesn’t have to mean they have no choice but to see commercials for junk food and alcohol." The next day, Michael Petricone of the Consumer Electronics Association spoke to the subcommittee, likening Hopper to earlier time shifting devices, and stating that the device would encourage people to watch TV more.

In preliminary judgement on July 9, Swain denied Dish's request to set aside the issue of copyright violations, ruling that Dish's argument lacked specificity. She also ruled that the case could be heard in Los Angeles, thereby eliminating New York as a potential venue. On November 7, 2012, the United States District Court for the Central District of California denied Fox's motion for preliminary injunction for the reasons mainly because PTAT and AutoHop did not infringe copyrights and did not breach the contract; and while QA copies constituted a copyright infringement and breached the contract, the harm from the copies was not irreparable, but was compensable with money. Fox appealed to the United States Court of Appeals for the Ninth Circuit. On July 24, 2013, the Ninth Circuit reviewed the district court's decision with a very deferential standard of review, and affirmed it.

In March 2014, Disney dropped its lawsuit against Dish Network with the signing of a comprehensive carriage deal for its networks (along with several new networks, such as Disney Junior, Longhorn Network, and SEC Network), including high definition feeds and TV Everywhere access for the networks and ABC owned-and-operated stations, and the ability to distribute their networks on a planned over-the-top internet television service. As a condition of the new deal, Dish Network agreed to disable the ability to use AutoHop on ABC programming within 72 hours of its original airing.

In June 2014, following a court decision which ruled that Aereo—a service which allowed users to rent an antenna to stream over-the-air television channels over the internet—was engaging in an unauthorized public performance of copyrighted television programming, Fox also argued to the Ninth Circuit that the place-shifting functionality of the Hopper with Sling boxes constituted "virtually identical" practices, "albeit also in violation of an express contractual prohibition", and that Dish "repeatedly raised" a defense that it was merely a provider of equipment and not the content streamed using it—which had been rejected during the Aereo case. Dish objected to Fox's claim, stating that "customers pay for the right to receive works, with Fox’s authorization, and do receive them at home before sending them to themselves," and that the device was not centrally controlled.

The Ninth Circuit ruled in favor of Dish Network, finding that Fox had "not shown a likelihood that Dish Network’s 'Dish Anywhere' and 'Hopper Transfers' technology would irreparably harm Fox before final adjudication", and in response to the claims regarding the Sling functionality, that "the Supreme court has all sorts of caveats in the opinion about how this was about Aereo and nothing else and a lot of the 'nothing elses' seem to be pretty similar to Slingbox." In December 2014, Dish Network reached a new carriage deal with CBS, restricting the use of AutoHop on CBS programming for seven days after its original airing. In February 2016, a similar settlement was made with Fox, in which AutoHop cannot be used on Fox programming for seven days after its original airing.

==== Parent infringement ====
In March 2023, Dish Network was ordered to pay $469 million to ClearPlay for infringing two patents associated with its parental control software in its implementation of AutoHop.

=== CES Best in Show controversy ===
At the 2013 Consumer Electronics Show, the staff of CNET—a technology news website owned by the CBS Interactive division of CBS, voted for the show's official Best in Show award on behalf of its organizers, the Consumer Electronics Association (CEA). CNET had named the Hopper with Sling as its winner; however, CBS abruptly disqualified the Hopper, and vetoed the results because the company was in active litigation with Dish Network. CNET also announced that it was no longer allowed to review products and services by companies that are in litigation with CBS. The new results subsequently gave the Best in Show award to the Razer Edge tablet instead.

Dish Network CEO Joe Clayton said that the company was "saddened that CNET’s staff is being denied its editorial independence because of CBS’ heavy handed tactics." On January 14, 2013, editor-in-chief Lindsey Turrentine addressed the situation, stating that CNET's staff were in an "impossible" situation due to the conflict of interest posed by the situation, and promised that she would do everything within her power to prevent a similar incident from occurring again. The conflict also prompted one CNET senior writer, Greg Sandoval, to resign.

The decision also drew the ire of staff from the CEA; CEO Gary J. Shapiro criticized the decision in a USA Today op-ed column and a statement by the CEA, stating that "making television easier to watch is not against the law. It is simply pro-innovation and pro-consumer." Shapiro felt that the decision also hurt the confidence of CNET's readers and staff, "destroying its reputation for editorial integrity in an attempt to eliminate a new market competitor." As a result of the controversy and fearing damage to the show's brand, the CEA announced on January 31, 2013 that CNET will no longer decide the CES Best in Show award winner due to the interference of CBS (the position would be offered to other technology publications), and the "Best in Show" award was jointly awarded to both the Hopper with Sling and Razer Edge.
