= Orb (software) =

Orb Caster
- Developer(s): Orb Networks
- Stable release: 3.20.0035 / October 4, 2012; 12 years ago
- Operating system: Mac OS X, Windows
- Available in: International (multiple languages)
- Type: Media player, media center, Place shifting
- License: Proprietary. Freeware for server, commercial shareware for portable players
- Website: www.orb.com

Orb was a freeware streaming software that enabled users to remotely access all their personal digital media files including pictures, music, podcasts, videos and television. It could be used from any Internet-enabled device, including laptops, pocket PC, smartphones, PS3, Xbox 360 and Wii video game consoles.

In 2013, Orb Networks, Inc. announced that they were acquired by a strategic partner and would be shutting down operations. Also in 2013, Co-founder Luc Julia indicated that Orb Networks' technology had been acquired by Qualcomm, but no accompanying press release had been issued.

Orb's website (accessed May, 2014) announced: "...about a year ago Orb's team and technology were acquired by Qualcomm Connected Experiences, Inc." and "Orb Networks will no longer be offering any Orb software downloads or support for our web based products such as OrbLive and Mycast." The statement invited people to "check out Qualcomm's AllPlay media platform" but did not specify how Orb software may have been utilized.

== What it did ==
Orb was available for Intel Macintosh, Windows or Media Center PCs. Users create an online account to remotely access their computer.

=== Access to videos, audio, images ===
All the music, pictures and video files stored on a home computer are made available for streaming, provided that the computer is connected to the Internet. The media files are transcoded and streamed directly from that PC, or available for download with the use of a file explorer plug-in.

The current version of Orb can be used as a replacement for Microsoft's Windows Media Connect software for computers running the Windows operating system. This allows the Xbox 360 or PlayStation 3 consoles to access the videos, audios, and images on the computer with Orb installed, natively. This allows the user to also watch videos not in the Windows Media Video format without having previously re-transcoded their videos. Orb will transcode the video files from the computer on the fly as they are requested as long as the computer running Orb has the correct codec for doing so.

=== Access to a tuner card or Webcam and Web-based DVR ===
If there is a TV tuner card installed on that PC, live TV is also available for streaming. Furthermore, Orb offers a DVR functionality, like a TiVo. One can schedule TV recordings and stream the recorded video files remotely via the Web-based interface.

The same is true for a webcam (there is also a webcam surveillance feature).

=== Sharing ===
Orb also allows the user to share photos and videos without having to upload them to an online service. To do that, one has to select the files one wants to share, and enter the email address of the person that should have access to that data. That person will receive an email with a link to view the files.

== Mobile phone usage ==
=== Supported mobile phones ===
Orb supports streaming to Windows Media, RealPlayer, 3gp and Flash format, supporting a wide range of 3G cell phones, including the iPhone.

=== Adaptive streaming inside a LAN or to a mobile phone ===
Orb will detect the type of device being used, and adapt the stream according to your player availability and the network quality.

For example, on the Nokia N80, Orb will use the native web browser and RealPlayer

When the device used to connect is on the same local network as the PC where Orb is running, it will connect directly to the stream from the PC without going through the Internet (provided no firewall blocks the connection). This provides a much higher bit rate and quality when streaming inside a LAN.

== New features in Orb 2.0 ==
Orb 2.0 beta is Ajax-based and offers a home page similar to Google Personalized Homepage or netvibes. It is organized into tabs, with each tab containing user-defined modules, such as TV guide, personal media files, RSS/Atom feeds such as YouTube videos, the local weather forecast, etc...

== Similar products ==
Similar solutions are Synology and Slingbox, which does not require a PC, but comes with its own hardware.

Another similar solution for remote access is ifunpix, which additionally includes tools to create and upload content to a personal mini-site support video as well as audio and music. Unlike Orb, iFunPix uses a proxy storage server between the user and the home computer which can help prevent attacks on the source computer. iFunPix is not able to stream live television.

There is also TVersity, another freeware program, much like orb. Other similar solution for remote access via mobile is Younity as well as Orbweb.me, both of those products enable mobile access to digital files in your computer.

Didiom was another widely used software solution that allowed users to remotely access and stream music, podcasts, and audiobook files from personal computers to smartphones. The company was acquired by Exclaim Mobility in 2011.
