= Jim Lanzone =

American businessman (born 1971)

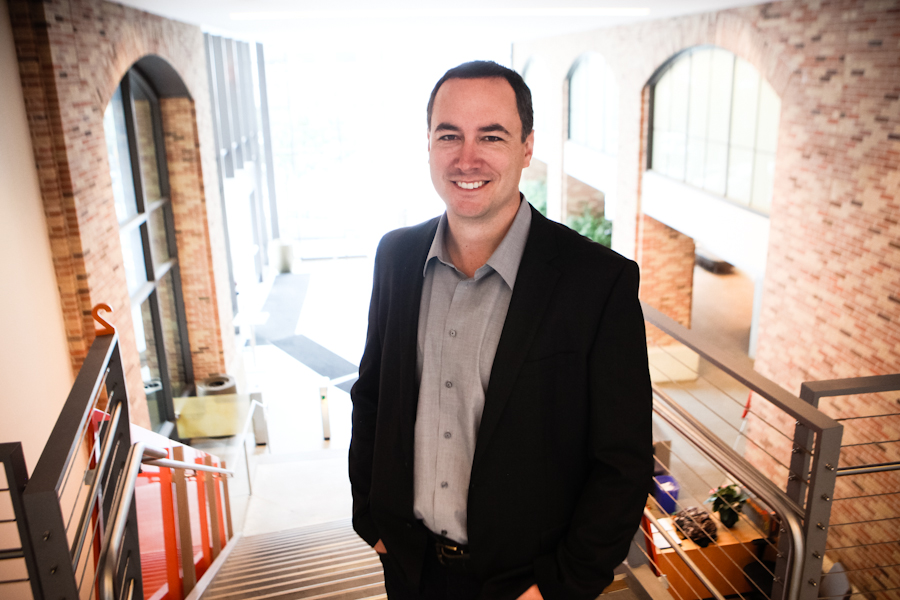
- Born: James Lanzone; January 20, 1971 (age 55); California, U.S.
- Education: University of California, Los Angeles (BA); Emory University (JD, MBA)
- Occupation: CEO of Yahoo Inc.
- Employer: Yahoo Inc.
- Spouse: Shannon
- Children: 3

James Lanzone (born January 20, 1971) is an American businessman and the CEO of Yahoo Inc. Previously, he was CEO of Tinder. He is also the former president and CEO of CBS Interactive, a top 10 Internet property that operated key websites including CBS All Access, CNET, GameSpot, CBS News, Metacritic, CBS Sports, 247 Sports, Scout Media, MaxPreps.com, TVGuide.com, Last.fm and many others. He took over as president from Neil Ashe in March 2011. Lanzone later became the first chief digital officer of CBS Corporation. Prior to joining CBS Interactive, Lanzone was the founder and CEO of Clicker.com, a search engine and discovery guide for Internet video and television funded by Bill Gurley of Benchmark Capital, Geoff Yang of Redpoint Ventures, Allen & Company, Qualcomm Ventures, Slingbox founder Blake Krikorian and several others. Clicker launched in beta at TechCrunch50 on September 14, 2009 and was acquired by CBS Corporation on March 4, 2011.

== Education ==
Lanzone graduated with a bachelor's degree in political science from the University of California, Los Angeles in 1993. He also holds a dual JD/MBA degree from Emory University School of Law and Emory University Business School.

== Career ==
In 1997, Lanzone co-founded eTour, an early provider of information retrieval and cost-per-lead services on the Web. By 1998, eTour had become a top 50 website and the Web's #1 ranked site in user frequency (1998 & 1999). Lanzone continued to serve as president of eTour until it was acquired by Ask.com (then known as Ask Jeeves) in May 2001.

In addition to Ask.com's purchase of eTour, Lanzone was hired to lead product management and later served as senior vice president and general manager of Ask.com. Ask.com was purchased by Barry Diller's IAC in 2005, and shortly afterward, Lanzone was named CEO of Ask.com. He held this position until leaving IAC in 2008 to join Redpoint Ventures as entrepreneur in residence. Upon his departure, Barry Diller credited Lanzone as "the principal executive responsible for Ask.com's turnaround". One of Lanzone's primary achievements as CEO was the overhaul and rebranding of Ask Jeeves (renamed Ask.com). Noted technology reviewer Walt Mossberg praised the new site as being "richer and better organized than typical Google results" and "took greater strides than Google with their user interface", while Chris Sherman of Search Engine Land called Ask.com the "Apple of Search". Lanzone has also been credited by search engine expert Danny Sullivan for popularizing the search engine trend of going beyond "10 blue links," instead "providing direct answers and new ways to interact with search results," later adopted by Google, Yahoo, Bing and other search engines.

During his time leading digital at CBS, Lanzone was best known for driving the development of the company's numerous streaming services, including the 2014 launch of CBS All Access, home to original shows such as Star Trek: Discovery, Star Trek: Picard, The Good Fight and Jordan Peele's reboot of The Twilight Zone. Lanzone's tenure as CEO also saw the development of the streaming services CBSN, CBS Sports HQ, ET Live (Entertainment Tonight), and several local versions of CBSN. CBS Interactive grew from approximately 70 million monthly unique users to more than 190 million monthly unique users in the United States during that time. In 2016, Lanzone was named by Leslie Moonves as the first chief digital officer in the history of CBS Corporation.

Lanzone departed ViacomCBS in December 2019, moving to Benchmark Capital to become executive-in-residence. On July 27, 2020, Match Group announced that it had appointed Lanzone as the new CEO of Tinder. On September 10, 2021, he was announced as the new CEO of Yahoo, after the company was sold by Verizon to Apollo Global Management.

=== Board memberships and investments ===
Lanzone serves on the board of directors at GoPro and the Newport Festivals Foundation, producer of the annual Newport Folk Festival and Newport Jazz Festival in Newport, Rhode Island. He is also an active investor in Houseparty, acquired by Epic Games; Resy, acquired by American Express; Aardvark, acquired by Google; Sapho, acquired by Citrix; Vurb, acquired by Snap; Tasty Labs, acquired by Walmart; Luvocracy, also acquired by Walmart; MasterClass; Thumbtack; Popshop Live and several others.

== Personal life ==
Lanzone is married to Shannon, a former prosecutor, and has three children.

== See also ==
- Les Moonves
- Sumner Redstone
- Shari Redstone
- Joseph Ianniello
- Barry Diller
- Joey Levin
- Bill Gurley
- Blake Krikorian
- Bruce S. Gordon
- Nick Woodman
- George Wein

Business positions
Preceded by Guru Gowrappan	Yahoo! CEO; 2021–present	Succeeded by n/a
Preceded by Elie Seidman	Tinder CEO; 2020–2021	Succeeded by Renate Nyborg
Preceded by n/a	Chief Digital Officer; 2016–2019	Succeeded by Marc DeBevoise
Preceded by Neil Ashe	CBS Interactive president and CEO; 2011–2019	Succeeded by Marc DeBevoise
Preceded by n/a	Clicker CEO; 2009–2011	Succeeded by n/a
Preceded by Steve Berkowitz	Ask.com CEO; 2006–2008	Succeeded by Jim Safka
Preceded by n/a	eTour; 1997–2001	Succeeded by n/a
