= Monsoon Multimedia =

Former television technology company

Monsoon Multimedia, Inc.
- Type: Private
- Industry: Video Streaming and Placeshifting
- Founded: 2004
- Headquarters: Noida, India (world headquarters); San Mateo, California, United States (division); Tomsk, Russia (division)
- Products: Vulkano; HAVA line
- Website: https://web.archive.org/web/20121220063904/http://www.monsoonmultimedia.com/

Monsoon Multimedia was a company that manufactured, developed and sold video streaming and place-shifting devices that allowed consumers to view and control live television on PCs connected to a local (home) network or remotely from a broadband-connected PC or mobile phone. On the event of Cisco acquiring Monsoon in 2017, EchoStar, the new parent of Sling sued Monsoon for patent infringement (of the Japanese patents), having obtained confidential information about the date of the acquisition by Cisco from a Monsoon employee under murky circumstances. Monsoon settled the lawsuit by agreeing not to sell its products in the USA simply because it did not have the legal funds to fight mighty Echostar's legal maneuvers. EchoStar thus successfully removed its only competitor from the market place. This meant Monsoon's death knell.

The devices enabled streaming and recording of video content from video sources including live TV, DVD players, video game consoles, and TiVo to multiple PCs wirelessly. Multiple users could connect to the HAVA from any Internet connection simultaneously with channel-changing capabilities and full operation of the video source. The devices allowed a PC to operate as a personal video recorder with pause, fast forward and rewind functions. The HAVA device also worked as a TV tuner for Windows Media Center-enabled PCs without being directly connected to a video source.

In 2018 the Monsoon Website was suddenly closed with no placeholder left to advise of closure, and the company's central server (which coordinated all remote access to Hava and Vulkano devices), ceased to respond at the company IP address coded in the device firmware and remote viewing software.

As of late 2018, Downloads of iPad and iPhone software for remote viewing are no longer available on Apple's iTunes App Store.

As of early 2019 it is not known if there are any active projects to restore functionality of these devices remotely, since the company's server closed. However, they continue to function on a local network.

== History ==
Monsoon Multimedia was created in 2004 by the founders of Dazzle and Emuzed. HAVA's main engineering and development operations are based in Tomsk, Russia, and New Delhi, India. In 1996, the founder of Monsoon Multimedia, Prabhat Jain, founded Dazzle, where he developed the PC hardware and software products to compress video based on MPEG standards. In 2000, he founded Emuzed, where Prabhat Jain created a TiVo-type product for the PC based on Microsoft's Media Center Edition PC operating system.

In November 2008, Prabhat Jain announced the appointment of consumer technology industry veteran William Loesch as CEO of the company. Loesch brought 30 years of experience in the computer software and hardware industries, primarily in the consumer digital video sector. Loesch is not currently listed on the company website as an active member of the team (11/2/2011).

== GPL and Patent lawsuits ==
What was claimed to be the first US lawsuit over a GPL violation concerned use of BusyBox in an embedded device. The lawsuit, case 07-CV-8205 in the United States District Court for the Southern District of New York was filed on 20 September 2007 by the Software Freedom Law Center (SFLC) on behalf of the Busybox developers against Monsoon Multimedia Inc., after BusyBox code was discovered in a firmware upgrade and attempts to contact the company had apparently failed. The case was settled with release of the Monsoon version of the source and payment of an undisclosed amount of money to Andersen and Landley.

In January 2013 Sling Media filed suit alleging infringement of five patents, against both Belkin International and Monsoon Multimedia in the United States District Court for the Northern District of California. The Belkin part of the suit was settled in May 2013, and in December 2013 the United States International Trade Commission found that Monsoon was indeed violating the patents. The commission issued cease-and-desist orders and banned the importation of Monsoon Multimedia products into the United States.

== Devices ==
Monsoon Multimedia's line of place-shifting devices enabled multiple networked PCs within the home to simultaneously view live TV or DVR content. The number of PCs and mobile device that could connect to a single Monsoon device were limited only by the bandwidth of the network or broadband connection. Only one remote client at a time could view a place-shifted program, but the remote device could be watching while multiple home PCs watched the same program.

=== Vulkano ===
Released in August 2010, the Vulkano added an electronic program guide to its PC software, as well as support for YouTube video streaming on TV with an included remote control, as well as future support for Netflix and other streaming video services. Future Google TV web-browsing support was planned for 2011. There was also a Vulkano model that included a 500 GB external hard drive for DVR recordings, which could be accessed from mobile devices. The Vulkano did not support Windows Media Center integration as the previous HAVA models did, but included UPnP technology for photo, music, and video streaming from PCs and mobile devices. In November 2010, Monsoon added a Vulkano Platinum model, which did not include any storage drive, program guide, or recording capabilities.

=== Vulkano Flow ===
Announced at the 2011 Consumer Electronics Show, the Vulkano Flow was a mobile accessory. When connected to any set-top box the Vulkano Flow could stream TV content to mobile devices inside or outside of the home. It was to be available for $99.

=== Vulkano Blast ===
Also announced at the 2011 Consumer Electronics Show, the Vulkano Blast integrated DVR, web video, placeshifting, Universal Plug and Play streaming UPnP, Mobile Video Recording and 160 GB internal storage. Its approximate price was $200.

=== HAVA Gold ===
Controlled digital cable, satellite, or DVR TV programming on any PC or mobile device.

=== HAVA Platinum HD ===
Controlled high-definition digital cable, satellite or DVR TV programming on any PC or mobile phone. Turned a PC into personal video recorder (PVR) by recording TV shows to the hard disk or watch TV from Microsoft’s Media Center in any room within a home.

The HAVA Platinum HD also included component inputs and had the ability to transmit a HD program in widescreen aspect ratio, though not in full HD resolution. The HAVA Platinum took a 720p or 1080i signal and converted it to standard-definition resolution before streaming it over a network or over the Internet. This device also added PC software that stored streamed content, enabling the PC or laptop to pause, rewind and fast-forward streamed content. The stored program could also be burned to DVD.

=== HAVA Wireless HD ===
Controlled HD digital cable, satellite, or DVR programs Wirelessly on any WiFi-enabled PC or mobile phone. It could stream wirelessly, DVD-quality video direct from the TV source to multiple Media Center PCs simultaneously. It could also pause, rewind, fast forward, and record live TV programs on a PC.

=== HAVA Titanium HD WiFi ===
Controlled HD digital cable, satellite, or DVR programs wirelessly on any WiFi enabled PC or mobile phone. It could stream wirelessly, DVD quality video direct from the TV source to multiple Windows Vista or Media Center PCs simultaneously.

The HAVA Titanium HD added Wi-Fi to make a wireless connection to a Wi-Fi-equipped broadband router or modem, and it featured two USB ports. One was for plugging in an external USB HDD drive that could then be used as a DVR. The other USB port was for the included Wi-Fi 802.11g adapter, which sat in a cradle and was connected to a 3-foot USB cable so the adapter could be located in a spot with good reception.

== Software interface ==
The HAVA devices came with a HAVA Player software interface that was downloaded onto the user's PC or mobile phone. This interface enabled the user to send remote control commands from their PC to their TV source. This was done through the included wide range of virtual remote control designs. The Vulkano device included an electronic program guide (EPG) enabled software player.

As of late 2018, software downloads were no longer available from Monsoon's defunct website.

== Mobile players ==
=== Vulkano players ===
With the release of the Vulkano in August 2010, Monsoon introduced free Vulkano players for the iPad and iPhone, which only support WiFi, and not yet 3G connections. Monsoon also released an Android and BlackBerry player, and planned a future release for Symbian.

As of late 2018, iPad and iPhone player software was no longer available for download on Apple's iTunes App Store.

=== HAVA players ===
Monsoon Multimedia announced support for Windows Mobile in May 2007 enabling users to connect to the HAVA and view video content from video sources such as live TV from a smartphone, pocket PC or PDA.

In April 2008, Monsoon Media announced HAVA Player support for the Nokia N800, N810 and N810 WiMax Internet Tablets enabling users to connect to a HAVA device to view and control video content from video sources such as live TV from a Nokia Internet Tablet.

In May 2008, Monsoon Multimedia announced the HAVA Player for S60, HAVA support for Symbian S60 3rd edition mobile phones. The HAVA Player for S60 enabled users to connect to a HAVA device to view and control their home TV from S60 mobile phones.

In September 2009, the HAVA Player was released to the Apple iPhone and the iPod Touch. The app is free, but is not 3G-enabled.

== Closure of Monsoon Website and Servers ==
In 2018 the company disappeared; because by design all the players were using the company's central server to locate devices for remote viewing, when the server went down, all Hava and Vulkano devices have become useless. This was primarily due to the Company running out of funds because of the US District Court's order to not sell any of its products.

The company failure left all device owners disappointed with no alternative solution: relief could have been provided if a direct connection had been made possible between viewing software to user device, based on IP address without requiring access to a central server like Slingbox player option.

== Alternative players and hacking ==
A 3rd party player was developed for Linux and Windows. Development was stopped in late 2009.

There was an attempt to hack the Hava devices to make them work with the new Vulkano player. The password for the root user was found (QwertyU1) so an access over telnet is possible.

== See also ==
- Slingbox
- LocationFree Player
- HDHomeRun
- Dreambox
- DBox2
