= TV2Me =

Device for watching TV from any location

TV2Me is a device that allows TV viewers to watch their home's cable or satellite television programs on their own computers, mobile phones, television sets and projector screens anywhere in the world. "This technology gives users the ability to shift space, and to watch all the cable or satellite TV channels of any place they choose on any Internet connected device."

== History ==
TV2Me was invented by Ken Schaffer, who began working on it in 2001, when he was working overseas. His goal was to watch his favorite American shows through any kind of device from wherever he was. With a team of Turkish and Russian programmers he developed circuitry that allows the MPEG-4 encoder to operate more efficiently and to generate a better picture. Schaffer, who was known for having previously invented the Schaffer–Vega diversity system, the first practical wireless guitar and microphone system for major rock bands, and for developing satellite tracking systems that allowed U.S. agencies and universities to monitor internal television of the then Soviet Union, launched TV2Me in December 2003. TV2Me introduced the concept of placeshifting and started an entire industry.

== Operation ==
To set up TV2Me, the cable or satellite box and a broadband internet connection are plugged in the device. "The server requires an Internet connection with an upstream speed of 512 kb/s or higher." On the receiving end (for example the computer), any browser can be used to view in real-time or with a 6-second delay. The delayed mode uses the extra time to produce a slightly better picture. No additional software needs to be installed. "The "target" (receiving location) can be anywhere there's a broadband connection. The viewer can use virtually any PC running Windows, Mac, Linux and Solaris."

== Copyrights ==
No copyright infringement has been set for this placeshifting device but this technology is problematic to many copyright holders because it sidesteps what is known in legalese as proximity control, which restricts the distribution of content to specific regions and times. "It's a standard contractual stipulation for the MPAA, whose member studios license distribution rights to movies for distinct territories; the NFL, which considers geographic limits the linchpin of lucrative television deals, including its Sunday Ticket pact with DirecTV; and local television stations, which pay millions of dollars for exclusive territorial rights to all kinds of programming." On this issue, Ken Schaffer's position has been: "The TV2Me user paid for the rights to watch these programs. What separates him from other cable subscribers is that he has a long extension cord."

== See also ==
- Spaceshifting / placeshifting
- Copyright
- Private copying
- Schaffer-Vega Diversity System
