= Ken Schaffer =

American inventor

Ken Schaffer (born 1947) is an American inventor and former publicist.

== Inventor ==
In 1975 Schaffer invented the Schaffer–Vega diversity system, a low-noise/wide dynamic range wireless guitar system that was form-factored as a wireless microphone in 1976. Schaffer–Vega made approximately one thousand wireless systems that retailed for $4,400 each. Among the first bands to adopt the system were the Rolling Stones, Kiss, and AC/DC. Additionally, NASA used Schaffer's wireless microphones to improve astronaut voice communication.

In the 1980s, Schaffer developed a satellite tracking system that made it possible for United States intelligence agencies to monitor the internal television of the then-Soviet Union. The system tapped into the Soviet Molniya non-geosynchronous satellite constellation, which carried Moscow television to the Far North. With software engineer Warren Musselman, he developed an Apple II-based automatic tracking system based on a red 3 meter (10') dish on the roof of Columbia University's International Affair Institute in Manhattan, allowing Soviet Studies graduate students to watch live Russian television. Other systems were installed at the University of Virginia, Charlottesville, The University of Michigan (Ann Arbor), The University of Pennsylvania, and various private owners. Schaffer then conceived and executed a project through which the fledgling Discovery Channel devoted a week to carrying Russian TV, for which he shared the National Cable Television Association's Golden Ace award.

In 2003, Schaffer invented a device called TV2Me, which enables customers to access their cable TV channels from anywhere in the world via a broadband Internet connection. The concept TV2Me introduced became known as 'placeshifting', as opposed to 'timeshifting'. The first TV2Me unit was purchased by musician Sting, who used it especially to follow his favourite football team, Newcastle United as he toured.

== Publicist ==
In the late 1960s and 1970s, Schaffer was publicist for Jimi Hendrix, Steven Tyler of Aerosmith, Todd Rundgren, Alice Cooper and for the Comet Kohoutek (on behalf of the American Museum of Natural History's Hayden Planetarium), among others, and in the 1980s Boris Grebenshchikov. Schaffer designed and custom built the guitar John Lennon used on his last album, Double Fantasy and promoted Lennon's favorite movie, Alejandro Jodorowsky's El Topo, which ignited the cult of the Midnight Movie. In 1987, Schaffer conceived of a project which brought Russian singer/songwriter Boris Grebenshchikov, often described as the "Bob Dylan of Russia" to the West. Grebenshchikov recorded an album for Columbia Records produced by Dave Stewart that featured Eurythmics's Annie Lennox and the Pretenders' Chrissie Hynde was the first music collaboration between a Russian and Westerners. The project was documented by director Michael Apted in "The Long Way Home", who filmed Schaffer and Grebenshchikov in Saint Petersburg, Moscow, London, New York and Los Angeles.

== Personal life ==
Schaffer was married to Belarusian actress Alla Kliouka, who played Svetlana Kirilenko on HBO's The Sopranos.
