= Blake Krikorian =

American tech entrepreneur (1967-2016)

Blake G. Krikorian
- Born: August 18, 1967; Santa Clara County, California, U.S.
- Died: August 3, 2016 (aged 48); Pacifica, California, U.S.
- Education: University of California at Los Angeles
- Known for: Slingbox co-founder
- Board member of: Andreessen Horowitz; Amazon.com; Microsoft; FreeWheel
- Children: 2
- Relatives: Adam Krikorian (brother)

Blake G. Krikorian (August 18, 1967 – August 3, 2016) was an American technology executive and entrepreneur, co-founder of Sling Media.

== Early life and education ==
Krikorian was born into an Armenian-American family, the eldest son of Gary Krikorian and Joyce (née Srabian). Krikorian graduated from Mountain View High School in Mountain View, California, and in 1989 earned a bachelor's degree in mechanical engineering from the University of California, Los Angeles. In high school he was an all-league water polo player and swimmer and was chosen for the Junior National Team in water polo in 1985; he played water polo for the UCLA Bruins from 1986 to 1989.

== Career ==
Krikorian worked first at General Magic, then in 1994 was a co-founder of Philips Mobile Computing Group, where he was Group Product Manager. He then became Senior Vice President at Metis Associates and led its incubation of Mainbrace Corporation.

In 2004 he co-founded Sling Media, a consumer electronics company that builds the Slingbox, with his brother Jason Krikorian. He served as its CEO. It was purchased in 2007 by Echostar Communications for $380 million; Krikorian remained CEO and a company director until 2009. In January that year he became CEO of id8 Group Productions, where he founded id8 Group R2 Studios in 2011; after that company's acquisition by Microsoft, he became head of Microsoft's interactive entertainment business division.

Krikorian served on the boards of a number of companies, including Amazon.com in 2011–2012. He was also a board partner at the venture capital company Andreessen Horowitz and was an angel investor in companies including Clicker.com, FreeWheel, Jaunt, Doppler Labs, and Thync.

== Personal life and death ==
Krikorian's brother Adam coached the US women's water polo team to gold medals at the 2012 Summer Olympics the 2016 Summer Olympics, and the 2020 Summer Olympics. He was married and had two daughters. He died of a heart attack on August 3, 2016, at the age of 48, after paddleboarding in Pacifica, California.
