= Clicker (disambiguation) =

Clicker may refer to:

Devices

- Clicker, a device that makes a clicking sound
- Clicker (classroom), a device for collecting feedback from an audience
- A slide projector
- Another name for a remote control

Other

- Boot and shoe clicker, a person who cuts the leather for making shoes and other footwear
- Shorthand for clicker game
- Clicker.com, a website
- A zombie-like enemy in The Last of Us video game
