= Copyright law of Aruba =

Auteursverordening
- Long title: Auteursverordening 2003 no. GT 10
- Citation: Auteursverordening
- Territorial extent: Aruba
- Enacted: 23 October 2003
- Status: In force

Copyright in Aruba is codified in the Auteursverordening. The verordening (act) codifies copyright, and exceptions and limitations to copyright. The act is derived from the Dutch Copyright Act 1912 and has deviated since then. Copyright in Aruba recognises that products in the field of literature, science or art, in whatever manner or form it is reproduced are protected by copyright. This includes translations and medium shifting.

The Aruba copyright act follows the civil law tradition, one of the key aspects of this is that it does not have fair use or fair dealing, instead it has a limited list of exceptions and limitations to copyright.

== Protected subject matter ==
Copyright in Aruba recognises that products in the field of literature, science or art, in whatever manner or form it is reproduced are protected by copyright. This includes translations and medium shifting.

No copyright is assigned to governmental acts or decisions by the courts. No copyright is assigned to publications by the government of Aruba, unless it is expressly reserved.

=== Moral rights ===
Aruba recognises moral rights (or personality rights) for the duration of copyright. This includes the rights of attribution or paternity and the right of integrity of the work.

== Duration of copyright ==
The duration of copyright in Aruba last until January 1, 50 years after the year of death of the latest living author of a copyright protected work. There are however exceptions for anonymous works, works authored by an organisation, and posthumously published works. In these cases the term of protection of copyright ends on January 1, 50 years after the year of publication of the work. Photographs, cinematography and similar works have a similar duration, 50 years after the year of first lawful publication.

Aruba recognises the rule of the shorter term, if a work is in the public domain in the country of origin is it also in the public domain in Aruba.

== Exceptions and limitations ==
Chapter 1 § 6 of the act details the exceptions and limitations to copyright on Aruba. In summary they can be described as:

- Press exception – Unless expressly reserved it is allowed to copy news articles by other press media.
- Education exception – It is allowed to use short excerpts of copyright protected works for educational or of scientific purposes
- Private Copying – It is allowed to make a small number of copies
- Panorama exception – It is allowed to make images from copyright protected works if they are visible from the public road. These reproductions must show the work in its context, they cannot solely reproduce the work in itself.
- Public safety exception – Authorities are allowed to make reproductions of images in the line of their duties.
- Sale or exhibition exception – Unless expressly reserved, it is allowed to reproduce a work for the purpose for public sale or public exhibition.

Additionally, painters are always allowed to create similar works as works already created, even when they have transferred their rights.

== Portrait rights ==
The act codifies portrait rights in articles 19, 20, and 21. Portrait rights are rights assigned to the portrayed, they should not be confused with personality rights. The act recognises two types of portraits: commissioned portraits, and non-commissioned portraits

=== Commissioned portraits ===
Commissioned portraits need permission by the people who are portrayed before they can be made public. The portrayed can reserve the right up until 10 years after their death, inherited by parents, spouse or children. Additionally portrayed can permit the publication of photographic portrait in press or magazines without permission of the rights holder. Attribution to the photographer is mandatory

=== Non-commissioned portraits ===
Publication of portraits that are not commissioned is allowed unless the portrayed can indicate reasonable interest not to have the portrait published.

== Bureau of intellectual property Aruba ==
The Bureau of intellectual property Aruba has a copyright registry. While registration is not mandatory to receive copyright protection, registered works can be used as a proof of authorship in disputes.

== International treaties ==
Aruba is a signatory of Berne Convention for the Protection of Literary and Artistic Works (1886). The convention has seen updates since then. Aruba is not a signatory of the latest iterations. It is likely a signatory of the Rome Act of 1928 and not the more recent Paris Act.

Aruba has chosen not to adopt a proposal for the protection of performing rights.

== See also ==
- Copyright
- Copyleft
- Berne Convention
