= HDHomeRun =

TV tuner product family by SiliconDust

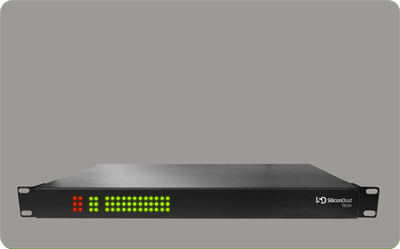
A rack-mounted HDHomeRun

HDHomeRun is a network-attached digital television tuner box, produced by the company SiliconDust USA, Inc.

== Overview ==
Unlike standard set-top box (or set-top unit) appliances, the HDHomeRun does not have a video output that connects directly to the user's television. It instead receives a live TV signal and then streams the decoded video over a local area network to an existing smartphone, tablet computer, smart TV, streaming device, computer, or game console. This allows it to stream content to multiple viewing locations.

== Compatibility ==
The HDHomeRun can be controlled and viewed from a wide variety of DVR/PVR software, including Windows Media Center for Windows XP through 8.1, EyeTV 3 for macOS, and Myth TV for Linux.

Newer models of the HDHomeRun are DLNA certified.

== HDHomeRun Tuners ==
Consumer Tuners

Line	Model	Part Number	Number of Tuners	Tuners								Coax Ports	CableCARD Slots	USB	Hard Drive	DLNA/UPnP	Hardware Transcoder	Notes
Line	Model	Part Number	Number of Tuners	ATSC 1.0	QAM 64/256	ATSC 3.0	CableCard	DVB-T	DVB-T2	DVB-C	ISDB-T	Coax Ports	CableCARD Slots	USB	Hard Drive	DLNA/UPnP	Hardware Transcoder	Notes
Flex	Flex 4K	HDFX-4K	4	Yes	Yes	Yes (2 of 4 tuners)	No	No	No	No	No	1	0	Yes	No	Yes	No	
Flex	Flex 4K; Development Edition	HDFX-4K-DEV	4	Yes	Yes	Yes (2 of 4 tuners)	No	No	No	No	No	1	0	Yes	No	Yes	No	Comes with developer firmware for deep signal inspection/tinkering
Flex	Flex Duo	HDFX-2US	2	Yes	Yes	No	No	No	No	No	No	1	0	Yes	No	Yes	No	
Flex	Flex Quatro	HDFX-4US	4	Yes	Yes	No	No	No	No	No	No	1	0	Yes	No	Yes	No	
Flex	Flex Quatro	HDFX-4DT	4	No	No	No	No	Yes	Yes	Yes	No	1	0	Yes	No	Yes	No	
Connect	Connect 4K	HDHR5-4K	4	Yes	Yes	Yes (2 of 4 tuners)	No	No	No	No	No	1	0	No	No	Yes	No	
Connect	Connect Duo	HDHR5-2US	2	Yes	Yes	No	No	No	No	No	No	1	0	No	No	Yes	No	
Connect	Connect Duo	HDHR5-2DT	2	No	No	No	No	Yes	Yes	Yes	No	1	0	No	No	Yes	No	
Connect	Connect Quatro	HDHR5-4US	4	Yes	Yes	No	No	No	No	No	No	1	0	No	No	Yes	No	
Connect	Connect Quatro	HDHR5-4DT	4	No	No	No	No	Yes	Yes	Yes	No	1	0	No	No	Yes	No	
Connect	Connect	HDHR4-2US	2	Yes	Yes	No	No	No	No	No	No	1	0	No	No	Yes	No	
Connect	Connect	HDHR4-2DT	2	No	No	No	No	Yes	Yes	No	No	1	0	No	No	Yes	No	
Connect	Connect	HDHR4-2IS	2	No	No	No	No	No	No	No	Yes	1	0	No	No	Yes	No	
Scribe	Scribe 4K	HDVR-4K-1TB	4	Yes	Yes	Yes (2 of 4 tuners)	No	No	No	No	No	1	0	No	1TB	Yes	No	
Scribe	Scribe Duo	HDVR-2US-1TB	2	Yes	Yes	No	No	No	No	No	No	1	0	No	1TB	Yes	No	
Scribe	Scribe Quatro	HDVR-4US-1TB	4	Yes	Yes	No	No	No	No	No	No	1	0	No	1TB	Yes	No	
Dual		HDHR3-US	2	Yes	Yes	No	No	No	No	No	No	1	0	No	No	No	No	
Dual		HDHR3-DT	2	No	No	No	No	Yes	No	No	No	1	0	No	No	No	No	
Dual		HDHR3-EU	2	No	No	No	No	Yes	No	Yes	No	1	0	No	No	No	No	
Dual		HDHR-US	2	Yes	Yes	No	No	No	No	No	No	2	0	No	No	No	No	
Dual		HDHR-EU	2	No	No	No	No	Yes	No	Yes	No	2	0	No	No	No	No	
Single		HDHR-US-T1	1	Yes	Yes	No	No	No	No	No	No	1	0	No	No	No	No	
Extend		HDTC-2US	2	Yes	Yes	No	No	No	No	No	No	1	0	No	No	Yes	MPEG2 → h.264	Plastic case and fan
Extend		HDTC-2US-M	2	Yes	Yes	No	No	No	No	No	No	1	0	No	No	Yes	MPEG2 → h.264	Metal case, fanless
Extend		HDTC-2US-L	2	Yes	Yes	No	No	No	No	No	No	1	0	No	No	Yes	MPEG2 → h.264	2US converted to fanless case
Expand		HDHR3-4DC	4	No	No	No	No	No	No	Yes	No	1	0	No	No	Yes	No	5V 2A power adapter
Expand		HDHR5-4DC	4	No	No	No	No	No	No	Yes	No	1	0	No	No	Yes	No	5V 1.5A power adapter
Prime		HDHR3-CC	3	No	Yes	No	Yes	No	No	No	No	1	1	Yes	No	Yes	No	USB for Tuning Adapter only
Prime		HDHR3-6CC-3x2	6	No	Yes	No	Yes	No	No	No	No	1	2	Yes	No	Yes	No	USB for Tuning Adapter only
Prime		HDHR5-6CC	6	No	Yes	No	Yes	No	No	No	No	1	1	Yes	No	Yes	No	Unreleased, canceled

Commercial Tuners

Line	Part Number	Number of Tuners	Tuners								Coax Ports	CableCARD Slots	USB	Hard Drive	DLNA/UPnP	Hardware Transcoder	Rackmount	Notes
Line	Part Number	Number of Tuners	ATSC 1.0	QAM 64/256	ATSC 3.0	CableCard	DVB-T	DVB-T2	DVB-C	ISDB-T	Coax Ports	CableCARD Slots	USB	Hard Drive	DLNA/UPnP	Hardware Transcoder	Rackmount	Notes
Tech	TECH3-6CC-3X2	6	No	Yes	No	Yes	No	No	No	No	2	2	Yes	No	No	No	Yes	
Tech	TECH4-8US-2X4	8	Yes	Yes	No	No	No	No	No	No	4	0	No	No	No	No	Yes	
Tech	TECH4-8DT2x4	8	No	No	No	No	Yes	Yes	Yes	No	4	0	No	No	No	No	Yes	
Tech	TECH4-2US	2	Yes	Yes	No	No	No	No	No	No	1	0	No	No	No	No	No	
Tech	TECH4-2DT	2	No	No	No	No	Yes	Yes	Yes	No	1	0	No	No	No	No	No	
Tech	TECH4-2IS	2	No	No	No	No	No	No	No	Yes	1	0	No	No	No	No	No	
Tech	TECH4-8IS	8	No	No	No	No	No	No	No	Yes	4	0	No	No	No	No	Yes	
Tech	TECH5-4K	4	Yes	Yes	Yes (2 of 4 tuners)	No	No	No	No	No	1	0	No	No	No	Yes (ATSC 3.0 → MPEG-TS)	No	
Tech	TECH5-4K8-2X4	8	Yes	Yes	Yes	No	No	No	No	No	4	0	No	No	No	No	Yes	
Tech	TECH5-16US-4X4	16	Yes	Yes	No	No	No	No	No	No	4	0	No	No	No	No	Yes	
Tech	TECH5-16DT-4X4	16	No	No	No	No	Yes	Yes	Yes	No	4	0	No	No	No	No	Yes	
Tech	TECH5-16DC-4X4	16	No	No	No	No	No	No	Yes	No	4	0	No	No	No	No	Yes	Unreleased, canceled

== HDHomeRun PRIME ==
Introduced in late 2011, the HDHomeRun PRIME provided the ability to view and record all digital cable channels the user subscribed to without using a cable-supplied set-top box. The device employed a CableCARD to replace the set-top box. The HDHomeRun PRIME could be integrated with Windows Media Center. With 3 tuners, the PRIME let you record two programs and watch another program live simultaneously. Due to a change in FCC regulation (cable service providers no longer have to make CableCARDs available to their customers), they are no longer in production.

== HDHomeRun Premium TV ==
Launched in 2018, HDHomeRun Premium TV was a virtual MVPD service that worked with the HDHomeRun PRIME and HDHomeRun DVR service. A notable feature of this service was the ability to record the channel streams to a local hard drive for time-shifted viewing. In March 2019, HDHomeRun announced that it would shut down its Premium service.

== See also ==
- Monsoon HAVA
- Dreambox
- DBox2
- Slingbox
- LocationFree Player
