= Mobile music =

Music distributed and played via mobile phones

Mobile music is music which can be transported, or in other words, mobile. The term itself is a quite ambiguous.

An outdated definition is as follows; 'mobile music is music which is downloaded or streamed to mobile phones and played by mobile phones. Although many phones play music as ringtones, true "music phones" generally allow users to stream music or download music files over the internet via a WiFi connection or 3G cell phone connection. Music phones are also able to import audio files from their PCs. The case of mobile music being stored within the memory of the mobile phone is the case similar to traditional business models in the music industry. It supports two variants: the user can either purchase the music for outright ownership or access entire libraries of music via a subscription model. In this case the music files are available as long as the subscription is active.'

== Truetones ==
While ringtones do not include artists voices, truetones, chaku-uta and chaku-uta full are recordings of artists' interpretation of music. Distributing them usually requires the agreement of record labels and other owners of artists' rights.

== History ==
Mobile music is technically any form of music which can be moved. This includes musical instruments. This article, however, does not go over the history of musical instruments, as there are already articles on such.

=== Physical hardware ===
==== Radios ====
Radios is one of the earliest forms of technology based mobile music.

==== Cassette tape players ====
The most prominent and iconic piece of mobile music is Sony's Walkman. Another term for it is a mobile cassette tape player, a product which multiple companies created.

==== CD players ====
The mobile CD player, such as Sony's Discman, is another innovation in the realm of mobile music.

==== MP3 players ====
The MP3 is step towards a truly digital age of music.

==== Mobile phones ====
The integration of music in a cellphone was not easy. On one hand, technology for portable music had been developed since the 1980s with Sony driving the area with its portable walkman. On the other, cellphone technology had focused on the area of imaging, leveraging the user interest in taking pictures and the operator's need to drive data revenues through the use of its network. The success of ringtones in driving data revenues had placed operators on guard for interactive applications that could drive revenues. Nevertheless, slow data speeds in the GSM and CDMA areas which had 1 and 2G technology, prevented the economic download of music data through networks in comparison with media sites to a computer. So operators, which tended to subsidize phones with data capabilities focused more on ringtone, SMS, and picture phones than on music ready phones, and this prevented many manufacturers to develop those phones because their primary customer is the operator and not the user. Work on compression algorithms for music was extensive with AMR trying to push the envelope, but the revolution of Napster proliferated the world with the MP3 format and manufacturers began to take notice. Another issue was the development of DRM capabilities which helped prevent music piracy and gave mobile music more of a legal status. At that time, Apple was revolutionizing the world with the introduction of the new iPods and its iTunes Store.

The first report on a business plan and need for the successful integration of Music Phones was written in 2004 by Strategy Analytics - "Music phones are key for 3G", a cellular consulting firm in Massachusetts. The report boosted the need for phone manufacturers like Nokia and Motorola to join the bandwagon and explore several music options including the development of a music store strategy by Nokia and the integration of iTunes into a phone by Motorola with its Rocker. Sony, Samsung, and LG were too busy focusing on increasing pixelation and stability within CDDMA camera modules. Sony tried to leverage the Cybershot technology in a multimedia strategy, but it was too slow of a change. While Samsung was driving the high tier segment improving display capability. Nokia worked hard to drive DRM technology to be included into its OVI music store and introduced a new music phone line called Xpress music banking on end user needs rather than on operator's wants because the line was expected to receive lower subsidies from operators than others. In this way, Nokia was banking on the Idea of the report that music could be used to drive customer acquisition at that time rather than data revenues for the time, as mentioned in the report from Strategy Analytics. The Rocker was a success driving new adherents into a highly competitive US market even though it still remained tied to a computer for music downloads. It could be said that it was the adoption of the Rocker by ATT as an acquisition strategy for the US market that prompted operators to purchase music capable phones and manufacturers to develop them. This success of ATT to drive acquisitions was copied by other operators such as Verizon, Sprint, and T-Mobile, which also drove the introduction of music into the cellphones. Two years after the Rocker, Apple introduced its iPhone and things went on its way. Today, most cell phones incorporate music capabilities which have also been transferred to the smartphones. The built-in app that you use to play music on the iPhone or iPod touch is called Music (on iOS 5 or higher) or iPod (on iOS 4 or lower). While many apps offer music, this is the most common and the one that, for many people, will be the only music app they need.

==== iPod/Zune ====
The iPod and Zune are two similar pieces of technology.

==== Smartphones ====
Smartphone is the most revolutionary piece of technology to date in regards for mobile music, allowing access to nearly every artist at the click of a button.

=== Software ===
==== Napster ====
Napster laid the groundwork for the coming wave of streaming audio services.

==== Music streaming ====
Music streaming became prominent in the 2000s. Few Prominent Music Streaming Platforms

- Gaana
- Spotify
- Wynk Music
- JioSaavn
- Didiom

== Social issues ==
=== Pirating ===
Pirating is another issue artists face. Napster was the first large scale system for such, laying grounds for streaming.

=== Lack of income for artists ===
The introduction of streaming has caused artists to be unable to support themselves through their music and its sales alone. The pandemic made people quickly aware of this issue.

== Social impact ==
Mobile music has become prominent in daily life to the point where studies have been done over such.

== See also ==
- Musical instrument
- Ringtone
