= Here One =

Here One Wireless Smart Earbuds
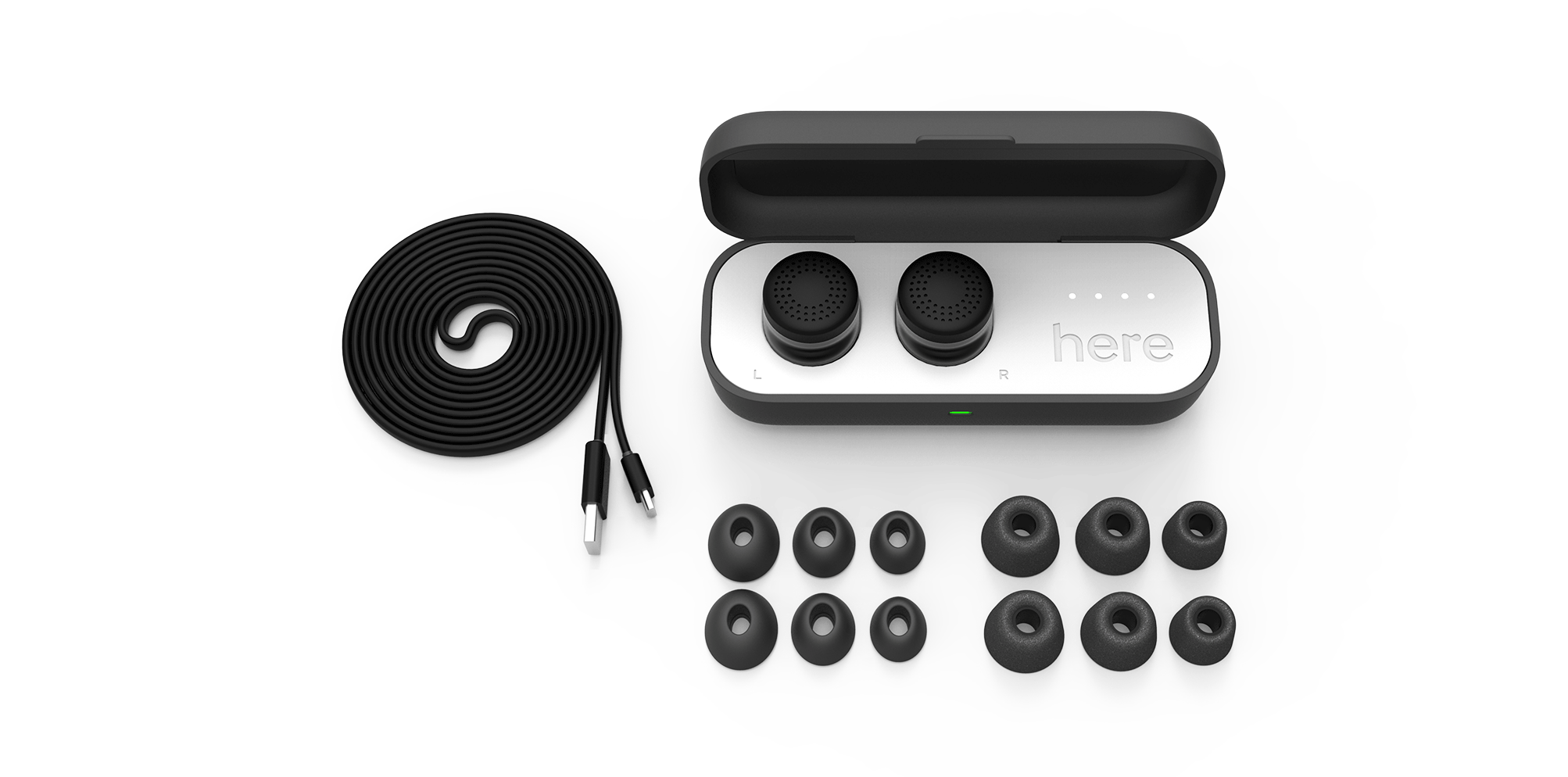
- Developer: Doppler Labs
- Type: Wireless earbuds
- Released: February 21, 2017; 9 years ago
- Website: hereplus.me

Here One is a pair of wireless smart earbuds developed and manufactured by Doppler Labs. It allows users to filter sound, stream music, and amplify speech. It can also be used to take phone calls and filter certain sounds, such as background noise. Here One has been called the world's first in-ear computer and in June 2018 Here One was inducted into the Smithsonian Institution's Cooper Hewitt Museum of Design for innovation in audio technology.

== Background ==
Here One was built on the hardware and software foundation of its predecessor Here Active Listening, which was originally launched on Kickstarter, but Here One added streaming capability and allowed users to stream music and take phone calls in addition to the real-world sound control found in Here Active Listening. Doppler Labs showcased Here One to fans and performing artists through a collaborative integration at the 2016 Coachella Music Festival. The products were offered to ticket holders so they could bring the earbuds to the festival in order to filter sound at Coachella. Doppler Labs also introduced custom filters for the Coachella stages, including Tiesto mode, designed by the DJ and producer, so that wearers could enhance the music at each stage. Demos were also provided backstage to performing artists.

On November 1, 2017, Doppler Labs announced that it was ceasing sales of Here One.

== Design ==
The earbuds are designed to fit comfortably in the ear, with a range of ear tips and wings to ensure a secure fit. They come in sleek, compact charging case that can provide up to two additional charges for the earbuds. The earbuds themselves are small and discreet, with touch controls for adjusting settings and accessing features.

=== Hardware ===
Here One consists of two wireless earbuds, a charging case, and a connected smartphone app. Each earbud contains four integrated circuits, including a digital signal processor, three analogue mems microphones (which provide directional capabilities), and a high-fidelity balanced armature speaker.

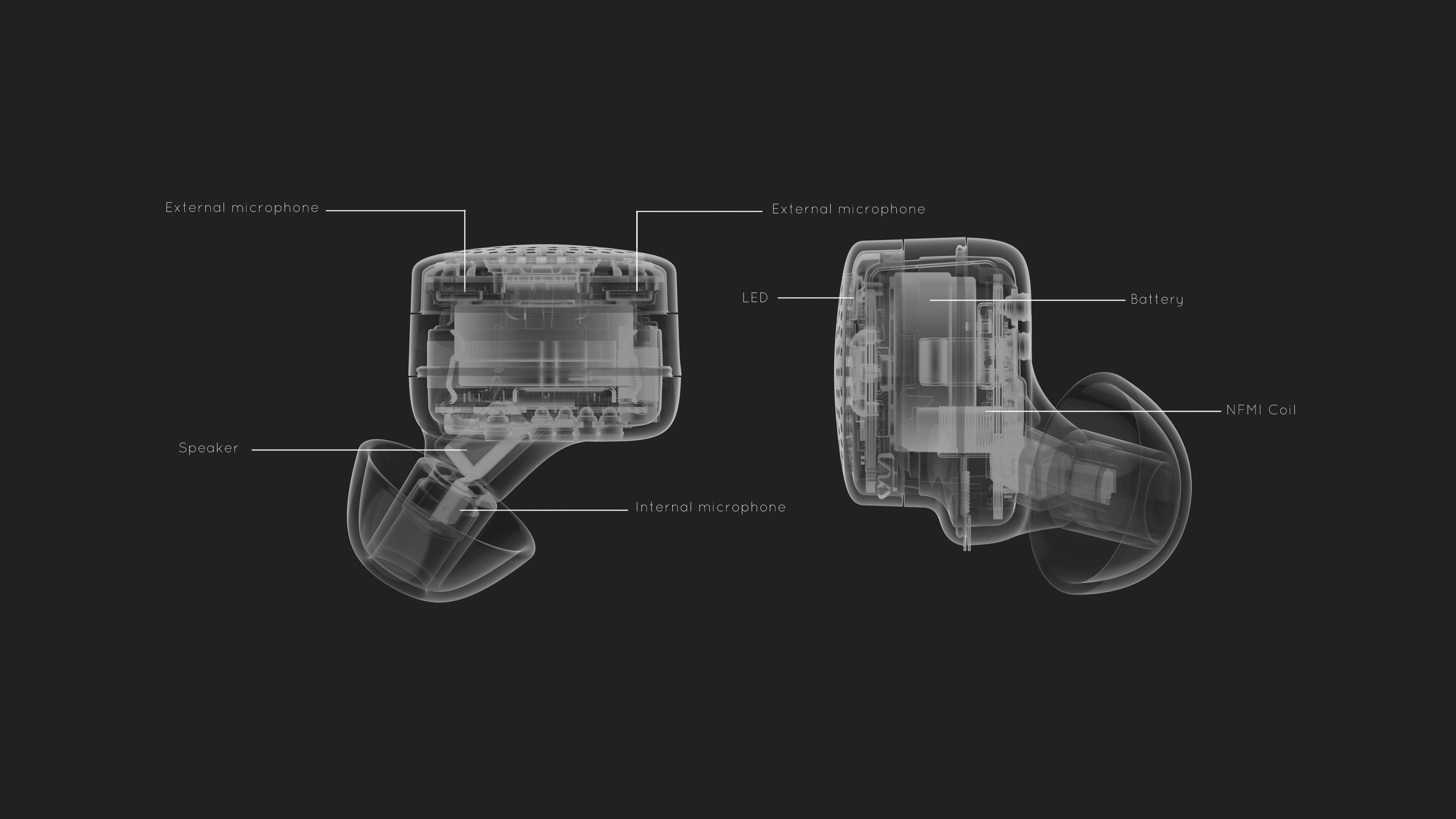
Here One Schematic Doppler Labs

=== Software ===
Here One is powered by the Here One app, a free smartphone application. The Here One app is used to control the settings of Here One. It includes six preset audio filters which allow the users to filter the sounds of specific environments. The Here One app also includes a Live Mix section which includes effects and a live equalizer that lets users adjust specific audio frequencies and add effects like reverb and bass boost to the real-world sound entering their ears.

Here One utilizes advanced machine learning algorithms for its Smart Suggest engine. This backend system uses POI data and environmental cues to tune the Here One buds to their surroundings and provide the best listening experience for the user. This "machine hearing" model was trained by over a million unique binaural samples that Doppler Labs audio engineers collected over the course of two years and is used to continuously improve the Here One software over time.

Here One also offers a Personal Listening Profile, a self-calibrated hearing test that helps the product adjust to the parameters of each individual's hearing needs and preferences.

Here One has been called the world's first in-ear computer by publications including Fast Company for its ability to intelligently control audio and relay information back to the phone and to the cloud. USA Today called Here One "wireless computers designed for the ear" and compared the earbuds to the innovations found in Oculus Rift. The Next Web called Here One "the real future of AR", sharing how in-ear computing provides users the tools to manipulate and personalize audio environments in real-time.

Here One was initially set to be released in November 2016. Doppler Labs delayed their release to February 2017 in order to ensure manufacturing consistency.

=== Applications for hearing health ===
Here One Wireless Smart Earbuds have a range of applications for hearing health, including the ability to enhance speech intelligibility in noisy environments. They can also be used to reduce tinnitus symptoms and provide users with a personalized listening experience that is tailored to their unique hearing profile.

== Reception ==
Here One won the South by Southwest Best of Show Innovation Award and the Award for Innovation in Music at the 2016 SXSW festival.

David Pierce of Wired called the features "magic", praising the ability to control sound in real-time, and named the hands-on control a "superpower" and "one of the most thrilling gadgets". Gizmodo praised comfort, but questioned the battery life. Time magazine claimed Here One provides "supersonic hearing" and praised the nature of Here One's ability to selectively reduce frequency ranges. Inc. discussed why the earbuds do much more than play audio. Reviewing Here One as an augmented reality device, The Verge named the audio "the best you'll find on truly wireless Bluetooth earbuds" and was impressed by the hardware design, calling the sound manipulation technology "robust".
