= DUBS Acoustic Filters =

Ear plugs designed by Doppler Labs

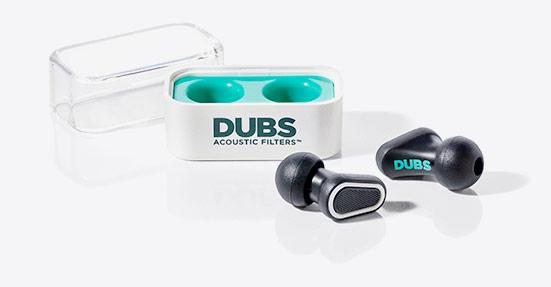
- Developer: Doppler Labs
- Type: Wireless earbuds
- Released: 2014
- Website: Get Dubs

DUBS Acoustic Filters are ear plugs designed by Doppler Labs and were released in 2014. They use a proprietary 17-piece physical acoustic filter system which reduces sound pressure at different frequencies whilst maintaining acoustical fidelity.

== History ==
In 2014, Doppler Labs launched DUBS Acoustic Filters as their first product at the Global Citizen Festival in New York City. In 2015, Doppler Labs announced a partnership with Coachella Music and Arts Festival promoter Goldenvoice to distribute more than 130,000 pairs of DUBS to festival attendees through the official Coachella welcome box.

Doppler Labs brought on a roster of partners and investors from the entertainment and music industries to support DUBS including Hans Zimmer, Quincy Jones, Tiesto, and Mark Ronson, among others.

== Design ==
Doppler Labs designed DUBS Acoustic Filters to accommodate the need for audio fidelity when listening to music. In 2015, DUBS were awarded the Red Dot Award in Product Design for their "organic design" and "sophisticated technology".

== Reception ==
DUBS Acoustic Filters were widely reviewed by media for their ability to protect people's hearing at concerts without sacrificing the fidelity of the music and as suitable accessories for air travel.
