= Thuuz =

- Website type: Sports information
- Registration: Required to receive alerts
- Launched: September 2010; 16 years ago
- Current status: Disabled

Thuuz (derived from the word "enthusiast") was a sports discovery service that alerted users on sporting events via a proprietary excitement rating.

Thuuz was acquired by, and merged with, Stats Perform in 2020.

== Overview ==
Thuuz attempts to create an objective rating for each game by analyzing live feeds of play-by-play statistics, and measuring six different factors: pace, parity, momentum, social media buzz, novelty and context. Proprietary algorithms process this data and rate games on a color-coded 0-100 point excitement scale. The score 0-39 is rated as "dull", 40–64 as "OK", 65–84 as "Good" and 85–100 as "Great" with the color becomes darker red as the score increases. Real-time and archived game ratings are displayed. Thuuz also forecasts the ratings for the upcoming games as well.

Thuuz sends registered fans live alerts by SMS text or email, permitting a user to tune into a game of interest. Fans may personalize the sports and leagues they are interested in, list favorite teams, and the level of excitement at which they wish to receive an alert.

Thuuz has teamed with partners such as Dish Network and Google TV to integrate Thuuz ratings with televised sports, helping interactive TV viewers to discover, watch, and record exciting games.

Post-game ratings provide guidance for fans who have recorded multiple events for time-shifted viewing or who wish to watch televised or online replays. Game results are not displayed, so fans can choose the best games to watch without losing the element of suspense, and avoid wasting time on games that turn out to be dull. Thuuz will also suggest the best point in each game to start watching.

Thuuz also employs its algorithms to offer predictions on which upcoming games are anticipated to be most exciting.

Thuuz generates lists of the games, teams, leagues performances, and players which offer a different perspective than traditional statistics.

== History ==
The Thuuz website was launched in September 2010 to help sports fans solve the problem of information overload by identifying the best content "...like your buddy who calls and tells you there's a great game going on," according to Thuuz CEO Warren Packard.

On 15 September 2011, Thuuz released mobile applications for iOS and Android devices.

Beginning with the 2012 NFL season, Thuuz upgraded its apps to support fantasy sports, alerting fantasy team owners to news, plays and scoring involving their players.

Thuuz raised $4.2 million in Series A capital funding in September 2012. They raised another $6.5 million in funding in June 2017.

By 2013, the company's sole competitor was Are You Watching This?!.

Thuuz became a part of Stats Perform in 2020.

== Coverage ==
=== Professional sports ===
- Baseball
  - Major League Baseball
- Basketball
  - National Basketball Association
- Football
  - National Football League
- Ice hockey
  - National Hockey League
- Cricket
  - Indian Premier League
- Association football
  - Premier League
  - La Liga
  - Bundesliga
  - Serie A
  - Campeonato Brasileiro Série A
  - Ligue 1
  - Eredivisie
  - Liga MX
  - Major League Soccer
  - Copa del Rey
  - EFL Championship
  - Copa Libertadores
  - Süper Lig
  - Primeira Liga
  - First League
  - Scottish Premiership
  - Belgian First Division A
  - US Open Cup
- Tennis
  - ATP Tour (Men's)
  - WTA Tour (Women's)
- Golf
  - PGA Tour (Men's)

=== US college sports ===
- NCAA Basketball (Men's)
- NCAA Football

=== International competitions ===
- Cricket
  - ICC World Cup
  - Indian Premier League
- Rugby
  - Rugby World Cup
  - Heineken Cup
- Soccer
  - UEFA Champions League
  - UEFA European Championship
  - FIFA World Cup (Men's and Women's)
  - CONCACAF Champions League
  - CONCACAF Gold Cup
  - English Football League Cup
