= Doppler Labs =

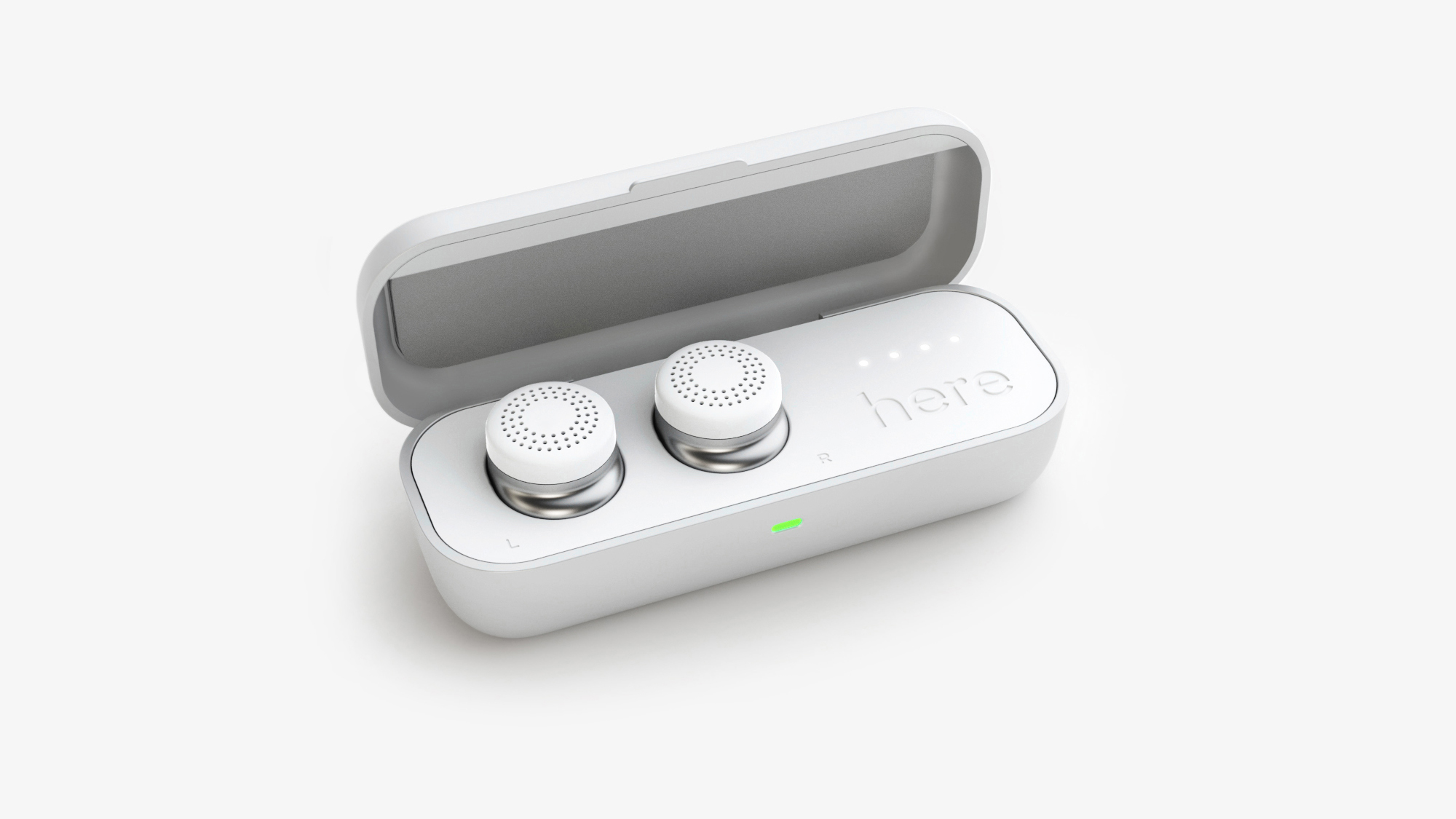
- The Here One earbuds by Doppler Labs charging in their carrying case.
- Type: Private
- Industry: Technology
- Founded: November 2013 in New York City, United States
- Founders: Noah Kraft (CEO) & Fritz Lanman (chairman) & Dan Wiggins (CTO)
- Defunct: December 1, 2017
- Headquarters: San Francisco, United States
- Area served: Worldwide
- Number of employees: 75
- Website: hereplus.me

Doppler Labs was a San Francisco-based audio technology company, founded in 2013. The company designed and manufactured in-ear computing technology, including earplugs and Wireless smart earbuds.

== History ==
Doppler Labs was co-founded by Noah Kraft, Fritz Lanman and Dan Wiggins. Kraft had previously worked in the entertainment industry, and was employed as a strategic consultant for Google working for John Hanke on a mobile game called Ingress. Kraft also worked for Lyor Cohen during the founding of 300 Entertainment. Lanman was an executive at Microsoft and a prominent angel investor.

Before voice assistants or true wireless technology were prevalent, Doppler Labs envisioned that computing would move onto the body and into the ear and that voice would become a more primary interface for how humans interact with technology. With Apple's removal of the headphone jack, the launch of the AirPods, and the prevalence of Alexa, the smart earbud category that Doppler helped create was expected to become a $40 billion industry by 2020.

In July 2015, Doppler raised $17 million in series B funding bringing the company's total funding to over $50 million. The round was led by The Chernin Group, Wildcat Capital Management, and Acequia Capital and included luminary investors like Henry Kravis, David Geffen, Blake Krikorian, Dan Gilbert, David Bonderman and Barry Sternlicht.

Doppler Labs first product was DUBS Acoustic Filters, high-tech ear plugs designed that used a proprietary 17-piece physical acoustic filter system to reduce the sound pressure at different frequencies while maintaining acoustical fidelity. In July 2016, Doppler Labs Labs launched Here Active Listening at the Coachella Valley Music and Arts Festival and in 2017 launched its flagship product Here One, a pair of wireless smart earbuds that allowed users to selectively filter ambient sound, stream music, and amplify speech. It could also be used to take phone calls and selectively filter certain sounds, such as background noise. Here One was called the world's first in-ear computer.

In March 2017, Doppler Labs sued Bose for trademark infringement of their Here Buds trademark.

The company supported the Over-the-Counter Hearing Aid Act of 2017 (OTC Hearing Aid Act).

On November 1, 2017, Doppler Labs announced that the company would be winding down operations, and officially closed on December 1. The company cited problems raising additional Series C funding as the reason for the company shutting down. Wired wrote that the company unsuccessfully explored options to stay afloat including partnership, investment, and acquisition from companies such as Microsoft, Apple, Google, Amazon, and Facebook. It was preparing to launch its next product, Here Two, in 2018.

In 2018 Dolby bought most of the remaining IP assets of Doppler Labs, under the direction of Kraft for Doppler; Dan Wiggins was working at Dolby at the time and assisted Dolby in choosing IP and individuals to bring into the Dolby organization. As of May 14, 2024 Wiggins acquired the trademark for Doppler Labs.

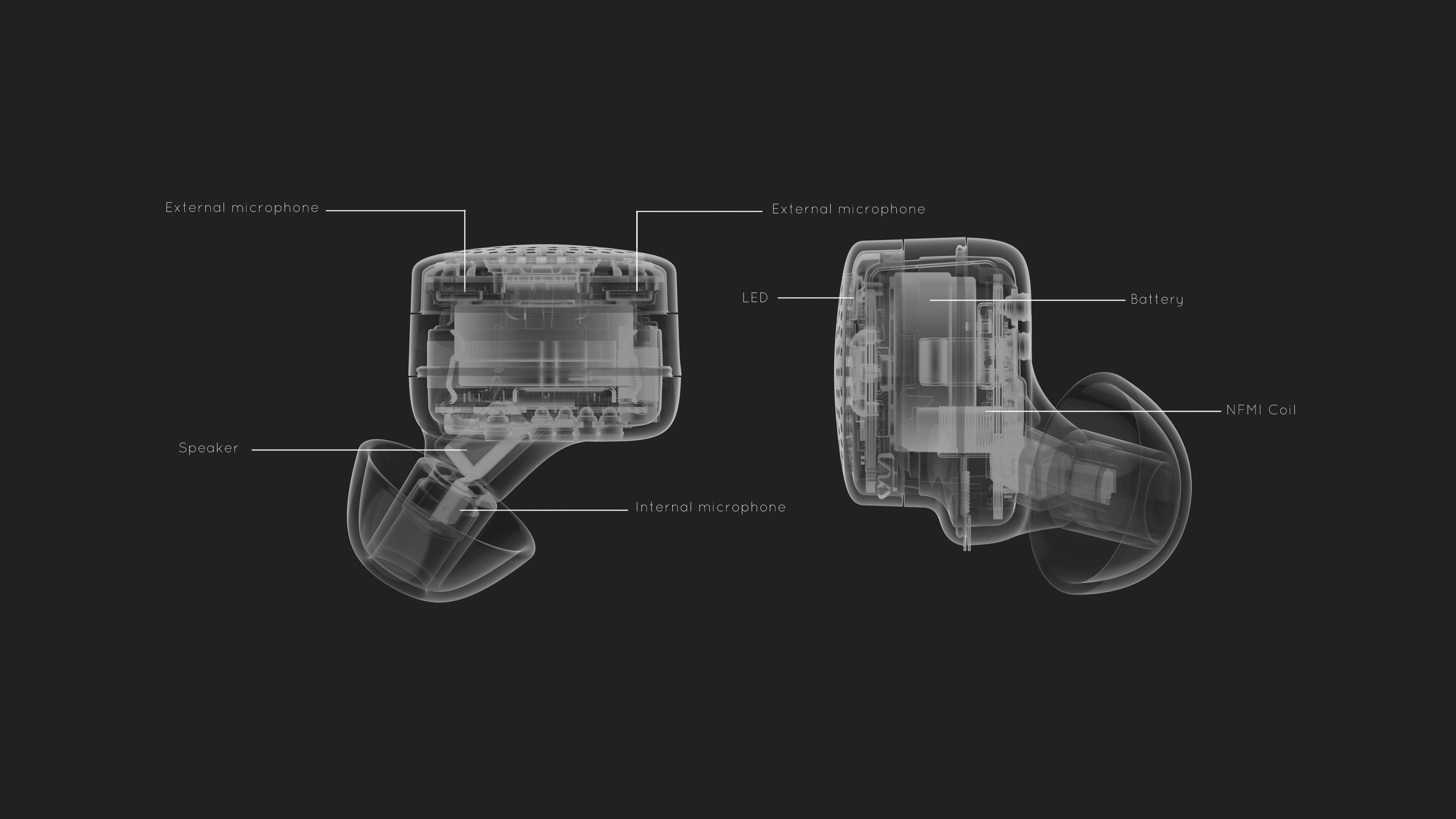
Here One Schematic Doppler Labs

== Partners ==
In addition to its pre-existing partnerships with the Tao Group, Coachella, Bonnaroo and Outside Lands, in November 2016, Doppler Labs announced seven new partnerships with The New York Philharmonic, the Cleveland Cavaliers, the Fine Arts Museums of San Francisco, JetBlue, Gimlet Media, MADE Fashion and The New York Mets to bring Here One technology to sporting events, museums, concert halls, and other live environments.

In December 2016, they also partnered with the Global Citizen Festival to launch #HereTogether, a movement aimed at bringing greater global awareness around efforts to prevent hearing loss and to promote innovation in hearing accessibility. As part of this initiative, Doppler Labs announced its Hearing Bill of Rights in April 2017.

== Awards and recognition ==
- Inc. magazine's Game Changing Inventions of 2015
- Time magazine's Best Inventions of 2015
- Fast Company magazine's World's Most Innovative Companies in 2016
- SXSW's Best of Show in 2016
- Cannes Lions International Festival of Creativity Gold for Product Design in 2016
- Named among Forbes magazine's Next Billion-Dollar Startups list of 2016
- TechCrunch Crunchies Hardware of the Year Runner-Up Award in 2017
