= Thync =

Thync was a startup funded by Khosla Ventures, selling an electronic wearable device it claimed would improve mood. Its makers claim the device works by neurostimulation techniques such as TENS and tDCS.

Some trial users feel no effect while others claim benefits.

One evaluator compared it to drinking an espresso accompanied by a tingle of prickly heat behind the ear.

The Food and Drug Administration declined to classify it as a medical device under their purview.
