= Format shifting =

Conversion of media files into other format

Format shifting is the conversion of media files into different file format or data compression (video coding format and audio coding format). This may be required to play the media on different devices, for example when converting or ripping audio files on CDs into digital formats such as MP3. Other media shifting processes include time shifting (also known as place shifting), a process whereby a radio or television broadcast is recorded to disk storage and played back at a different time, and space shifting where media is stored on one device and can be accessed from another place through another device which is normally located at another location.

== Archiving and preservation ==
Format shifting is central to preservation and archiving, particularly for sound recordings and films. In addition to efforts to preserve works created in deteriorating formats format shifting is also necessary to keep works accessible. As technology develops the technical formats get outdated and the technology necessary for accessing original formats is no longer available. Copyright law of the United Kingdom does not allow libraries and archives to format shift for preservation and archiving purposes. By the time copyright term in a work ends the original work may have disintegrated or deteriorated to such an extent that the cost of preservation increases.

== See also ==
- Media server (Consumer)
- Space shifting (also known as place shifting)
- Time shifting
- Copyright
- Private copying
