= Whole-home DVR =

Type of DVR (digital video recording )

Whole home DVR is a system where there is only 1 physical DVR in the house, but the remaining set top boxes can act like a DVR.

A multi-DVR system where all DVR's are networked together, and can stream recordings to and from each other, would also be a whole-home DVR solution.
