= Bill Gurley =

American venture capitalist (born 1966)

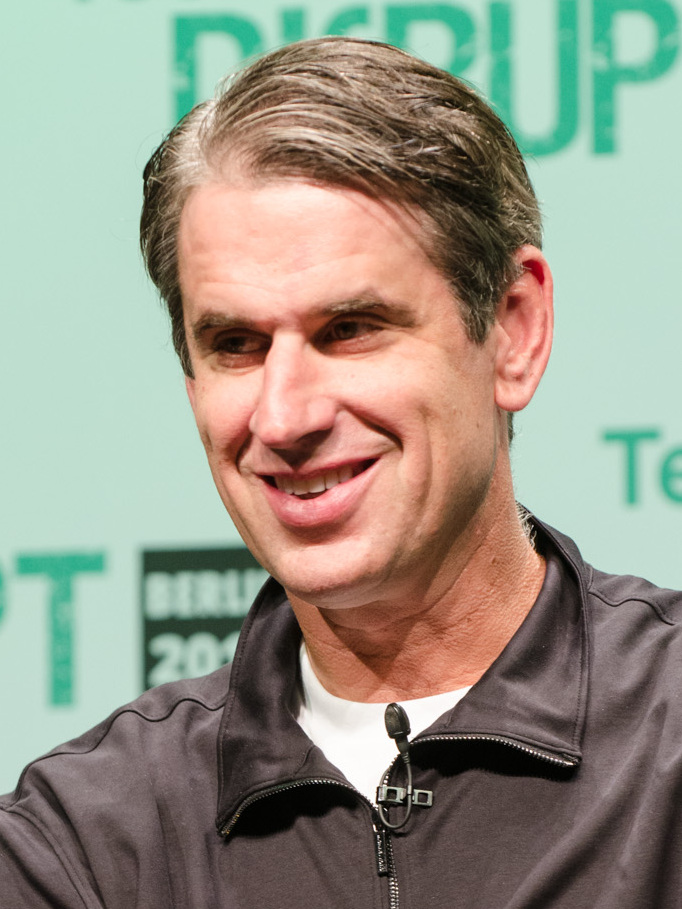
- Gurley in 2013
- Born: John William Gurley; May 10, 1966 (age 60); Dickinson, Texas, U.S.
- Education: University of Florida (BS); University of Texas (MBA)
- Known for: Investing, general partner at Benchmark

John William Gurley (born May 10, 1966) is an American venture capitalist. Since 1999, he has been a general partner at Benchmark, a Silicon Valley venture capital firm in San Francisco, California. He is best known for an early investment in Uber in 2011.

== Early life and education ==
John William Gurley was born in Dickinson, Texas, outside of Houston, on May 10, 1966. Gurley graduated from the University of Florida in 1989 with a Bachelor of Science degree. While at the University of Florida, he was a member of the men’s basketball team. Gurley received his Masters of Business Administration degree from the University of Texas McCombs School of Business in 1993.

== Career ==
Prior to his investment career, Gurley was a design engineer at Compaq Computer, where he worked on products such as the 486/50 and Compaq's first multi-processor server. Before Compaq, he worked in the technical marketing group of AMD's embedded processor division.

Gurley was a partner at Hummer Winblad Venture Partners. He spent four years on Wall Street as a research analyst, including three years at CS First Boston. Author Jeffrey Pfeffer called him “one of Wall Street’s premier technology analysts." He covered companies including Dell, Compaq and Microsoft and was the lead analyst on the Amazon.com IPO.

=== Benchmark ===
At Benchmark, Gurley has led investments in and holds (or held) board seats on Brighter, DogVacay, Good Eggs, GrubHub, HackerOne, Linden Lab, LiveOps, Nextdoor, OpenTable, Sailthru, Scale Computing, Stitch Fix, Vessel, and Zillow.

Other investments of his have included: Avamar Technologies (acquired by EMC Corporation), Business.com (acquired by R.H. Donnelley), Clicker.com (acquired by CBS Interactive), Demandforce (acquired by Intuit), Employease (acquired by ADP, Inc.), JAMDAT Mobile (acquired by Electronic Arts), Nordstrom.com (acquired by Nordstrom), Shopping.com (acquired by eBay), The Knot, Uber, and Vudu (acquired by Walmart). He is listed consistently on the Forbes Midas List.

In 2020, Gurley stepped back from his position at Benchmark, having served with the firm for twenty-one years.

== Views ==
=== 2008 financial crisis ===
With the economic collapse in the fall of 2008, Gurley garnered attention when he sent a letter to his portfolio companies, advising CEOs to exercise caution in spending but to look for and take advantage of opportunities that become available during harsh economic times. In a 2015 interview Gurley said of private tech investing, "it’s my belief that Silicon Valley and the venture-backed businesses have moved into a world that is both speculative and unsustainable." Gurley’s warnings, and posts on his personal blog, Above the Crowd on venture capital spending, have been widely discussed in the industry.

=== Investment banking ===
Gurley has been a proponent of direct listings, an alternative to a traditional initial public offering as a method for going public. He argues that the costs of going public in the U.S. with a traditional IPO are too high, especially for venture capital-backed tech companies. The problem, in his view, is that investment banks on average set an offer price that is lower than what investors are willing to pay, resulting in the company needing to sell more shares to raise a given amount of cash. This additional share issuance dilutes the value of the shares held by the pre-issue shareholders, including company founders and employees. With a direct listing, a company issues a prospectus and the stock starts trading at a price that is determined by supply and demand.

== Personal life ==
Gurley is known for his above-average height; he is 6 ft 9 in (2.06 m). The title of his blog, Above the Crowd, and the book eBoys: The First Inside Account of Venture Capitalists that profiles the Benchmark team, both reference his height; the subtitle of eBoys is “The true story of the six tall men who backed eBay, Webvan, and other billion-dollar start-ups."

A fictionalized version of Gurley portrayed by actor Kyle Chandler appeared in the Showtime drama series Super Pumped.

In 2026, Gurley released Runnin' Down a Dream: How to Thrive in a Career You Actually Love with Crown Currency.

Gurley is married with three children and currently lives in Austin, Texas.

== Awards ==
In March 2016, Gurley was named VC of the Year at TechCrunch’s annual Crunchies awards.
