= Didiom =

Peer-to-peer audio place shifting service

DIDIOM
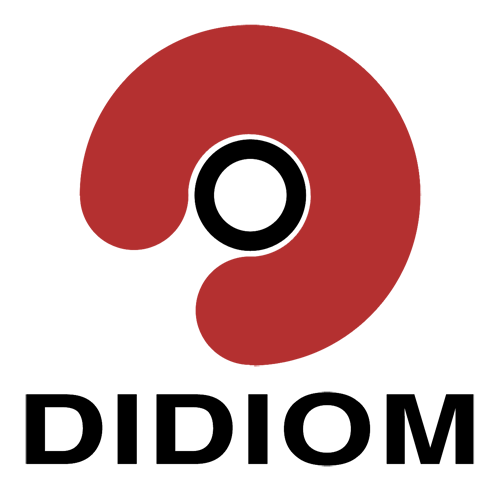
- Type: private company
- Industry: Streaming media, software, music streaming service
- Founded: 2005
- Founder: Ran Assaf
- Headquarters: New York City, US
- Services: streaming media, placeshifting

Didiom was a digital media company focused on developing peer-to-peer audio streaming and mobile music bidding applications. The company's place shifting technology allowed users to stream music from their home computer collections to mobile devices without requiring data cables or memory cards. Didiom also offered a licensed catalog of over two million songs, where users could purchase music or bid for downloads by naming their own price, introducing a novel music purchasing model. In February 2011, Didiom was acquired by Exclaim Mobility, which was later rebranded as SnapOne and subsequently acquired by Synchronoss.

== History ==
Didiom, an acronym for "Digital Distribution of Music," was founded in New York City in 2005 by Ran Assaf, who developed the concept during his graduate studies at Babson College. The company initially created a music download service based on a proprietary adaptive bargaining algorithm that dynamically adjusted prices, allowing users to name their own price for music downloads. The service launched in 2007 on Windows Mobile smartphones, offering a small catalog of independent music.

In October 2008, Didiom launched a public beta of a hybrid mobile service that allowed BlackBerry and Windows Phone users to stream audio from their home computer to their phone over high-speed wireless networks. The service also included access to Didiom's MP3 store, which featured a catalog of over two million songs from independent music distributors, including CD Baby, Finetunes, Phonofile, and eClassical.

In February 2010, Didiom concluded its beta phase, discontinued its name-your-own-price music download service, and introduced Didiom Pro, a subscription-based audio streaming service. Didiom Pro featured redesigned mobile and desktop applications that allowed users to stream audio from their personal computers to devices such as the iPhone, iPod Touch, BlackBerry, and Windows Phones. The service also enabled wireless downloading for offline listening, streaming of Windows Media DRM-protected content, and on-demand shuffling of audio collections.

Didiom partnered with Apple, Microsoft, Samsung, Verizon, and BlackBerry to make the service available on platforms including Apple's App Store, Windows Marketplace for Mobile, Samsung Apps, Verizon's VCast App Store, and BlackBerry World. In February 2011, Didiom was acquired by Princeton-based Exclaim Mobility, a developer of consumer cloud-service applications, which was later rebranded as SnapOne and subsequently acquired by Nasdaq-listed Synchronoss Technologies.

== Technology ==
Didiom developed a peer-to-peer (P2P) audio placeshifting technology that enabled users to stream audio content from personal computers running Microsoft Windows to smartphones without relying on centralized servers. By leveraging users’ computing resources—such as processing power, storage, and network bandwidth—the system reduced the need for centralized infrastructure, providing a cost-effective and scalable solution for media access. This Decentralized Model also offered enhanced privacy by keeping media content on users’ devices rather than transferring it to Didiom's servers.

The desktop application scanned a user's computer for audio files, making them available for secure wireless streaming and downloading via an SSL-encrypted connection through Didiom's mobile application. As long as the user's computer remained connected to the internet, audio files could be accessed remotely from mobile devices.

Didiom's technology supported a range of audio file formats, including DRM-free and DRM-protected Windows Media Audio (WMA), MP3, WAV, Advanced Audio Coding (AAC), M4A, and Ogg Vorbis. It also integrated with playlists from iTunes and Windows Media Player in formats such as WPL, PLS, and M3U. However, DRM-protected AAC files (M4P) from the iTunes Store and audiobooks in the AA format from Audible were not supported.

By distributing workloads across users’ devices, Didiom's P2P-based architecture allowed the system to scale organically, reducing server maintenance requirements and operational costs while offering a flexible and efficient solution for remote audio streaming.

== Awards ==
Didiom received recognition from The One Club and the Academy of Interactive & Visual Arts. In 2010, Red Herring magazine named Didiom among North America's top 200 private technology companies and included it in its global list of the top 200 private technology companies.
