= Are You Watching This?! =

American sports company

- Company type: Private
- Website type: Technology
- Founded: Austin, Texas United States (2006)
- Headquarters: Austin, Texas, {{{location_country}}}
- Founder: Mark Phillip
- Industry: Sports
- Employees: 3
- Website: areyouwatchingthis.com
- Registration: Required to receive alerts
- Current status: Active

Are You Watching This?! (RUWT?!) is an Austin, Texas-based Sports Excitement Analytics company that uses algorithms to identify sporting events that viewers would find exciting or compelling. It was founded by Mark Phillip.

== Overview ==
RUWT?! was founded in 2006, launched publicly in 2007.

The service uses algorithms to analyze live game data and determine if games are exciting.

Despite having a consumer-facing website, the company focuses on licensing excitement data via its API to larger companies.

A patent for a Rating system for identifying exciting sporting events and notifying users was filed by RUWT?! in 2007 and was granted on August 23, 2016. The patent expires on July 17, 2033.
