= Emuzed =

Colorful Emuzed Logo

Emuzed, is now a part of Aricent, the communications software company, previously Flextronics Software Systems spun off from Flextronics International in September 2006.

Emuzed developed and licensed advanced multimedia products and technologies for the embedded multimedia market, principally for OEMs and ODMs. The company headquarters were in San Jose, California with research and development centers in Bangalore and Chennai, India.

The company was founded in 1999 by Prabhat Jain and acquired by Flextronics International Ltd. in 2005. It had more than 260 employees worldwide. Flextronics bought the company in order to be a dominant supplier for the mobile industry and for better market penetration with Emuzed's technologies.

Emuzed provided a full suite of industry standards-based multimedia software and services across a wide range of platforms and operating systems. In addition to customer-ready applications, they also provided customization and turnkey integration services. Its customers include mobile phone maker Nokia, and Panasonic. Emuzed has a reputation for high performance codecs such as those embedded in Symbian smartphones.
