= Schaffer–Vega diversity system =

Wireless guitar system

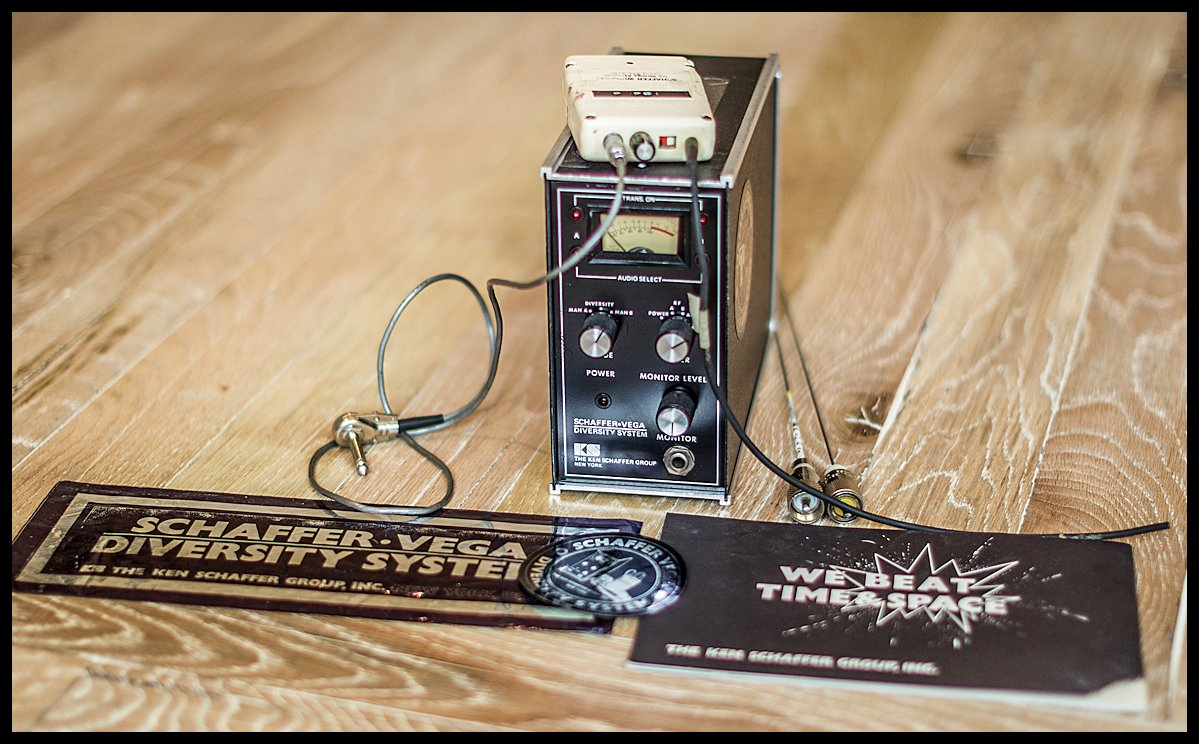
SVDS Model X-10 Transmitter & 63EX Receiver

The Schaffer–Vega diversity system (SVDS) was a wireless guitar system developed in 1975–76, engineered and prototyped by Ken Schaffer in New York City, and manufactured by the Vega Corporation, El Monte, California. A handheld microphone version was introduced in 1977.

The system was the first cordless system to be adopted by major rock acts because it solved technical problems common to earlier wireless systems. The reliable sound and freedom of movement it provided paved the way for bands to tour with large multi-level stages in arenas. Schaffer-Vegas were used in the late 1970s and early 1980s by many rock bands such as Pink Floyd (namely guitarist David Gilmour), the Rolling Stones, AC/DC and Kiss.

== Background ==
Early Advertisement

Traveling with the Rolling Stones on the Tour of The Americas '75, New York-based engineer and radio aficionado Ken Schaffer witnessed the limitations of then-existing wireless systems and sought to develop a better system. The Schaffer-Vega Diversity System (SVDS) combined several new technologies to present a wireless system that was largely immune to the frequent signal fades, interfering signals and limited dynamic range of previous wireless systems. Schaffer gave precedence to developing the first system for wireless guitar (1976) and then the wireless microphone (1977).

After prototyping the wireless system, Schaffer arranged its manufacture by the Vega Corporation, based in El Monte, California. The first bands to use Schaffer-Vega Diversity System were Kiss and Electric Light Orchestra. Though wireless systems afford great mobility on stage, Kiss switched to a wireless system for safety reasons: lead guitarist Ace Frehley had been knocked unconscious by a near-fatal shock traced to a ground fault between his wired guitar connection and a metal staging element. Going wireless with all guitars and microphones eliminated this hazard.

== Technical highlights ==
The Schaffer–Vega diversity system used a space diversity method consisting of two independent VHF receivers fed by antennas placed at least one wavelength apart. Use of two full independent receivers, rather than two parallel antennas, made the Schaffer-Vega the first "True Diversity" system. The diversity technique prevented signal degradation due to multi-path cancellation. In the Schaffer-Vega system, a comparator monitored the instantaneous RF signal strength delivered by each antenna to its dedicated receiver, that switched to the other receiver when the currently selected receiver's signal strength fell below a quieting threshold.

The system achieved high interference rejection by using four helical resonator filters between the antenna and preamplifier stage of each receiver. This made it possible to use the systems on unused VHF television broadcast frequencies and protected the receivers from even strong spurious local signals (such as nearby police calls, taxi dispatch, etc.). Limited by the US FCC to 50 mW output, the Schaffer-Vega Diversity System maintained reliable transmission for up to 100 meters in a line of sight from transmitter to receiver.

In the United States, the FCC and corresponding agencies in most ITU countries, regulations that limit the transmitter's FM frequency deviation also limited the theoretical signal-to-noise ratios and dynamic ranges of wireless systems to approximately 70 dB. The Schaffer-Vega Diversity System also used companding. By compressing signal amplitude 2:1 in the transmitter and then expanding it in the receiver, it was possible for the system to deliver a signal-to-noise ratio and dynamic range of 100 dB.

== Use in the recording studio ==
Although Schaffer's design objective was to create a wireless system that sounded transparent—as close as possible to the wired version—artists, such as Rick Derringer, Eddie Van Halen and Angus Young of AC/DC, chose to use their wireless units in the recording studio. The slight coloration added by the Schaffer-Vega was considered part of the desired guitar tone. In 2015, the audio section of the SVDS was put into production and brought to market as a stand-alone effect by Filippo "SoloDallas" Olivieri and selected for inclusion in Guitar Player Magazine's 2015 Hall of Fame.

== Cessation of production ==
Production ended in 1981, when Schaffer changed his focus to communications satellites. By the time Schaffer moved on, numerous competing systems had become staples in the market.
