= Clicker.com =

Internet video directory and search company

- Owner: CBS Interactive
- Website: www.clicker.com (forwards to www.tv.com)
- Commercial: Yes
- Registration: Optional
- Launched: November 12, 2009
- Current status: Inactive

Clicker was an Internet video directory and search company based in Los Angeles, California. Their website aimed to be the TV Guide for all full episodes of programs available to watch on the Web. It is owned by CBS Interactive.

Clicker indexed only legal video that is streamable online. It did not host any content, instead focusing on helping users discover and navigate to professional content hosted by rights-holders. While much of the streaming video content Clicker indexes was available for free, Clicker also pointed to paid services like Amazon Video-on-Demand, iTunes and Netflix Watch Instantly. Clicker also began indexing Comcast Xfinity, Comcast's online library of TV shows and movies, in August 2010.

In addition to search and directory services, Clicker offered DVR-like features that enabled users to subscribe to shows and track when programs became available online. Additionally, Clicker offered many social features for sharing programming information on Facebook pages and Twitter. In July 2010, Clicker launched Clicker Social, which brought social discovery to the online television guide and let users share what they were watching, follow their friends, recommend shows and movies, and earn awards from content partners like HBO, PBS, Showtime, Crackle, Revision3, Snag Films, NCAA Vault and more.

In April, Clicker launched its iPad Edition. Users who visit the site from their iPad will be automatically redirected to a special version of Clicker that provides a complete programming guide for the iPad, making it easy for iPad users to find what broadcast-quality programming is available to watch and what's not. Clicker also has mobile apps for the iPhone and Android devices which let users check-in to share what they're watching, find programming to watch on their phone, and manage their Playlist.

== History ==
Clicker received an $8 million Series A investment in October 2008 from investors Benchmark Capital and Redpoint Ventures, and an $11 million Series B investment in February 2010 from Jafco Ventures, Benchmark and Redpoint. Board members include Bill Gurley of Benchmark, Geoff Yang of Redpoint, and Slingbox founder Blake Krikorian. Clicker's CEO is Jim Lanzone, former CEO of Ask.com. As part of its Series A round, Clicker also integrated ModernFeed.com, an online video directory.

The company was in stealth mode until it debuted at TechCrunch 50 (September 2009), with the stated goal of becoming the equivalent of TV Guide for the Web. Clicker was runner-up for the Audience Award at the show. The website was in private beta for two months, and then launched publicly two months later at Gigaom's NewTeeVee Live in San Francisco. The Clicker product received a large number of positive critical reviews, including the Wall Street Journal and CNET.

CBS Interactive acquired Clicker in 2011.

As of now, Clicker re-directs to www.tv.com, with no previous Clicker functionality present. Since Clicker has ceased to operate, other services have launched that perform a similar function, such as Movie Monitor.

== Content ==
Clicker's database included more than 750,000 episodes, from over 12,000 broadcast quality shows, from over 2,500 networks, 30,000 movies, and 90,000 music videos from 20,000 artists.

== Partnerships ==
On December 3, 2009, Clicker launched an application on Boxee, which allows users to watch Clicker content from their television. The Clicker app does not include all of the content that currently is available on the website. The app initially included 180,000 episodes from over 3,000 TV and Web shows, as well as 5,000 movies.

== See also ==
- Video On Demand
- Internet Television
- Fancast
- Hulu
- TV.com
- YouTube
- CastTV
