= Time shifting =

Recording media for later playback or viewing

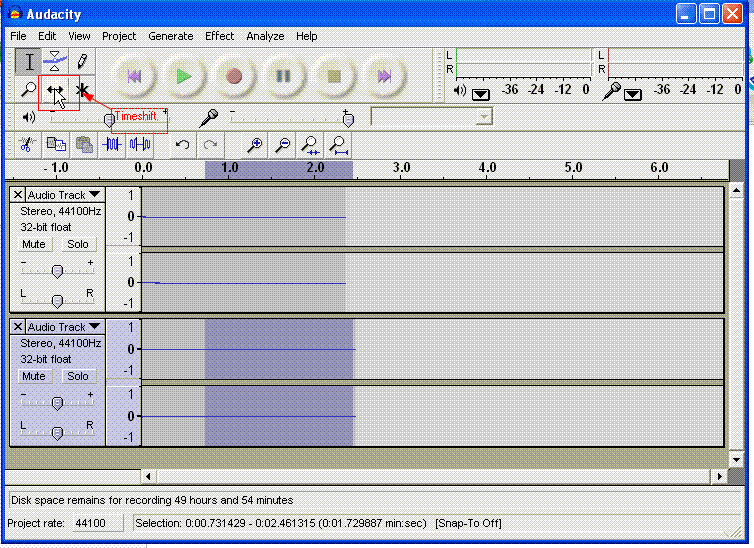

In broadcasting, time shifting is the recording of programming to a storage medium to be viewed or listened to after the live broadcasting. Typically, this refers to TV programming but it can also refer to radio shows via podcasts.

In recent years, the advent of the digital video recorder (DVR) has made time shifting easier, by using an electronic program guide (EPG) and recording shows onto a hard disk. Some DVRs have other possible time-shifting methods, such as being able to start watching the recorded show from the beginning even if the recording is not yet complete. In the past, time shifting was done with a video cassette recorder (VCR) and its timer function, in which the VCR tunes into the appropriate station and records the show onto video tape.

Certain broadcasters transmit timeshifted versions of their channels, usually carrying programming from one hour in the past, to enable those without recording abilities to resolve conflicts and those with recording abilities more flexibility in scheduling conflicting recordings. (See timeshift channel.)

== In the United Kingdom and Ireland ==
Freesat+, Freeview+, Sky+, V+, TiVo, YouView and BT Vision services in Ireland and the UK allow one to timeshift.

== Africa ==
DStv, based in South Africa, offers PVR set-top boxes to countries across Africa which allow time shifting of live and recorded television, using a remote.

== History in the United States ==
The idea of a consumer pausing a live television broadcast was depicted in popular media as early as November 1966 at the end of Season 2, Episode 12 of I Dream of Jeannie, when character Major Nelson asked his genie to pause a live broadcast of a football game so that they could continue to watch it from that point after a grocery shopping trip. With the advent of digital video recorders ReplayTV and TiVo, launched at the 1999 Consumer Electronics Show in Las Vegas, Nevada, it became possible in practice for consumers to purchase devices that supported pausing live television broadcasts and "chase play" (playing back a delayed version of a recorded live stream while simultaneously continuing to record the live stream).

The major legal issue involved in time shifting concerns "fair use" law and the possibility of copyright infringement. This legal issue was first raised in the landmark court case of Sony Corp. of America v. Universal City Studios, Inc. or the "Betamax case". In the 1970s, Universal and Disney sued Sony, claiming its timed recording capability amounted to copyright infringement. The Supreme Court of the United States found in favor of Sony; the majority decision held that time shifting was a fair use, represented no substantial harm to the copyright holder and would not contribute to a diminished marketplace for its product.

RCA mentioned time shifting in its marketing as a reason to buy VCRs, even while an on-screen disclaimer mentioned the Betamax case and cautioned that "Such recordings should not be made". By 1985 cable movie channels encouraged time shifting by broadcasting films subscribers wanted for their home libraries overnight, so their VCRs could record them while they slept. Some providers, such as satellite TV companies, have introduced digital video recorder (DVR) features, thereby allowing consumers to skip over advertising entirely when watching a program which has been recorded to their DVR. The legality of this service, for which an extra fee can be assessed, has been challenged by television broadcasters, who assert that this form of time shifting is a violation of their copyright.

== Analysis ==
A study published in 2019 found that time shifting does not affect the size of the audience for a program which watches it live. Time shifting did, however, increase the size of the overall viewership of a program.

== See also ==
- Timeshift channel
  - Effects of time zones on North American broadcasting
- Space shifting (also known as place shifting)
- Format shifting
- Personal video recorder
