= Slingbox =

Discontinued streaming media device

- Industry: Streaming media
- Founder: Blake Krikorian; Jason Krikorian; Bhupen Shah
- Fate: Discontinued
- Parent: Sling Media

The Slingbox was a TV streaming media device made by Sling Media that encoded local video for transmission over the Internet to a remote device (sometimes called placeshifting). It allowed users to remotely view and control their cable, satellite, or digital video recorder (DVR) system at home from a remote Internet-connected personal computer, smartphone, or tablet as if they were at home.

On November 9, 2020, Sling Media announced that all Slingboxes had been discontinued, and that the Slingbox servers would close on November 9, 2022, making all devices "inoperable".

Upon discontinuing services, an open source project Slinger was started to continue use of the hardware.

== History ==
The Slingbox was first developed in 2002 by two Californian brothers, Blake and Jason Krikorian, who were avid sports fans. They supported the San Francisco Giants, a Major League Baseball team whose games were broadcast regularly by their local TV station. However, when travelling away from their home state, they found they were unable to watch their favorite team because their games were not carried by television stations in other parts of the United States and could not be found for free online. The first edition of the Slingbox came to market in late 2005.

== Technology ==
=== Hardware ===
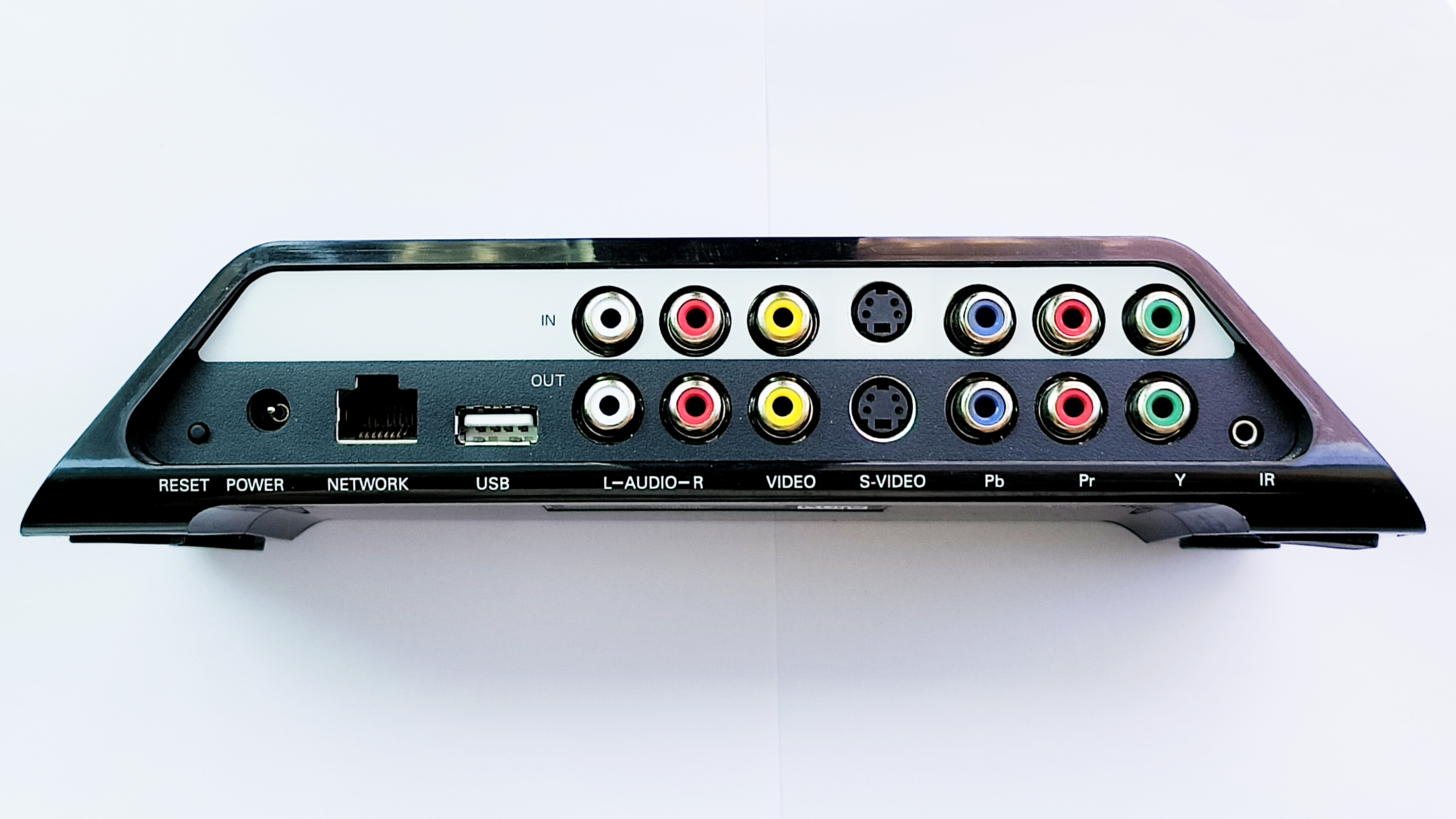
Rear panel of a Slingbox SOLO

The traditional Slingbox embeds a video encoding chip to do real-time encoding of a video and audio stream into the SMPTE 421M / VC-1 format that can be transmitted over the Internet via the ASF streaming format. Later Slingboxes also support Apple's HTTP Live Streaming, which requires support for H.264.

The Slingboxes up until the Fourth Generation (or Next Generation Slingbox) used a Texas Instruments chipset. Current generation Slingboxes and OEM products are built around a ViXS chipset.

Control of the hosting video device, usually a set top box, is done through an IR blaster, which, on older Slingboxes, required the use of an IR blaster dongle. Current generation Slingboxes have built in IR blasters on the box itself, though customers can opt to continue to use the IR blaster dongle.

All Slingboxes include an Ethernet port that connects to a local network and out to the Internet. The Slingbox 500 was the first to include built-in Wi-Fi.

=== Cloud infrastructure ===
Sling used an Amazon Web Services-based infrastructure to support encoding, relaying streams and analytics. It also sourced data from multiple repositories to help guide recommendations to users, including social networks (Facebook and Twitter) and specialty services like Thuuz for sports.

This infrastructure also allowed Sling to report on aggregate television watching behavior. They have released several infographics and provide a Nielsen-like weekly report of the top shows.

== Clients ==
=== Slingplayer for Desktop and the Watch client ===
Viewing content from a Slingbox requires a client application on a PC or mobile device. Sling initially offered a desktop application for Windows and the Macintosh, which was deprecated when the Slingbox Watch website was released. Watch is a NPAPI-based browser plug-in for Microsoft Internet Explorer, Mozilla Firefox, Google Chrome and Apple Safari. This website experience includes the ability to view and control your set top box, an integrated electronic program guide (US/Canada only) and the ability to manage your connected Slingboxes. A registered Sling account is required to access the Watch website. The Dish Anywhere website is based on this technology.

In July 2014, Sling announced the return of the Slingplayer for Desktop application with the launch of the Slingbox M1 and SlingTV.

=== Slingplayer for Mobile ===
In addition to the Watch Slingbox website, customers can purchase a SlingPlayer app for their mobile device. Supported platforms include iOS (iPhone and iPad), Android (phones and tablets), Kindle Fire and Microsoft Windows 8.1 tablets. Previously supported platforms include Blackberry, Palm OS and Symbian. The launch price for SlingPlayer apps was $29.99. The price was reduced to $14.99 when the Slingbox 350 and 500 were launched in October 2012.

Slingplayer Mobile for iPhone was demonstrated at Macworld Expo 2009 in January and became available in May of the same year. On May 12, 2009, the Slingplayer App became available at the Apple App Store, but only for US, Canadian and UK accounts, and was originally restricted to Wi-Fi for streaming content. Sling's promotional email confirmed that the Slingplayer for iPhone works with Wi-Fi connections only "at Apple's request" – a decision believed to have been made at the behest of incumbent iPhone network operators such as AT&T and O2. AT&T later relented to allow the app to stream over its cellular network. This change was made externally by AT&T as the SlingPlayer App already features quality scaling of content based on connection type.

In November 2010, Sling Media announced the release of a Slingplayer Mobile app for the iPad. The iPad-specific app offers a higher resolution stream than on other devices with smaller screens. In November 2013, an update added second screen capabilities.

Historically, Microsoft Windows Mobile and Windows Phone 7 platforms were supported. Sling released a native version for the Windows 8 platform in December 2013. This version supports both Windows RT and Windows x86 for tablets, laptops and hybrids.
