= Lanman (surname) =

Lanman is a surname. Notable people with the surname include:

- Charles Lanman (1819–1895), American librarian and explorer
- Charles J. Lanman (1795–1870), American lawyer and politician
- Charles Rockwell Lanman (1850–1941), American scholar of Sanskrit
- Faith Lanman Gorrell (1881–1966), American home economist and university professor
- Fritz Lanman (born 1981), American entrepreneur and investor
- James Lanman (1767–1841), American lawyer and United States Senator
- James Lanman (musician), American singer-songwriter
- Richard B. Lanman (born 1955), American physician-scientist and historical ecologist
- Sarah Lanman Smith (1802–1836), American missionary, memoirist, and school founder
- William K. Lanman (1904–2001), American aviator and benefactor of Yale University
