= Struever =

Struever is a surname. Notable people with the surname include:

- Martha Hopkins Struever (1931–2017), American Indian art dealer, author
- Nancy Struever (born 1928), American historian
- Stuart Struever (1931–2022), American archaeologist and anthropologist
