= Lanman =

Lanman may refer to:

- Lanman (surname)
- LAN Manager, an obsolete authentication protocol for Microsoft Windows
- Lanman-Wright Hall at Yale, named after William K. Lanman
