= Mind–body =

Mind–body may refer to:

- Mind–body dualism, a philosophical view that the mind and body are distinct and separate
- Mind–body interventions, health and fitness regimens intended to work on both physical and mental levels
- Mind–body problem, a philosophy of mind
- Mindbody Inc., a software company
- Mindbody, a term coined by William H. Poteat to designate the means by which a person encounters the world
- Bodymind, an approach to understand the relationship between the human body and mind where they are seen as a single integrated unit
