= Fritz Lanman =

American entrepreneur (born 1981)

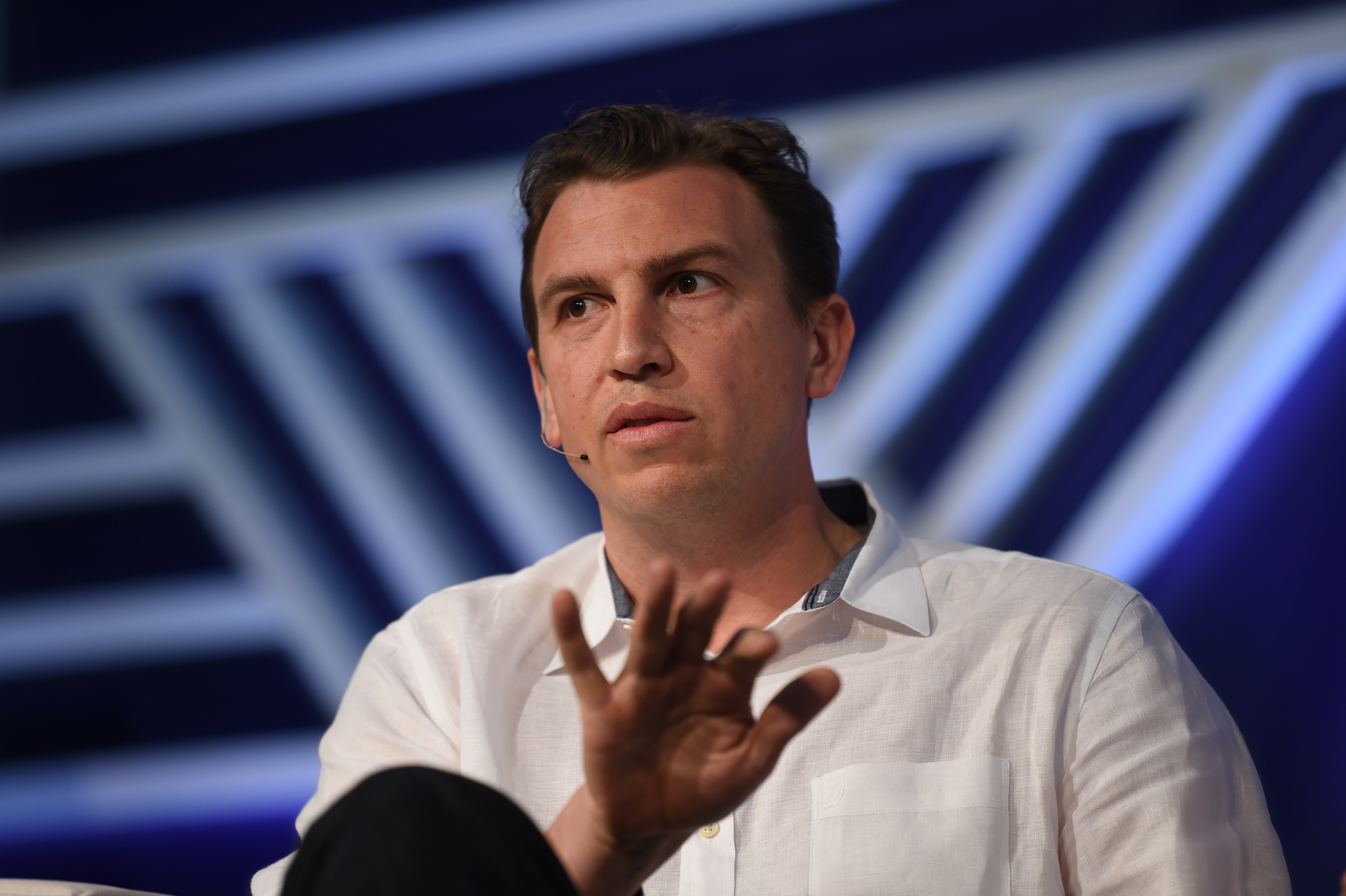
- Lanman in 2018
- Born: Richard Burnham Lanman, III; 1981 (age 44–45); San Francisco, California
- Citizenship: American
- Education: Yale University
- Occupations: Entrepreneur and Investor
- Known for: Playlist.com, Mindbody Inc., ClassPass, Pinterest, Square, Wish, Microsoft, Doppler Labs, Livestar, and Flexport
- Title: CEO of Mindbody Inc.
- Spouse: Melissa Middleton Lanman
- Parent(s): Alanna Purcell Lanman (mother); Dr. Richard Lanman (father)
- Relatives: James Lanman (brother); Max Lanman (brother); Connor Lanman (brother); Christopher Lanman (brother)
- Website: playlist.com

Fritz Lanman (born August 6, 1981) is an American entrepreneur and investor in early-stage technology companies. He led the venture capital financing of ClassPass in 2014 and became CEO in 2017. In 2021, ClassPass was acquired by Mindbody Inc., valuing the former at $1 billion. In August 2022, it was announced that Lanman would take over as CEO of Mindbody. In June 2025, Playlist was created as the parent brand of Mindbody, Booker, and ClassPass with Lanman announced as the CEO.

In addition to his role at ClassPass, he led the initial financings of Pinterest, Square, Wish, and Flexport, as well as the Microsoft deal team decision to invest $240 million in Facebook in 2007, an investment now worth over $8 billion.

== Early life ==
Lanman is the first of five sons of Richard B. Lanman and Alanna Purcell Lanman, born on August 6, 1981. He grew up and attended high school in Los Altos, California. Lanman graduated from Yale University in 2003, following other Lanman Yale graduates beginning with his ancestor United States Senator James Lanman, who graduated from Yale College in 1788.

== Career ==
Fritz Lanman began his career as a product manager at Microsoft. He subsequently became senior director, corporate strategy, where he worked on deals including Microsoft's $240 million Facebook investment. Lanman was quoted onstage at the Le Web conference in 2010 confirming Microsoft's attempt to acquire Facebook, and positing that Facebook (then valued less than $10 billion) would one day be worth as much as Microsoft (then worth $230 billion). As of 2018, Facebook is worth over $500 billion.

Lanman began angel investing in 2010, with his first investment Square, Inc. He and his investment partner Hank Vigil, senior vice president of strategy and partnerships of Microsoft Corp, invested in the seed rounds of notable companies such as Pinterest, Wish, Flexe, EasyPost, inDinero, Cargomatic, Everlane and other startups.

Leaving Microsoft to become an entrepreneur in 2012, Lanman was founder and CEO of Livestar, a personalized recommendations app. Livestar was acquired by Pinterest in 2013.

After co-founding the audio technology company Doppler Labs in 2013, Lanman led the Series A financing for ClassPass and became executive chairman. As of 2016, he was rumored to be running the company alongside founder Payal Kadakia, and in an interview with Vanity Fair, Lanman confirmed that ClassPass intended to expand outside of studio fitness with a live video product and non-fitness product called "LifePass". Both ClassPass and Doppler Labs were listed as "Next Billion Dollar Startups" by Forbes in 2016.

In 2017, ClassPass announced Lanman as CEO, swapping roles with Kadakia who became executive chairman. After Lanman became CEO, Temasek led a $70m Series C financing in the company in June 2017. In early 2018, Lanman launched a new ClassPass product, live-streaming studio fitness workouts as an at-home or at-anywhere interactive live video product.

ClassPass attained unicorn status in a $285 million December 2019 financing round setting the company's valuation at over $1 billion. There are currently over 73,000 venues listed on ClassPass, including boutique studios, gyms and wellness providers, in 31 different countries. ClassPass also launched a corporate program that allows organizations to subsidize their employees using ClassPass.

On October 13, 2021, ClassPass was acquired by Mindbody Inc. in an all stock transaction. On August 2, 2022, it was announced that Fritz would become the CEO of Mindbody Inc effective September 3, 2022.

In June 2025, Playlist was created as the parent brand of Mindbody, Booker, and ClassPass, with Lanman as CEO.

== Awards and recognition ==
In 2015, Fritz Lanman was named "One of the Most Powerful People in Wearables" by Wearables.com as executive chairman for Doppler Labs' "Here Buds" product, "Here". In 2017, Fritz Lanman was named one of Fast Company's "Most Creative People in Business". In 2024, Lanman was named an Athletech "Power Player."

== See also ==
- Jack Dorsey – American entrepreneur (born 1976)
- Noah Kraft
- Jim McKelvey – American billionaire businessman
- Ben Silbermann – American Internet entrepreneur
- Piotr Szulczewski – CEO of Wish.com
