= Tribal art =

Art made by the indigenous tribes

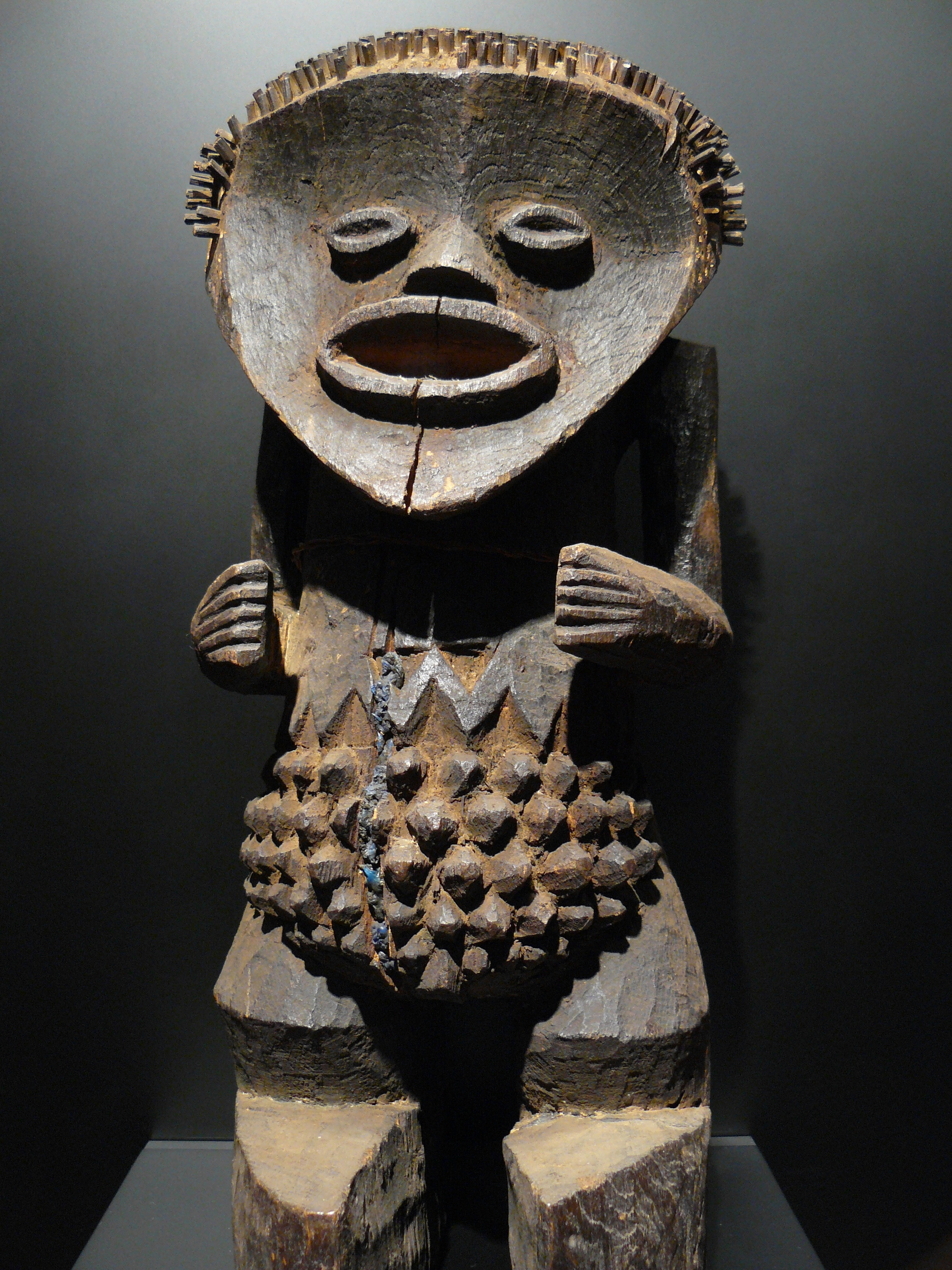
Statuette; 19th-20th century; by Mambila people from Nigeria (Africa); Musée du quai Branly (Paris)

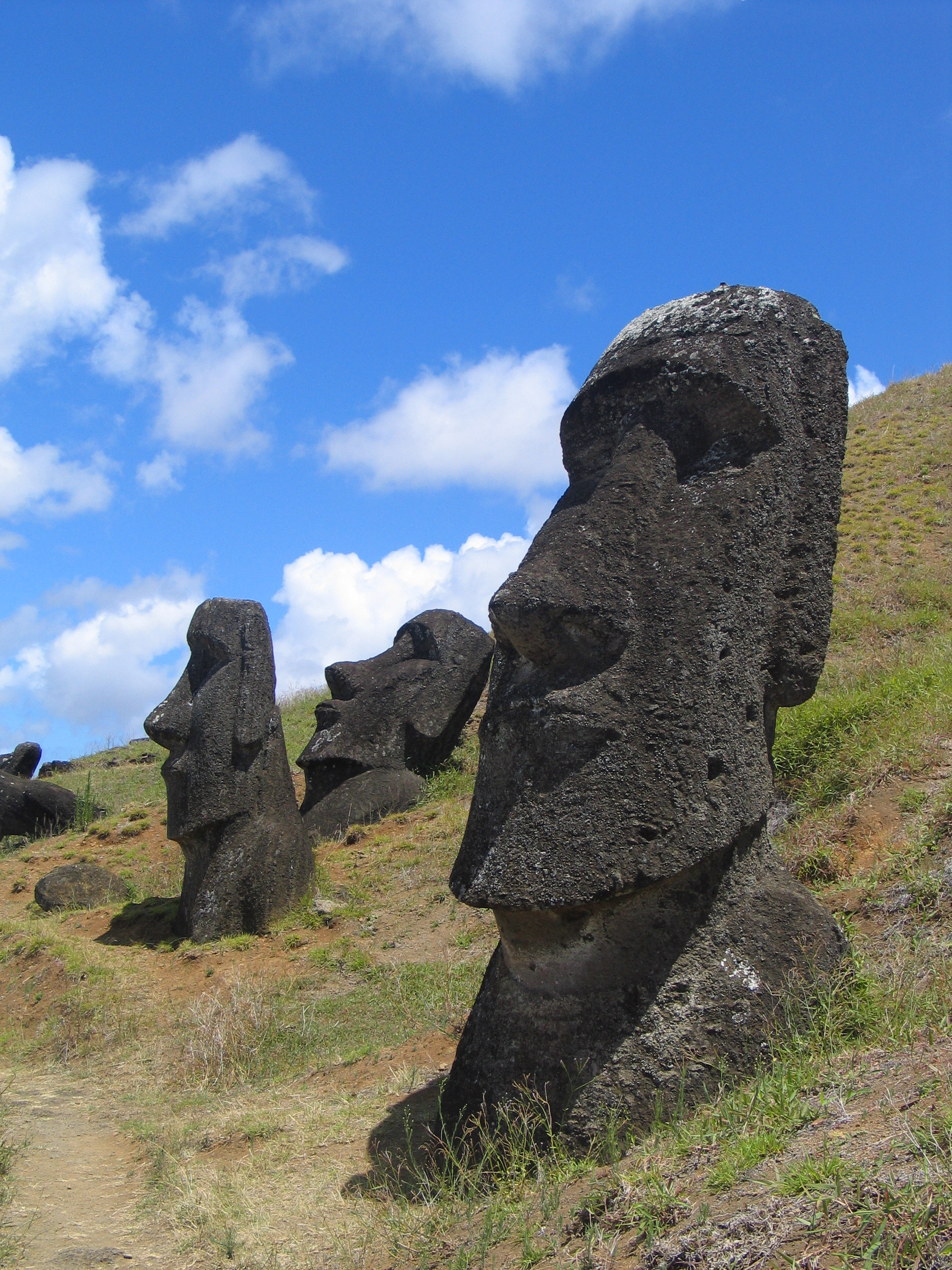
Moais at Rano Raraku (the Easter Island, Oceania), sculpted by Rapa Nui people

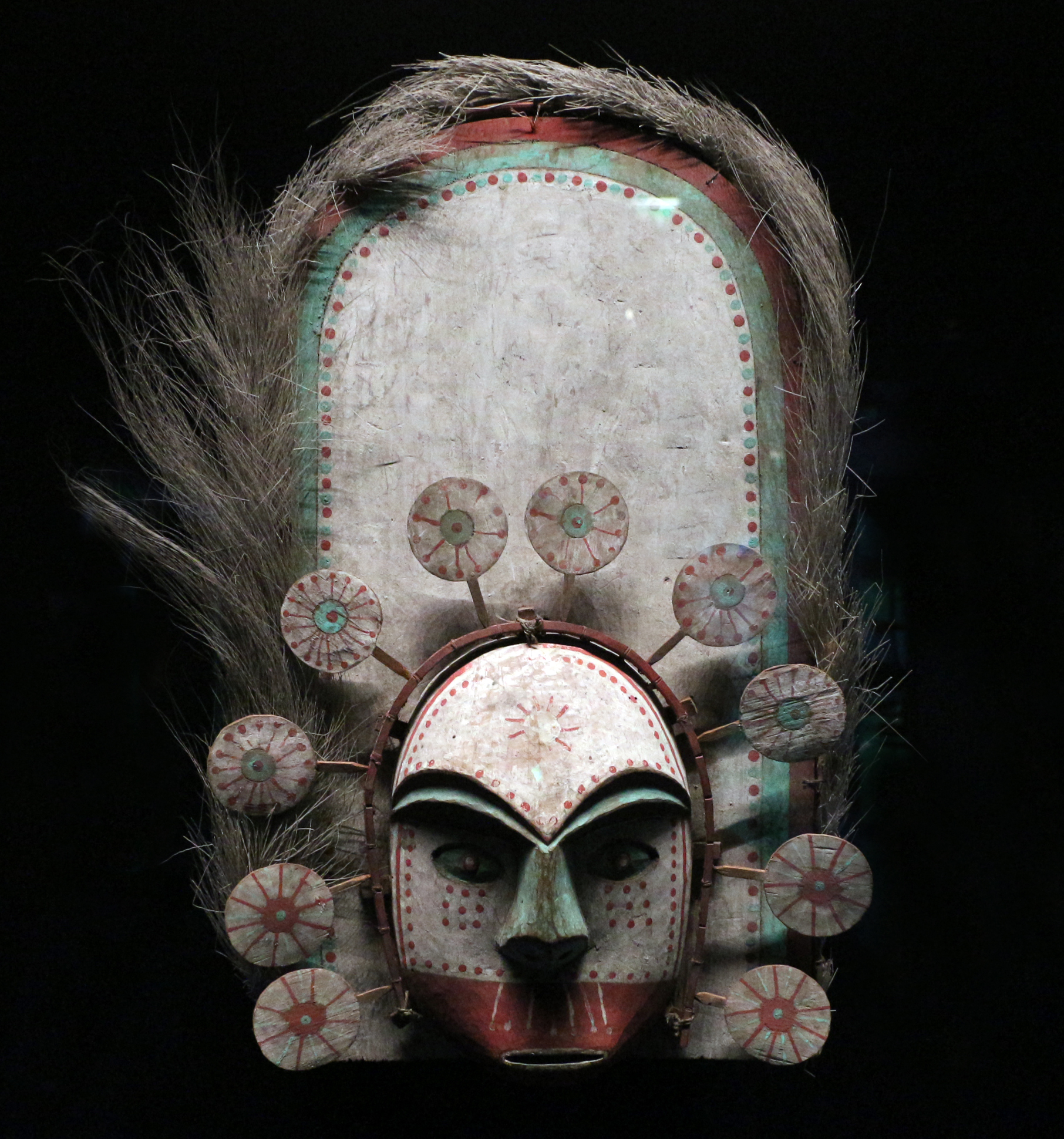
Yupik mask; 19th century; from Alaska; Musée du Quai Branly

Tribal art is the visual arts and material culture of indigenous people. Also known as non-Western art or ethnographic art, or, controversially, primitive art, tribal arts have historically been collected by Western anthropologists, private collectors, and museums, particularly ethnographic and natural history museums.

== Description ==
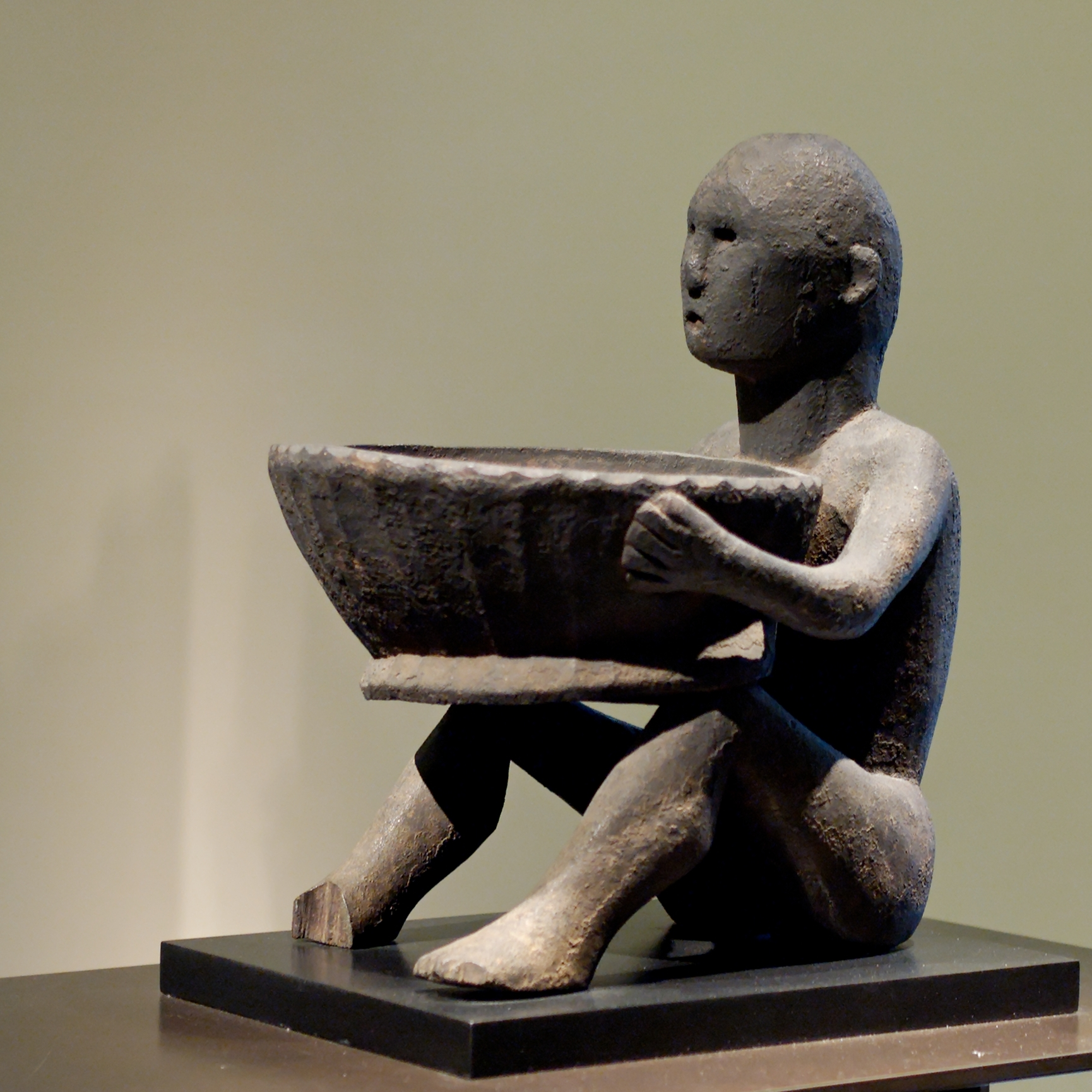
An Anitist bulul (15th century) with a pamahan bowl from northern Philippines. The statue was used as an avatar for one of the many rice deities of the Ifugao.

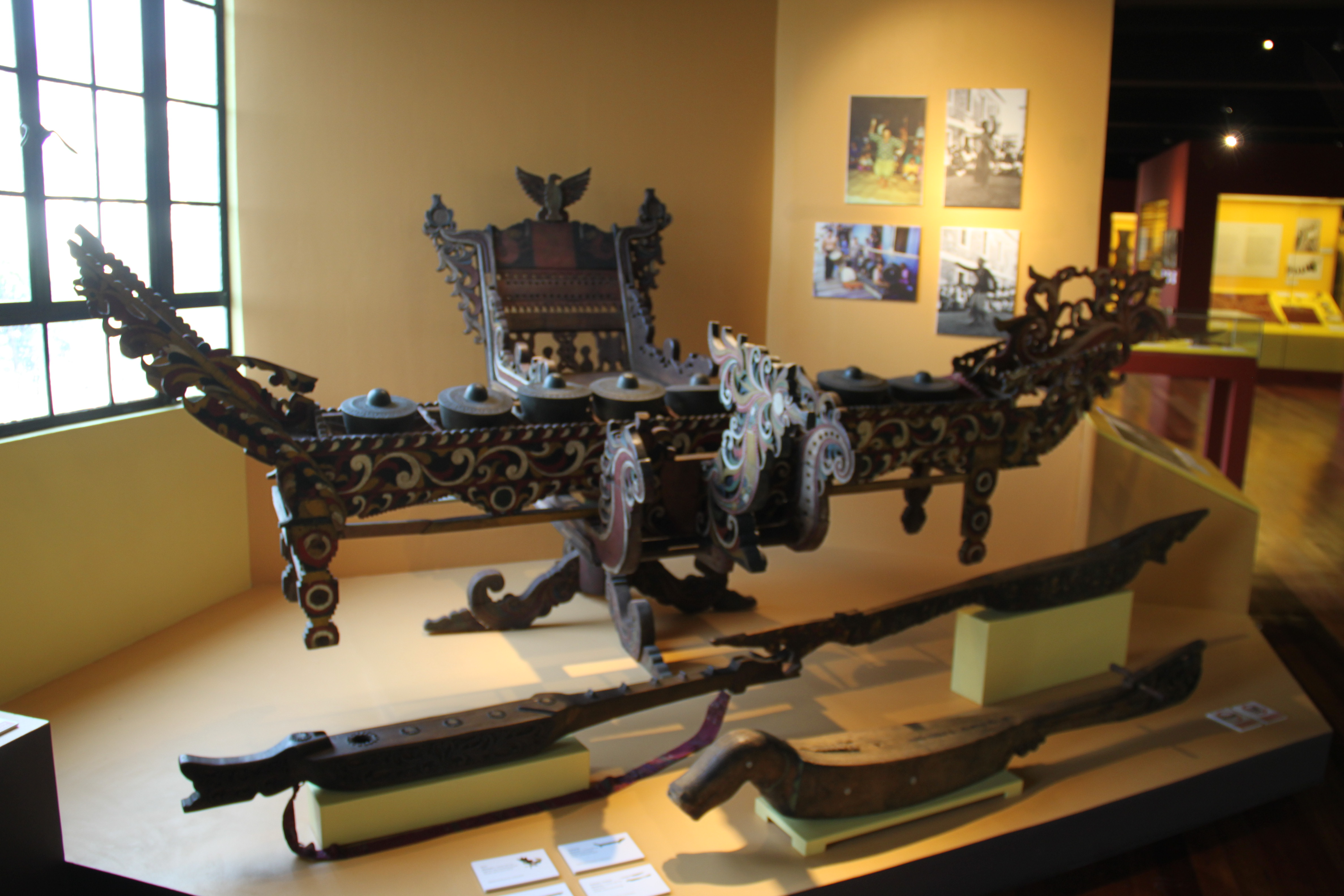
A kulintang crafted by the Maranao people of Lanao. The instrument is used in the chants of indigenous epics.

Tribal art is often ceremonial or religious in nature. Typically originating in rural areas, tribal art refers to the subject and craftsmanship of artifacts from tribal cultures.

In museum collections, tribal art has three primary categories:

- African art, especially arts of Sub-Saharan Africa
- Art of the Americas
- Oceanic art, originating notably from Australia, Melanesia, New Zealand, and Polynesia.

Collection of tribal arts has historically been inspired by the Western myth of the "noble savage", and lack of cultural context has been a challenge with the Western mainstream public's perception of tribal arts. In the 19th century, non-Western art was not seen by mainstream Western art professionals as being art at all. Rather, these objects were seen as artifacts and cultural products of "exotic" or "primitive" cultures, as is still the case with ethnographic collections. The term "primitive" has been criticized as being Eurocentric and pejorative.

In the second half of the 20th century, however, the perception of tribal arts has become less paternalistic, as indigenous and non-indigenous advocates have struggled for more objective scholarship of tribal art. Before Post-Modernism emerged in the 1960s, art critics approached tribal arts from a purely formalist approach, that is, responding only to the visual elements of the work as opposed to the historical and cultural context, symbolism, or the artist's intention. Since then, tribal art such as African art in Western collections has become an important part of international collections, exhibitions and the art market.

== Indian Folk And Tribal Art ==
India is currently separated into states and association regions, which have their own interesting social and conventional characters. Each locale has its style and workmanship known as society craftsmanship. Aside from society craftsmanship, there is a workmanship which was generally polished by the individuals of rustic and innate populaces which is known as the court workmanship. These crafts of India are basic yet charming. They tell about the extravagance of the nation's legacy.

Ancestral craftsmanship depicts the creative vitality showed by the inborn and the provincial. The inborn and people speciality of India incorporates different works of art, for example, artistic creations, makes, crafted works. Some of them are recorded beneath:

Tanjore Art are the artworks from the Thanjavur district of Tamil Nadu. They usually depict tales from Hindu Mythology. Characterized by vivid, vibrant colours, these paintings are known for their gold foil inlays.

Madhubani Painting is otherwise called the Mithila craftsmanship and is a foundation of the area Bihar. It is a line drawing loaded up with brilliant differentiating hues. It is done on naturally put or mud dividers.

Warli Painting originates from the biggest clan on the northern edges of Bombay. Maharashtra is known for its Warli craftsmanship. These works of art are not a portrayal of fanciful characters or gods but rather delineate the public activity of the individuals. The work of art is attracted by spots utilizing ideally white shading. These works of art are holy and marriage couldn't occur without them.

Patachitra or Pattachitra painting, as the name proposes is painting done on canvas. Patta implies canvas and Chitra mean work of art. It is the most established and most well-known type of craftsmanship rose up out of Bengal and Odisha. It is shown by rich vivid application, imaginative themes and plans, and depiction of straightforward subjects, for the most part fanciful in a portrayal.

Rajasthani Miniature Paintings came to India through the Mughals. These artistic creations are made with the most extreme consideration, every single moment detail is dealt with, it has lines, particulars and wonderful splendid hues set in an excellent example. Today, numerous specialists make scaled-down compositions on silk, ivory, cotton, and paper.

Kalamezhuthu is the drawing usually known rangoli, kolam which is drawn at the passage of the sanctuaries and homes. It is workmanship drilled at the floors and forests of the sanctuaries portraying the god in the sanctuary. In each painting, the examples the moment subtleties, measurements and shading decision are chosen in recognition with severe standards. The examples change extensively relying upon the event.

== Influence on Modernism ==
Major exhibitions of tribal arts in the late 19th through mid-20th centuries exposed the Western art world to non-Western art. Such major exhibitions included the Museum of Modern Art's 1935 Africa Negro Art and 1941 Indian Art of the United States. Exposure to tribal arts have provided inspiration to many modern artists, such as Expressionists, Cubists, and Surrealists, notably Surrealist Max Ernst or Pablo Picasso, who stated that "primitive sculpture has never been surpassed."

== See also ==
- Antique Tribal Art Dealers Association
- Archaeological Resources Protection Act of 1979
- Australian aboriginal art
- Folk art
- John Young Museum of Art, Honolulu, including a tribal art gallery
- List of indigenous peoples
- Musée du quai Branly in Paris
- Museum of Primitive Art
- Papua New Guinea Sculpture Garden
- Native American Graves Protection and Repatriation Act
- Old media
- The Tribal Eye, a 1975 British television David Attenborough documentary
- Museum Rietberg www.rietberg.ch
- Indiana University Art Museum, Raymond and Laura Wielgus Collection Bloomington, Indiana
