= Tobé Coller Davis =

- Born: Tobe Coller; June 12, 1888; Milwaukee, Wisconsin, U.S.
- Died: December 25, 1962 (aged 74); New York City, New York, U.S.

Tobe Coller Davis (June 12, 1888 – December 25, 1962), more commonly known as Miss Tobe or Mrs Tobe Davis, was an American fashion authority and columnist. She founded The Tobé-Coburn School for Fashion Careers (now the Wood Tobé-Coburn School) and the Tobe Report, a fashion merchandising consulting company. She had a weekly syndicated fashion column entitled "Tobe Says" for the Herald Tribune.

== Biography ==
Davis was born in Milwaukee, Wisconsin, the only daughter of Oscar A. Coller (April 19, 1858 – October 26, 1920) and Taube (Tobea) Silberberg (January 18, 1869 – June 18, 1888). Six days after her birth, her mother died. When Tobea was three years old, her father married Sara Rich (June 11, 1869 – September 27, 1932). Oscar and Sarah, often called Sallie, had three additional children. She added the accented "é" to her name in order to gain acceptance from the French fashion industry.

== Career ==
In 1927, she founded the Tobe Report, a weekly fashion consulting think tank for retailers. In 1937 Davis and Julia Coburn, a former fashion editor for former fashion editor of the Ladies Home Journal and president of the Fashion Group (later the Fashion Group International, Inc.), co–founded the Tobé-Coburn School for Fashion Careers.

== Death ==
Davis died in New York City. Her body was returned for burial in Greenwood Cemetery, Milwaukee, Wisconsin, near the graves of both parents, her stepmother and her paternal grandparents.
