= ClassPass =

American fitness company

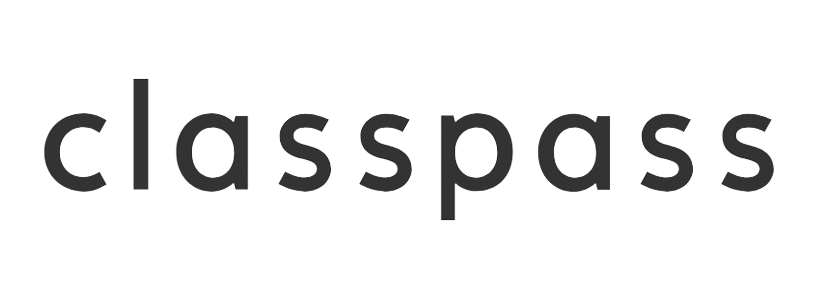
- Industry: Fitness, Wellness, Lifestyle
- Founded: June 1, 2013; 13 years ago
- Founders: Payal Kadakia; Sanjiv Sanghavi
- Headquarters: New York City, New York, U.S.
- Area served: Worldwide
- Key people: Fritz Lanman, CEO; Payal Kadakia, Chairwoman
- Parent: Playlist
- Website: classpass.com

ClassPass is an American company operating a subscription platform for fitness, wellness, lifestyle experiences, and more. Founded in 2013, it was acquired by Mindbody Inc in 2021. In June 2025, Playlist was created as a parent brand, uniting ClassPass with Mindbody & Booker under a single identity.

== History ==
The company was founded by Payal Kadakia and Sanjiv Sanghavi as Classivity in 2010. In 2012, the company launched Passport, allowing users to try one fitness class at a new studio. The company expanded its product to a subscription. The company brought on Mary Biggins to help build the new company, and ClassPass was developed in June 2013. In January 2014, Classtivity was rebranded as ClassPass.

Sanghavi left in January 2014. The same year, ClassPass acquired FitMob. An earlier version of the company's product was intended to sell a better registration system to fitness studios but this did not receive much interest.

In March 2017, Payal Kadakia swapped roles with Fritz Lanman, with Lanman becoming CEO and Kadakia becoming Executive Chairman. In August 2017, the company announced an expansion to New Orleans, Pittsburgh, San Antonio, Cincinnati, Calgary, Honolulu, Indianapolis, Milwaukee, Riverside, California, and Salt Lake City. In March 2018, ClassPass began offering live-streamed fitness classes.

In January 2019, ClassPass acquired Guavapass. Later that year, in October, Classpass acquired Swedish competitor Fitness Collection. Chilean-based MuvPass and ClickyPass, based in Argentina, were acquired in early 2020.

ClassPass was acquired by Mindbody Inc in 2021.

In 2024, the company added food and beverage partners, allowing users to spend credits at participating cafes.

== Financing ==
ClassPass received seed funding of $2 million in March 2014, then attracted $12 million in Series A round funding from entrepreneur Fritz Lanman in September 2014. In 2015, it received $40 million of Series B funding from General Catalyst and Thrive Capital. The company was valued as over $200 million. Classpass received an additional $30 million of funding in November 2015 led by Google Ventures. ClassPass announced a $70 million Series C led by Temasek Holdings in May 2017 that valued the company at $470 million. In July 2018, it raised US$85M in financing led by Temasek to expand into Asia. In January 2020, it raised $285 million in funding at a $1 billion valuation. In October 2021, the company was acquired by Mindbody Inc.

== Criticism ==
ClassPass has been criticized for undercutting the business model of the health clubs that it relies on, with a 2015 article in The New York Times describing it as a "middleman" between consumers and health clubs, and arguing that a "power imbalance" exists between the health clubs' owners and ClassPass which mirrors the relationship with other digital intermediary services such as Amazon.com and Uber. The service has accounted for lower margins at some gyms where owners limit the number of members "to prevent being cannibalized".

In May 2025, ClassPass disclosed data in an article with Athletech News to prove their incremental value to partners in the industry.

== See also ==
- Tech companies in the New York metropolitan area
