= The Tribal Eye =

- Genre: Documentary series
- Written by: David Attenborough
- Presented by: David Attenborough
- Country of origin: England
- Original language: English
- No. of series: 1
- No. of episodes: 7

Original release
- Release: 27 May 1975

The Tribal Eye is a seven-part BBC documentary series on the subject of tribal art, written and presented by David Attenborough. It was first transmitted in 1975.

== Episodes ==
=== 1. "Behind the Mask" ===
This episode centers on the life and customs of the Dogon people in Mali, concentrating primarily on their masks and mask rituals. After a brief introduction to the Dogon culture, the link between African and European art is elaborated upon, using works by Picasso and Braque as examples. Dogon blacksmiths are shown working on a sculpture and a monkey mask for an old woman's funeral; the funeral rites, which include masked performances and a staged mock battle, are shown in great detail.

=== 2. "Crooked Beak of Heaven" ===
In "Crooked Beak of Heaven", Attenborough discusses the art and cultures of the Indigenous peoples of the Pacific Northwest Coast of North America: The Haida of present-day British Columbia and Alaska; the Gitxsan of Skeena Country; and the Kwakwaka'wakw ("Kwakiutl") of present-day British Columbia, Washington, and Oregon. Includes footage with celebrated first nation carver Bill Reid, as he discusses the meanings of stylized motifs, as well as footage from Edward S. Curtis' early films. Also describes and includes footage of potlatch feasts.

=== 3. "The Sweat of the Sun" ===
On the ancient Aztecs and Incas.

=== 4. "Kingdom of Bronze" ===
On the ancient African kingdom of [Benin]. The bronze artifacts from the Benin Kingdom in modern-day Nigeria.

History: Vice-consul Phillips of UK came to Benin in 1897 to punish the King of Benin for not holding his part of the deal in a trading agreement. But at the time a ritual ceremony was being held to renew the strength of the King, so no visitors were allowed. After several warnings from both the King's and the British messengers, vice-consul Phillips still decided to go on with his journey. The result was an ambush of one of the King's chiefs. As the news of the massacre in Benin reached England, a punitive expedition was mounted. 1,500 marines marched onto Benin. After 4 days of sporadic fighting they took Benin City. Here they found the Bronze sculptures.

=== 5. "Woven Gardens" ===
On the nomadic Qashqai tribe of Iran. The tribal art of carpet-making in Persia and the distinctive patterns of the different clans and tribes.

=== 6. "Man Blong Custom" ===
On tribal communities in Melanesia.

=== 7. "Across the Frontiers" ===
This program revisits several of the locations of the previous programs to look more deeply at the relationships contemporary artists and collectors have with the art and artists of those societies, and how they may be compromising or enhancing the older traditions.

== Notes ==
- From DVD
