= Wood Tobé–Coburn School =

Private college in New York City

Coordinates: 40°45′06″N 73°58′52″W

Wood Tobé Coburn School Fashion District New York City, NY

Wood Tobé–Coburn School was a private for-profit career college in New York City. It closed in 2017.

== History ==
The Tobé–Coburn School for Fashion Careers was established in New York City by Miss Tobé, (née Tobé Coller Davis) an internationally known fashion authority, and Julia Coburn, former fashion editor of the Ladies Home Journal and president of the Fashion Group (later the Fashion Group International, Inc.). Tobé Coller Davis' establishment of the Tobe Report (a weekly fashion consulting report for retailers) in 1927, and the founding of the Tobé–Coburn School in 1937, were seminal events marking the rising significance of the New York City fashion industry. The school opened on September 13, 1937, and drew mostly young women students from across the United States. In June, 1992, the Tobé–Coburn School was merged into the Wood School; the latter founded in 1879. The change of the name from Tobé–Coburn School to the Wood Tobé–Coburn School occurred in June, 1993.

== Academics ==
The Wood Tobé–Coburn School awarded both diplomas and associate degrees. The school grouped its ten major areas of study into three main categories: business/fashion, health care, and technology.

== See also ==
- List of defunct colleges and universities in New York
