= Playlist.com =

Defunct Internet radio service

Playlist
- Company type: Private
- Available in: English
- Headquarters: San Francisco & Los Angeles, California
- Key people: Fritz Lanman, CEO
- Website: www.playlist.com
- Current status: Active

Playlist.com is a domain name that used to host a commercial-free Internet radio service called Playlist, which had approximately 60 million users. Now the domain houses Playlist, the parent brand of Mindbody, Booker, and ClassPass. In June 2025, the new Playlist website launched. With the brand's evolving suite of AI-enabled software and consumer apps, it plans to continue helping wellness businesses of all sizes thrive and empowering consumers to get off their screens and discover the things that move them.

== History ==
The original Playlist was founded in February 2006 by Jeremy Riney for the purpose of putting more music on Myspace and other social networking sites. From a userbase of less than 500,000 in mid-2006, it grew to more than 20,000,000 users as of June 30, 2008 and 50,000,000 users by June 30, 2011. It was originally known as Project Playlist with the domain name of projectplaylist.com, before it acquired its current domain name of playlist.com and became known as Playlist.com. On February 1, 2013 Playlist Media, Inc. acquired playlist.com and on July 1, 2013, Playlist.com relaunched as a personalized radio service. In June 2015, the Playlist.com personalized radio service was brought offline.

The current Playlist was launched in June 2025.

== Legal issues ==
Playlist experienced legal issues early in its history. Those issues have been resolved.

On April 28, 2008, the RIAA and a coalition of nine record labels filed a lawsuit against the company for contributing to mass copyright infringement. However, two similar cases against MySpace and Imeem were largely the opening moves in settlements which would see these music sites licensing the content and compensating artists for the use of their music. At the time of the lawsuit, Project Playlist already had begun contracts with Sony BMG.

On December 19, 2008, MySpace quickly began removing the Project Playlist music player from all profiles and subsequently leaving the affected users a message in their inbox which notified them of the removal. This amounted to a temporary ban of Project Playlist, largely due to complaints brought forth by the artists, asserting that Project Playlist should be paying royalties.

Facebook also later banned Project Playlist from its site.

On May 11, 2010, it was reported that Playlist reached a settlement with Universal Music Group and Warner Music Group for an undisclosed amount.

On February 1, 2013, the site playlist.com was acquired by a third party free of outstanding legal issues with the music recording and publishing industries.
