= Martha Hopkins Struever =

Native American art dealer

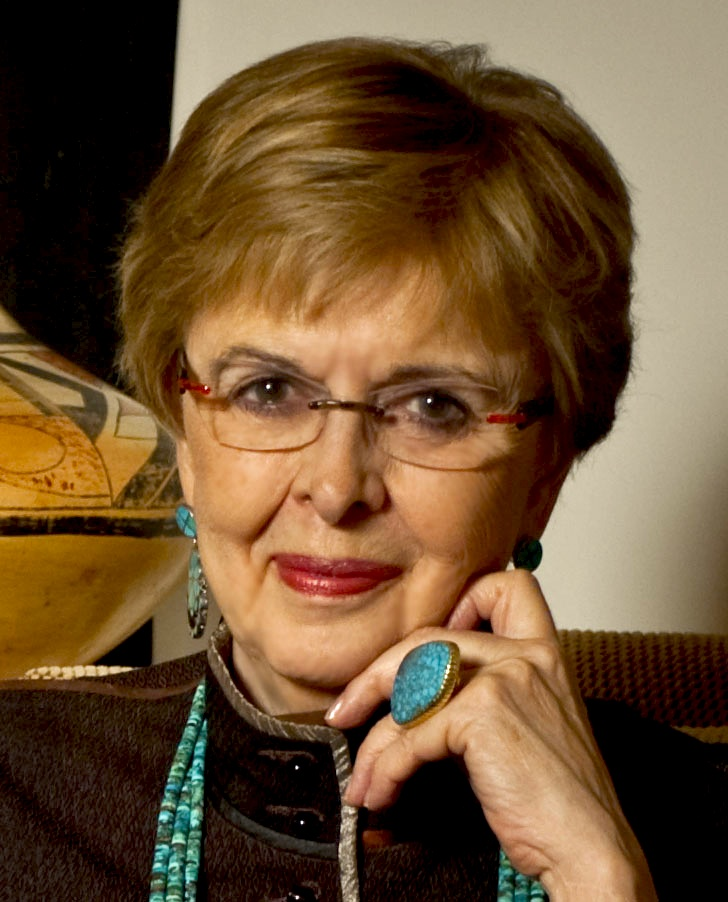
- At home in Santa Fe in 2008
- Born: November 14, 1931 Milan, Indiana
- Died: September 24, 2017 (aged 85) Santa Fe, New Mexico
- Occupation: American Indian art dealer, scholar, and author
- Genre: Native American art history

Website
- marthastruever.com

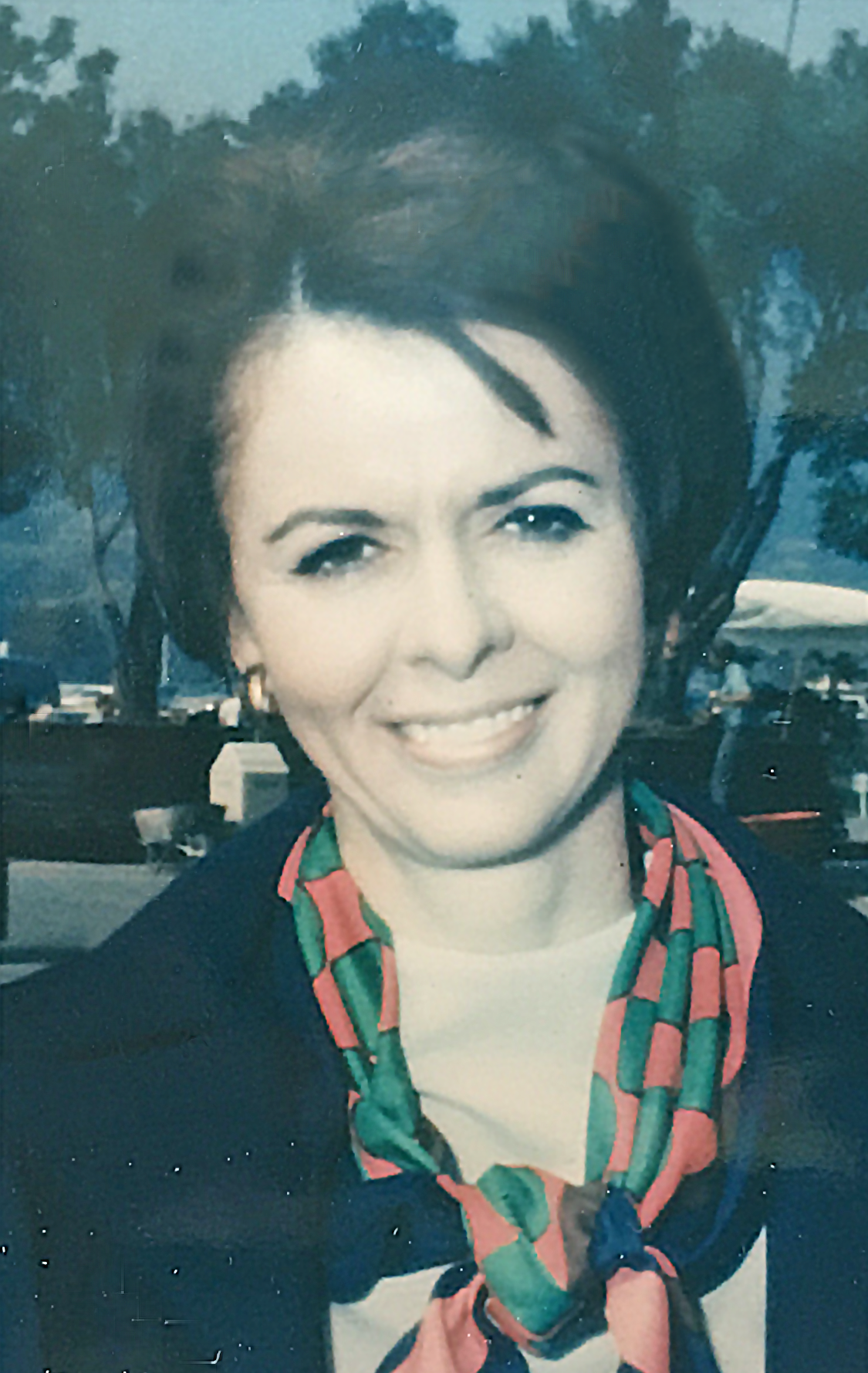
Martha Lee Hopkins Lanman Struever in California in 1968

Martha Hopkins Struever (1931–2017) was an American Indian art dealer, author, and leading scholar on historic and contemporary Pueblo Indian pottery and Pueblo and Navajo Indian jewelry. In June 2015, a new gallery in the Wheelwright Museum of the American Indian, was named for her. The first permanent museum gallery devoted to Native American jewelry, the Martha Hopkins Struever Gallery, is part of the Center for the Study of Southwestern Jewelry.

== Early personal life and education ==
Struever was born in 1931 in Milan, Indiana, the only child of Lester Harper Hopkins, M.D. and Eva Montalie (Neill) Hopkins. She grew up in rural southeastern Indiana in Versailles. After obtaining her Bachelor of Science degree from Purdue University in Lafayette, Indiana in 1953, Struever attended the Tobé-Coburn School For Fashion Careers (now the Wood Tobé Coburn School) in New York City. On November 16, 1953, she married Richard Burnham Lanman Sr. of Hammond, Indiana with whom she had two sons: Richard Burnham Lanman, M.D. and Todd Hopkins Lanman, M.D. She was widowed when Richard Sr. died of leukemia on December 8, 1966. Martha married Edgar Allen "Bud" Cusick in 1971 and divorced in 1988.

== Career ==
After being widowed, Struever began collecting and dealing in American Indian art. In 1971 she visited San Ildefonso Pueblo and purchased her first piece, a "gun metal sheen" pottery plate by Maria Montoya Martinez and her son Popovi Da. In 1976, she established the Indian Tree Gallery in Chicago, Illinois featuring historic and contemporary American Indian jewelry, pottery, Kachina dolls, weavings, and paintings. In order to bring the best Southwestern Indian artists to her Chicago gallery, she visited the Pueblo and Navajo reservations (often alone) to begin what were to become lifelong relationships with such prominent artists such as Charles Loloma, the foremost American Indian jeweler, and Dextra Quotskuyva, the pre-eminent contemporary Hopi potter. Martha helped many Indian artists gain exposure outside of Southwestern markets by sponsoring shows for them in Chicago. Martha hosted Maria Martinez at her Chicago gallery in 1977 - and arranged a special reception at the Chicago Art Institute for the then 90-year-old potter. In addition to prominent artists, a primary focus of Martha's career has been the identification and encouragement of talented new Indian potters and jewelers. Martha sponsored the first exhibitions of now-notable jewelers Gail Bird and Yazzie Johnson, Richard Chavez, Norbert Peshlaki, and Perry Shorty, as well as potters Dextra Quotskuyva, Steve Lucas and Les Namingha.

On November 12, 1988, Struever married noted archaeologist Stuart M. Struever and relocated to Santa Fe, New Mexico. By 2006, she was recognized as the "grande dame" of American Indian art dealers, and received the first Lifetime Achievement Award from the Antique Tribal Art Dealers Association "for contributions to the understanding and preservation of tribal art".

Over the past thirty years, Struever conducted over sixty traveling art and archaeology seminars throughout Navajo and Pueblo lands. Her seminars were enriched by her relationships with the many Indian artists whose careers she has encouraged.

Struever's philanthropic work included overseeing nine Indian Art Shows in Chicago, Washington, DC, and Denver, bringing 25 artists to each event, for the benefit of the nonprofit Crow Canyon Archaeological Center. Crow Canyon was founded by her husband, Stuart Struever.

She had two sons. She died on September 24, 2017. The Martha Struever Indian Art Collection is now hosted by the Turquoise and Tufa Gallery in Santa Fe, New Mexico.

== Publications and scholarly work ==
Struever published reference works, authoring the two books "Loloma: Beauty Is His Name" (Wheelwright Museum, 2006) and "Painted Perfection: The Pottery of Dextra Quotskuyva" (Wheelwright Museum, 2002), as well as museum catalogues entitled "Nampeyo: A Gift Remembered" (Kendall College, Mitchell Museum, 1984), "Hopi Art: A Century of Continuity and Change" (San Francisco Museum of Craft and Folk Art, 1987), and "Legends of Pueblo Pottery" (Wheelwright Museum, 1997). She has guest curated museum exhibitions in several cities. As Struever's scholarly reputation has grown, she has become recognized as one of the foremost experts on the pottery of Nampeyo, the jewelry of Loloma and the works of other significant Southwestern Indian artists.
