= Richard B. Lanman =

American physician

Dr. Rick Lanman
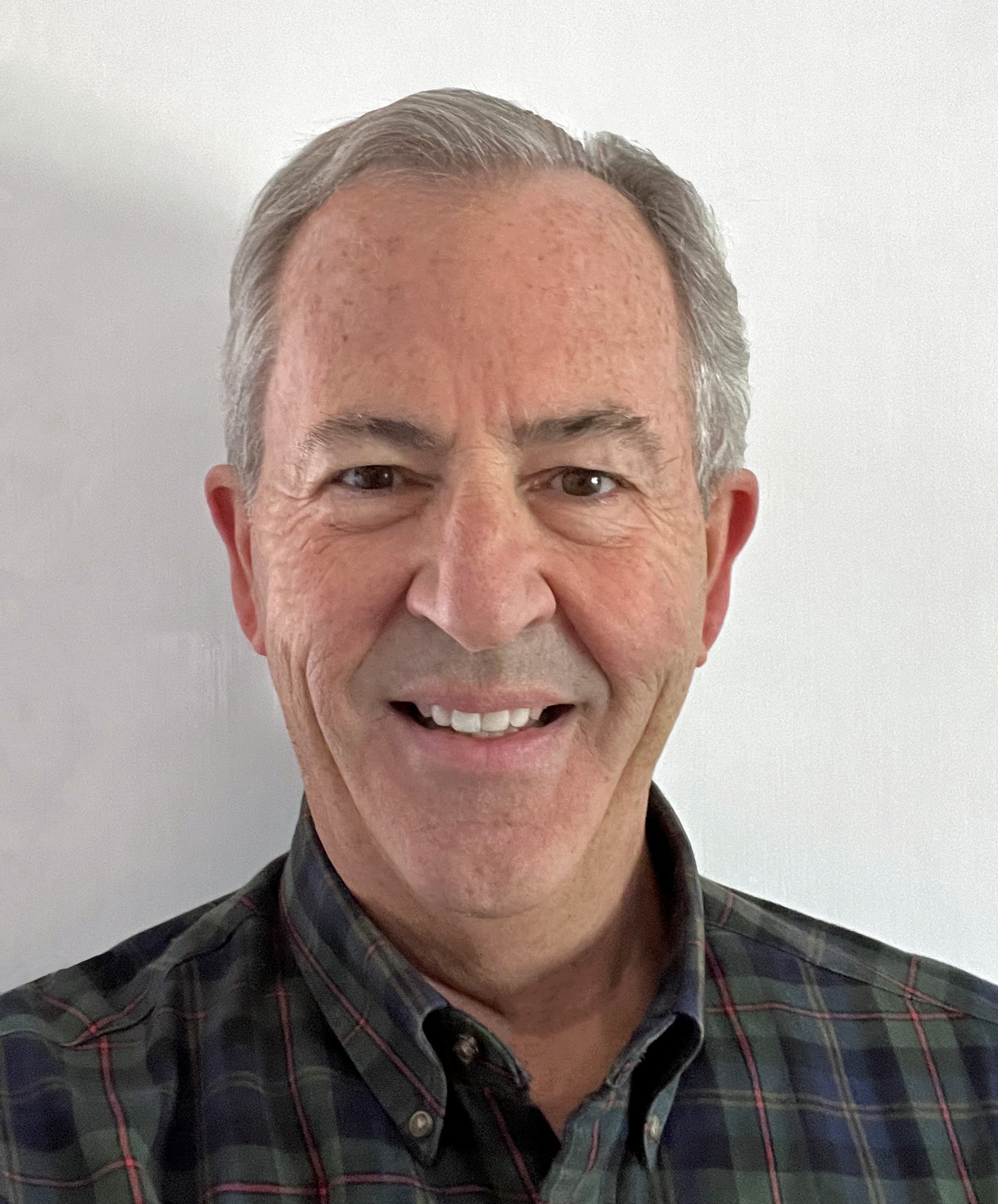
- Dr. Lanman at his home in 2023
- Born: Richard Burnham Lanman Jr. 1955 (age 70–71); Frankfurt am Main, Hesse, Germany
- Education: Stanford University, B.S. 1977; Northwestern University School of Medicine, M.D. 1980
- Occupations: Physician-scientist and Naturalist
- Years active: 1978-present
- Known for: Biomarkers in Cardiovascular disease and Cancer, and Historical ecology
- Relatives: Martha Lee Hopkins Struever (mother); Fritz Lanman (son); James Lanman (son)
- Medical career
- Profession: Medical Doctor
- Institutions: Guardant Health, Inc. Veracyte, Inc. diaDexus, Inc. Atherotech, Inc. San Jose Medical Group, Inc. Kaiser Permanente
- Research: Cancer genomics, Precision oncology, Cardiovascular Biomarkers, Thyroid cancer, Interstitial lung disease, Psychiatry, Ecology

Richard Burnham Lanman is an American physician. He worked as chief medical officer at Guardant Health, a personalized medicine company developing a blood test techniques that aim to sequence tumor DNA as an alternative to tissue biopsies. He has founded his own biotechnology company.

== Early life and education ==
Lanman was born at an U.S. Army Hospital in Frankfurt am Main, Hesse, Germany, in 1955. He is the son of American Indian art dealer and author Martha Lee Hopkins Lanman Struever and Lieutenant Richard Burnham Lanman Sr. Lanman grew up in Munster, Indiana where his parents had a hardware store. At age 11, his father died from leukemia. Lanman graduated Phi Beta Kappa at Stanford University, with a B.S. in Chemistry in 1977.

After obtaining his M.D. from the Northwestern University School of Medicine in 1980, Lanman began his medical internship at Northwestern Memorial Hospital, then in July 1981 began another medical internship at the University of California San Francisco Moffit Hospital. From 1982 to 1985 he completed his residency in psychiatry at Langley Porter Psychiatric Institute, also at UCSF. He became a diplomate of the American Board of Psychiatry and Neurology in 1990. During medical school and residency, Lanman authored journal articles in cardiology and psychiatry, including a book chapter.

== Career ==
Lanman began his medical career as an attending psychiatrist at Kaiser Permanente in Santa Clara County, California in 1985, where he served as Chief of Psychiatry and Chemical Dependency, then, as Chief of Quality. At Kaiser Lanman encouraged adoption of less invasive procedures and improvements in diagnosis in other specialties, culminating in a book chapter he authored on variation in physician practice patterns and hospitalization rates for children with asthma across Kaiser's 14 hospitals in Northern California.

=== Physician practice management ===
Lanman left Kaiser Permanente to serve as Chief Medical Officer and Sr. Vice President at San Jose Medical Group (SJMG), in San Jose, California from 1993 to 1995, a large multispecialty physician group practice. San Jose Medical Group was named the "most effective managed care medical group in the country" in 1996 by The Advisory Board Company.

In 1995, Lanman founded Adesso Healthcare Technology Services as Founder and Chief Executive Officer. Adesso offered an alternative to a cost-cutting approach by health maintenance organizations (HMOs) that had been using primary care physicians as gatekeepers, limiting access to specialty physician care. Under Adesso, patients could be referred to specialist physician networks, such as cardiologists or ophthalmologists, without preauthorization. In return the specialist networks contracted directly with health insurers, and instead of fee-for-service, the specialists were reimbursed utilizing severity-adjusted case rates for each episode of care. Adesso filed for an IPO in early 2000, however, the public offering succumbed to the stock market crash that year.

=== Biotechnology ===
Lanman transitioned to the biotechnology sector from physician practice management, first joining Atherotech, Inc. as Chief Medical Officer in 2000. Atherotech offered a cardiovascular biomarker diagnostic known as the Vertical Auto Profile- or VAP-expanded cholesterol and lipoprotein test, to improve prediction of risk of heart attack and stroke. There he published validation studies on the VAP test's unique lipoprotein (a) (Lp(a)) cholesterol measurement and other lipoprotein biomarkers. Atherotech was privately acquired by Behrman Capital.

In 2005, Lanman joined a second preventive cardiology biomarker company, diaDexus, Inc., as Executive Vice President and Chief Medical Officer. DiaDexus developed a test for lipoprotein-associated phospholipase A_{2} (Lp-PLA_{2}), the first FDA-cleared biomarker test to predict risk of stroke. DiaDexus completed a reverse IPO via merger with VaxGen in 2010.

After working in two companies to improve prediction of risk for cardiovascular events, Lanman joined Veracyte, Inc. in 2008 as Chief Medical Officer. Veracyte develops minimally invasive diagnostic tests utilizing genomics. Veracyte's initial genomics tests improved the diagnosis of thyroid nodules and lung nodules without resorting to surgery. Lanman was also principal investigator in a study validating Veracyte's third genomics test to improve diagnosis of idiopathic pulmonary fibrosis versus other idiopathic interstitial pneumonias. Veracyte, Inc. went public in October, 2013.

In September 2014, Lanman joined Guardant Health, Inc. where he served as Global Chief Medical Officer. Guardant's first diagnostic test, Guardant360^{®} enabled sequencing of the DNA in patients' advanced cancers with a simple blood test, as an aid in treatment selection for targeted therapy or immunotherapy without requiring invasive tissue biopsies. This non-invasive test was approved by Medicare to help identify targetable mutations in most solid tumor cancers in 2019. Guardant Health went public in October, 2018.

Lanman retired from Guardant Health on December 31, 2019, but continued as an Advisor through early 2021. He continues to research and publish in medicine and historical ecology, while also serving on the Boards of Chiara Biosciences, Inc., Circulogene, Inc., WeTree, Inc., and as an Advisor to Forward Health, Inc., Precede Biosciences, Sunbird Bio, Inc., and Teiko Bio, Inc. He was a past Board member of Biolase, Inc. from 2017 to 2022 and the American Psychiatric Association from 1983 to 1985.

=== Historical ecology ===
Lanman researches and publishes on California's historical ecology to improve and guide efforts at rewilding, often changing understanding of the historical fauna and flora of the state. His first historical ecology discovery was of lost specimens of steelhead trout (Oncorhynchus mykiss) in the collections of the California Academy of Sciences, establishing that in the 1890's the creek behind his house in Los Altos was a trout stream. Next, in a trio of publications, he and colleagues established novel physical evidence that the North American beaver (Castor canadensis) was native to most of California. A fourth publication reported the last record of beaver in the San Francisco Bay Area prior to their extirpation from the fur trade in the form of rock art, known as "Western Message Petroglyphs", which describe a vacant beaver lodge in the Alameda Creek watershed. In 2021, Lanman and colleagues published the results of an ancient DNA sequencing study of salmonid remains from archaeological excavations at Mission Santa Clara which extended the southern limit of the historical spawning range of Chinook salmon, 120 kilometres (75 mi) further south to San Jose, California. More recently, he proposed, along with the Muwekma Ohlone and Amah Mutsun tribes, restoration of tule elk (Cervus canadensis nannodes) to the San Francisco Peninsula and northern Monterey Bay regions. In 2023, he published, along with California Department of Fish and Wildlife (CDFW) and University of California, Berkeley biologists, a habitat suitability analysis which found long patches of habitat suitable for tule elk from Pacifica to the Pajaro River along the coastal and inland sides of the Santa Cruz Mountains.

== Representative publications ==
=== Journal articles ===
- Lanman RB; et al. (2006). "Lipoprotein-associated phospholipase A_{2}: review and recommendation of a clinical cut point for adults". Preventive Cardiology. 9 (3): 138–143. doi:10.1111/j.1520-037x.2006.05547.x. PMID 16849876.
- Alexander EK, Kennedy GC, Baloch ZW, Cibas ES, Chudova D, Diggans J, Friedman L, Kloos RT, LiVolsi VA, Mandel SJ, Raab SS, Rosai J, Steward DL, Walsh PS, Wilde JI, Zeiger MA, Lanman RB, Haugen BR (2012). "Preoperative diagnosis of benign thyroid nodules with indeterminate cytology". N Engl J Med. 367 (8): 705–15. doi:10.1056/NEJMoa1203208. PMID 22731672.
- Alexander EK, Kennedy GC, Baloch ZW, Cibas ES, Chudova D, Diggans J, Friedman L, Kloos RT, LiVolsi VA, Mandel SJ, Raab SS, Rosai J, Steward DL, Walsh PS, Wilde JI, Zeiger MA, Lanman RB, Haugen BR (2012). "Preoperative diagnosis of benign thyroid nodules with indeterminate cytology". N Engl J Med. 367 (8): 705–15. doi:10.1056/NEJMoa1203208. PMID 22731672.
- Lanman RB; et al. (2012). "'The historical range of beaver in the Sierra Nevada: a review of the evidence". California Fish and Wildlife Journal. 98 (2): 65–80.
- Lanman RB, Mortimer SA, Zill OA, Sebisanovic D, Lopez R, Blau S, Collisson EA, Divers SG, Hoon DS, Kopetz ES, Lee J, Nikolinakos PG, Baca AM, Kermani BG, Eltoukhy H, Talasaz A (2015). "Analytical and Clinical Validation of a Digital Sequencing Panel for Quantitative, Highly Accurate Evaluation of Cell-Free Circulating Tumor DNA". PLOS ONE. 10 (10) e0140712. Bibcode:2015PLoSO..1040712L. doi:10.1371/journal.pone.0140712. PMC 4608804. PMID 26474073.
- Zill OA, Banks KC, Fairclough SR, Mortimer SA, Vowles JV, Mokhtari R, Gandara DR, Mack PC, Odegaard JI, Nagy RJ, Baca AM, Eltoukhy H, Chudova DI, Lanman RB, Talasaz A (2018). "The Landscape of Actionable Genomic Alterations in Cell-Free Circulating Tumor DNA from 21,807 Advanced Cancer Patients". Clin Cancer Res. 24 (15): 3528–3538. doi:10.1158/1078-0432.CCR-17-3837. PMID 29776953.
- Slavin TP, Banks KC, Chudova D, Oxnard GR, Odegaard JI, Nagy RJ, Tsang KWK, Neuhausen SL, Gray SW, Cristofanilli M, Rodriguez AA, Bardia A, Leyland-Jones B, Janicek MF, Lilly M, Sonpavde G, Lee CE, Lanman RB, Meric-Bernstam F, Kurzrock R, Weitzel JN (2018). "Identification of Incidental Germline Mutations in Patients With Advanced Solid Tumors Who Underwent Cell-Free Circulating Tumor DNA Sequencing". J Clin Oncol. 36 (35): JCO1800328. doi:10.1200/JCO.18.00328. PMC 6286162. PMID 30339520.
- Lanman RB, Hylkema L, Boone CM, Allée B, Castillo RO, Moreno SA, Flores MF, DeSilva U, Bingham B, Kemp BM (2021). "Ancient DNA analysis of archaeological specimens extends Chinook salmon's known historic range to San Francisco Bay's tributaries and southernmost watershed". PLOS ONE. 16 (4) e0244470. Bibcode:2021PLoSO..1644470L. doi:10.1371/journal.pone.0244470. PMC 8049268. PMID 33857143.
- Lanman RB; et al. (2022). "A review of considerations for restoration of tule elk to the San Francisco Peninsula and northern Monterey Bay counties of California". California Fish and Wildlife Journal. 108 (3): 62–93. doi:10.51492/cfwj.108.14.

=== Book chapters ===
- Lanman RB et al. (1989) Reorganizing for the Future in Talbot JA (ed.) Future Directions for Psychiatry 172-180 ISBN 9780890422151
- Lanman R (1994) Improving Pediatric Asthma Care in a Health Maintenance Organization, in Horn SD and Hopkins DSP (ed.) Clinical Practice Improvement: A New Technology for Developing Cost-Effective Quality Health Care 169-174 ISBN 9781881393252.

== Personal life ==
Lanman married Alanna Purcell in 1978 and they raised five sons in Los Altos, California.

== See also ==
- Liquid biopsy
- Historical ecology
