= Papua New Guinea Sculpture Garden =

Sculpture garden at Stanford University

Coordinates: 37.42499°N 122.17355°W

In 1994, Jim Mason, a graduate student in the Department of Anthropology at Stanford University, arranged for two groups of men from the Sepik River region of Papua New Guinea to carve the New Guinea Sculpture Garden at Stanford University. The men were from several communities or villages of the Iatmul people and the Kwoma people.

The New Guinea Sculpture Garden is located in a small, wooded grove on the Stanford campus next to a dormitory. In addition to wooden and stone artworks, the garden also features landscaping and plants organized by Wallace M. Ruff, Professor Emeritus of Landscape Architecture, University of Oregon, and research fellow in the Department of Architecture and Building, Papua New Guinea University of Technology, Lae, Papua New Guinea. He was assisted by one of his students, Kora Korawali. The landscaping evokes the Sepik environment – river flanked by embankments - as well as the central plaza in Sepik villages, in front of an all-male cult house or men’s house, which are used for the staging of rituals.

The entrance to the garden is an open space, like the Sepik flood plain. But visitors quickly stroll into a forest of sculptures and trees reminiscent of a majestic Sepik cult house.

The garden is roughly organized into four zones. Near the entrance is a large, wooden eagle atop the shoulders of an ancestresses. This statue resembles the finials that often adorn Iatmul cult houses. Behind the eagle is a cluster of about a dozen, enormously tall wooden poles carved with exquisitely elaborate Iatmul and Kwoma motifs and patterns. A series of brightly painted Kwoma poles forms another aesthetic cluster, while the third area of the garden consists of large sculptures in pumice, an entirely new medium for the carvers since stone is rare in the Sepik flood plain. At night, the objects are aglow from ground-level spot lights.

The stone sculptures largely represent Sepik mythological creatures modeled after Western sculptures found elsewhere on the Stanford campus. The carved poles subtly blend traditional and modem motifs so that, for example, ancestresses wear grass skirts. Many of the carvings beautifully wind around the natural contours of the wood, a sense of three-dimensionality that was not traditionally incorporated into Sepik carving. One of the most brilliant works in the garden is a bare pole that contains only a hint of the sculpture it might have become. This work, titled "untitled,” expresses the processual aspects of the garden, and the unfinalizability and partiality of any interpretation.

The garden wonderfully plays with themes of light and shadow, revelation and concealment, nature and culture. It is and is not mysterious, contemplative, quiet, and surreal.

The logistics of the project were enormous. Mason raised $250,000 in individual donations. One could sponsor a fern for $250, a palm tree for $500, a bench for $750, and so forth. Large donations are acknowledged, like the artworks themselves, by name. Corporate donors included Bechtel Corporation, Chevron, and Airnuigini, the national airline of Papua New Guinea. Funds were also supplied by the National Endowment for the Humanities, Stanford University, and affluent Palo Alto families. The university allowed the garden a permanent site. Mason arranged for several dozen hardwood trees to be shipped to the campus from Asia. The ten woodcarvers were flown to California from the Sepik by way of Hong Kong, a journey that far exceeded any of their previous travels. Once they arrived, the carvers were the toast of Palo Alto and multicultural Stanford. They dined at catered events in mansions and performed with African-American drummers outside dormitories. The carvers, working on a six-month educational visa, were given local donations by individuals, organizations, and businesses of food, medical care, clothing, transportation, recreation, materials, and a trip to Disneyland. One of the Iatmul artists, Teddy Balangu from Palimbei village, later was an artist-in-residence at the Museum of Anthropology at UBC (University of British Columbia). He also spent time at Alcheringa Gallery in Victoria, British Columbia.

The "spirit of the project" framed the carvers as "artists" and not as exotic, anonymous specimens of primitive savagery and mystery. By labeling the men as "master carvers", the project positioned them in Western category defined by rare artistic genius, a category defined by the very terms of connoisseurship that once marginalized Melanesian art as something less refined than Western masterpieces or so-called "high art". This way, visitors approached the carvers and their works not as primitives and crafts but as authentic artists and art.

However, in Iatmul society, there is no comparable category of "master carver" in the local lexicon or social structure. Ironically, then, the garden fostered the Western appreciation of non-Western art by substituting one western category for another. One of the great aesthetic joys of the sculpture garden is the visual contemplation of the ironies that arise from the cross-cultural dialogue and categorization of artworks in the contemporary, transnational or globalized world.

A goal of the project was not to recreate a traditional Melanesian setting but, as Mason himself reported, to create "an opportunity to experiment with and reinterpret New Guinea aesthetic perspectives within the new context of a Western public art space." The carvers, it was hoped, would blend traditional, Sepik River themes with the ideals of Western modern art such as individualistic expression and the creation of art solely for a contemplative gaze (so-called "art for art's sake"). That is, the carvers were given an opportunity to "break free", in a sense, from the conventional aesthetic constraints of the village in the Papua New Guinea – to create art not possible in a Sepik River setting.

Much of the success of the project resulted from the interplay of different yet not-necessarily compatible cross-cultural categories: Melanesia/West, traditional/modern, art/culture, and so forth. Thus the men were brought to Stanford University on the basis of their Sepik River or Papua New Guinean identity; but once there, they were encouraged to think of themselves not as Papua New Guineans but as artists. Moreover, the artists were given considerable input into the project, thus intentionally dispersing "curatorial authority" such that, in contrast to most museums, the "tribal" artists are lent considerable "voice" in the final display of their works, and in choose how and what works to display. Similarly, the garden foregrounds the individuality of the artists – identifying them by name on each piece, which rarely, if ever, occurs in museum displays of "traditional" tribal art.

An essential part of the six-month process was a variety of collaborative programs: daily site tours, bamboo flute performances by the carvers, a public lecture series, Friday night barbeques, "story-time" with the artists, and outreach programs for school children, such as on-site bark painting. These interactive encounters are vital to the authenticity of the works.

The sculptures that received the greatest amount of press and attention were two carvings in wood and pumice respectively that intentionally resemble Rodin sculptures displayed elsewhere on the Stanford campus, The Thinker and The Gates of Hell. Both sculptures were carved by the two Iatmul men from Tambunum village. According to Simon, when he saw The Thinker in the Iris & B. Gerald Cantor Center for Visual Arts on campus, he thought to himself, "I can do this - even better!"

The Papua New Guinea Sculpture Garden has its own Facebook page.

== Tours ==
The Iris & B. Gerald Cantor Center for Visual Arts leads tours of the Papua New Guinea Sculpture Garden on the fourth Sundays of the Month, 11:30 am, rain or shine; meet on the corner of Santa Teresa and Lomita Drive. "Created on-site at Stanford by artists from Papua New Guinea, the garden contains wood and stone carvings of people, animals, and magical beings that illustrate clan stories and creation myths."
