= Antique Tribal Art Dealers Association =

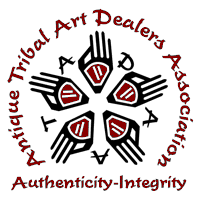

The Antique Tribal Art Dealers Association (ATADA), was founded in 1988, by a group of independent antique tribal art dealers to form a professional association of dealers that would provide education for the public and set standards for the trade. They recognized that tribal and ethnographic art had reached a level of specialization found in other art fields and were concerned by the volume of misidentified and pastiche materials on the market. Members offer buyers a guarantee that objects they sell are as represented regarding age, authenticity and extent of restoration.

== Goals and objectives of ATADA ==
The ATADA is a non-profit membership organization of respected and established tribal art dealers from across the United States. ATADA was formed to represent professional dealers of antique tribal art. Their objectives are to promote professional conduct among dealers and to educate the public in the valuable role of tribal art in the wealth of human experience. The organization's highest-priority goals, are: 1) to encourage the public to educate themselves in the cultures these objects represent and the roles they played within the cultures; and 2) to provide a set of standards for the trade and present ourselves to the public as a trustworthy association of art dealers adhering to the tenets outlined in ATADA bylaws.

Included in the ATADA goals statement is the assurance that "the materials and goods utilized or accorded reverence by functioning religious or cultural communities, as part of their system of religious beliefs or practices, should receive appropriate protection from commercial exploitation and market pressures. Tribal leaders, dealers in tribal arts and appropriate government officials should work together to establish norms and procedures for ensuring that protection. Concern for the protection of legitimate, ongoing religious beliefs and practices, however, should not constitute grounds for objection to trade in objects that are no longer of religious significance to any extant culture, whether due to extinction of the religious system or the fact that the object itself has lost whatever religious significance it might once have had. Nor should such concerns interfere with the right of the legitimate owners of ceremonial objects to dispose of those objects as they see fit, as long as no applicable laws are violated."

The ATADA currently publishes The ATADA News and The ATADA Membership Directory. The first issues of the ATADA Newsletter were published in 1988, first edited by Gary Spratt, then by Ramona Morris, then by Gordon Lorenzo Fritz, then by Alice Kaufman. The name of the publication is now the ATADA News.

== Membership ==
Members are generally regarded as authorities in the field of antique tribal art. ATADA Members are required to uphold ethical standards as defined in the ATADA Bylaws, and must agree to honor the ATADA guarantee of authenticity and condition for all American Indian and Tribal Art sales. In addition to demonstrating a commitment to enriching the cultural lives of their communities, members share their expertise through significant exhibition, informative catalogs, and by offering quality works of art whose authenticity is unconditionally guaranteed.

The "2009—2010 ATADA Members Gallery and Directory" lists members by surname and allows them to post a full-color, annotated image of some of their best available pieces. ATADA has vetted the images of all objects displayed, while each member retains responsibility for authenticating and identifying their own objects. Each ATADA member has pledged to honor the guarantee of authenticity and condition.

On February 24, 2006 the ATADA launched a Lifetime Achievement Award "for contributions to the understanding and preservation of tribal art".

The organization’s budget for 2020 was $122,111.

== Antique tribal art shows ==
ATADA has worked in association with promoters to help vet their shows, recruiting a group of qualified volunteer experts. ATADA vetters assisted at the Santa Fe Historic Indian and World Tribal Arts show in 2006 and The Marin Art of the Americas show in San Rafael, California in 2007. It is an ATADA goal that vetted shows will soon become the standard.

== ATADA Lifetime Achievement Awards ==
The ATADA Lifetime Achievement Awards recognize and celebrate the outstanding accomplishments and contributions of people whose work has been both groundbreaking and instrumental to the fields of American Indian and Tribal art.

Lifetime Achievement Awards Honorees
Year	Name
2007	Martha Hopkins Struever (American Indian art dealer, author); Quintus & Mary Herron (philanthropists, tribal art collectors); John and Anne Summerfield (scholars who donated their collection of Minangkabau textiles (Sumatra, Indonesia) to the Fowler Museum of Cultural History at UCLA; Stuart McKee Struever (archeologist); Warren M. Robbins (founder National Museum of African Art at the Smithsonian Institution)

== ATADA presidents ==
- Founder and President: Gary Spratt — 1988, 1989
- James Reid — 1990
- Bob Gallegos — 1991
- Jan Duggan — 1992, 1993
- Interim Leadership: Robert V. Gallegos and Taylor A. Dale — 1994, 1995, 1996
- Marcy Burns — 1997, 1998
- Robert Bauver — 1999, 2000
- Christopher Selser — 2001, 2002
- Ramona Morris — 2003, 2004
- Merrill Domas — 2005, 2006
- Thomas Murray — 2007, 2008
- Arch Thiessen — 2009, 2010
- Kim Martindale — 2019, 2020

== Administration ==
As of 2020, Robert Gallegos is the Executive Director.
