= Charles J. Lanman =

American lawyer

Mayor of Norwich, Connecticut
- In office 1838

Personal details
- Born: Charles James Lanman; June 5, 1795 Norwich, Connecticut
- Died: July 25, 1870 (aged 75) New London, Connecticut
- Spouse: Marie Jeanne Guie (m. 1819)
- Relations: 9, including Charles
- Parent(s): James Lanman; Marian Griswold Chandler
- Education: Yale College
- Occupation: Lawyer, politician, real estate investor

Charles James Lanman (June 5, 1795 – July 25, 1870) was an American lawyer and politician.

== Early life ==
Lanman was born on June 5, 1795, in Norwich, Connecticut. He was one of four sons and eight daughters born to James Lanman (1769–1841) and Marian Griswold (née Chandler) Lanman (1774–1817), a granddaughter of Governor Matthew Griswold. His father was a U.S. Senator from Connecticut who was a cousin of Presidents John Adams and John Quincy Adams.

He attended Yale College, from where he graduated in 1814.

== Career ==
Following his graduation from Yale, he studied law with his kinsman, Roger Griswold (the former Governor of Connecticut), and with his father before being admitted to the bar in 1817.

=== Michigan Territory ===
Although he was invited by Henry Clay to settle in Kentucky, Lanman migrated to the Michigan Territory in 1817 on the invitation of his friends, William Woodbridge (later a U.S. Senator and Governor of Michigan) and Lewis Cass (the 2nd Governor of the Michigan Territory and later the Secretary of War under Jackson, U.S. Ambassador to France under Jackson, Van Buren, Harrison, Tyler and Secretary of State under Buchanan), making the journey from Buffalo to Detroit largely on horseback.

While in Michigan, Lanman began practicing law as a partner with Woodbridge.

As a result of riding the legal circuit he came to Frenchtown (now Monroe), on the River Raisin, where he met Marie Jeanne Guie, who he married in 1819. At that point Lanman became a resident of Frenchtown. In Frenchtown (and later Monroe), he held many local positions, such as attorney for the Territory, Judge of Probate, colonel of Militia, inspector of customs, and postmaster of Monroe. President Monroe appointed him receiver of public moneys for the District of Michigan and he was reappointed by President Adams, serving from 1823 to 1831. He was also an extensive dealer in public lands; owning at one time the entire site upon which the city of Grand Rapids was built, and was one of the founders of the town of Tecumseh."

=== Later life ===
He returned to Norwich in 1835 for "family considerations". Although he lost the bulk of his properties in Michigan during the Panic of 1837, he was chosen Mayor of Norwich in 1838 and then president of the Norwich Water Power Company. In 1862, he moved to New London, Connecticut "because of his intense love of the scenery and air of the ocean."

== Personal life ==
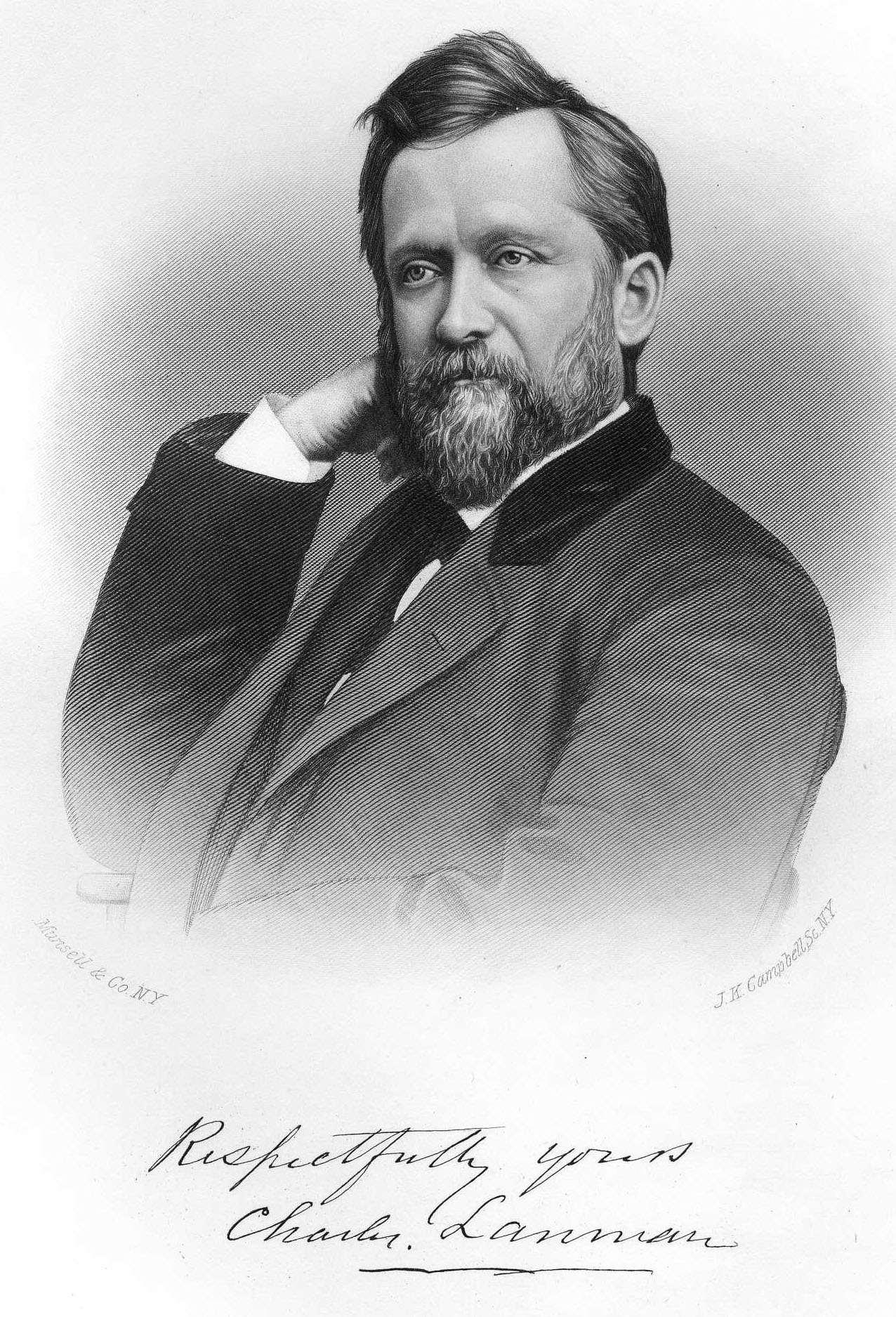
Engraving of his son, Charles Lanman

On March 19, 1819, Lanman was married to Marie Jeanne Guie (1801–1879), a native of Canada who was a daughter of Antoine Francois Guie and Mary Angelica (née Bourdeau) Guie. Together, they were the parents of nine children, seven daughters and two sons, of whom the following survived to adulthood:

- Charles James Lanman (1819–1895), who married Adeline Dodge, a daughter of Francis Dodge of Georgetown, in 1849.
- Marie Louisa Lanman (1822–1893), who married, as his third wife (after the death of her sister), John De Peyster Douw Jr., a son of John De Peyster Douw and Catherine (née Gansevoort) Douw.
- Julia Woodbridge Lanman (1824–1903), who married William Pierpont Williams in 1851.
- Marianna Chandler Lanman (1826–1884), who married, as his second wife, John De Peyster Douw Jr.
- Elizabeth Gray Lanman (1829–1883), who married lawyer Darius G. Crosby in 1866.
- Sarah Cort Lanman (1833–1899), who married her cousin, Thomas Hubbard.
- Mary Jane Lanman (1834–1894), who married New York lawyer Edmund J. Vose.
- Roger Griswold Lanman (1836–1845), who died young of yellow fever.
- Susan Harmer Lanman (1838–1914), who died unmarried.

Lanman died in New London on July 25, 1870. His widow died at their daughter Susan's residence in East Orange, New Jersey, in 1879 and was buried with Lanman in Norwich.
