= James Lanman (musician) =

American singer-songwriter

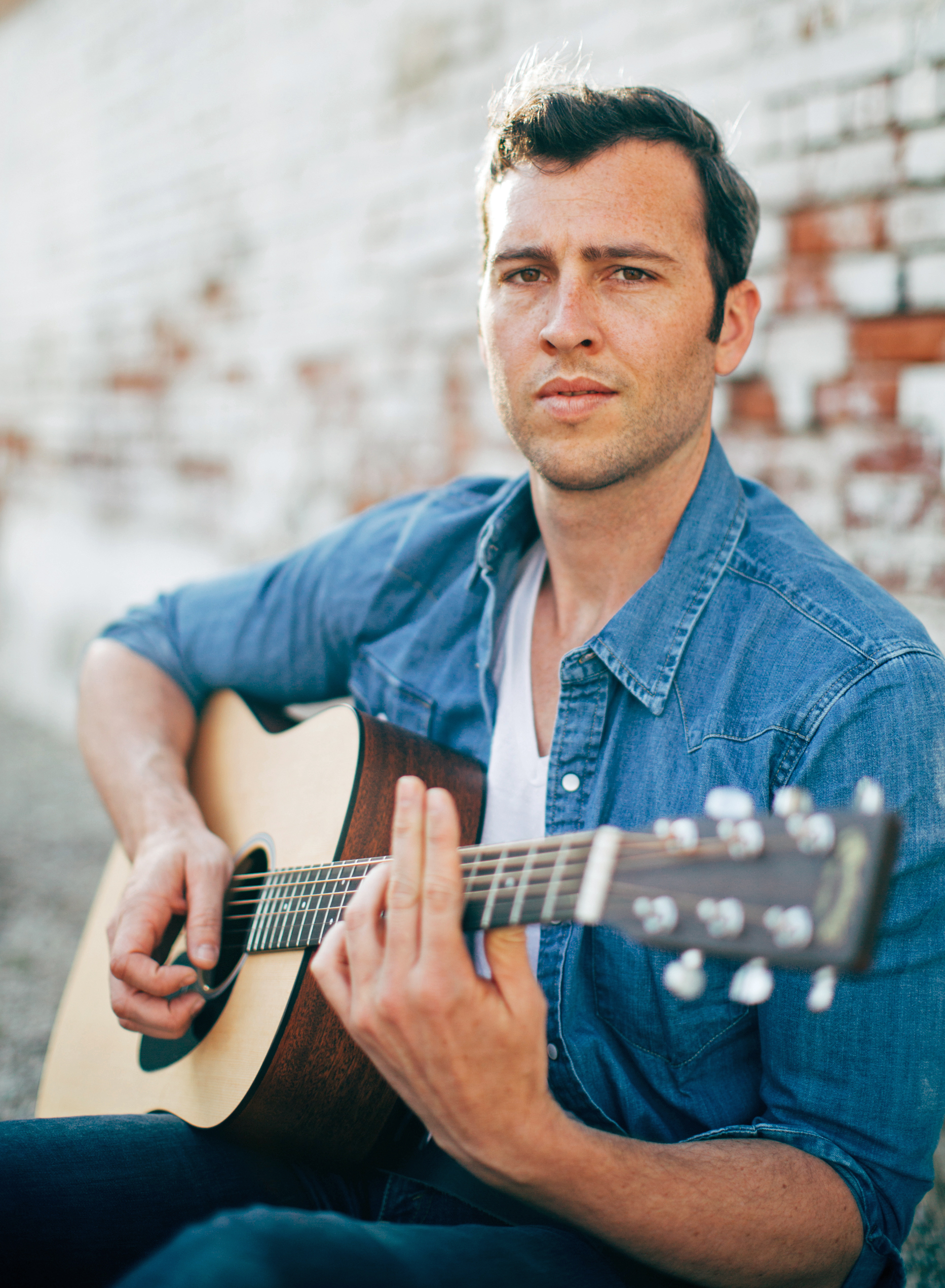
- James Lanman in 2017
- Born: James Lanman; San Francisco, California
- Citizenship: American
- Education: University of California, Berkeley
- Occupations: singer-songwriter; musician; composer
- Years active: 2008–present
- Musical career
- Genres: Neo soul
- Instruments: Vocals; Guitar; Piano
- Website: jameslanman.com

James Lanman is an American singer-songwriter from California. Lanman founded the indie pop rock band, "The Good Hurt" in Seattle circa 2009. After four years and two national tours playing festivals such as SXSW and CMJ, he launched a solo career in 2013 and produced his debut album Live at the Blue Boar Inn in 2017. This album kicked off his "The 100 Days Tour", a national grassroots singing tour.

== Early life ==
Lanman is the second of five sons of Dr. Richard Lanman and Alanna Purcell Lanman, and born in Los Altos, California. He grew up and attended high school in Los Altos, California where he played four sports but ironically did not make the cut for the prestigious Main Street Singer's program. Lanman would later attend the University of California, Berkeley, where he graduated with a BA in Theater and Performance Studies as well as a minor in Rhetoric in 2007.

== Career ==
Lanman's music career began as a house music DJ in high school. He later worked as a resident DJ in Florence, Italy where he purchased a used guitar for $60 and began writing songs on it. His career as a singer songwriter took him up and down the West Coast from Los Angeles to Seattle where he performed with The Seattle Rock Orchestra at the Moore Theatre. Singing gigs took him abroad to London and Scandinavia, where Lanman starred in an internationally televised commercial for IF Insurance Company singing a cover of Stevie Wonder’s Don't You Worry 'bout a Thing.

In 2009, he founded an indie rock band called "The Good Hurt" in Seattle. The band toured nationally playing festivals from CMJ in New York City to South by Southwest in Austin, Texas. After making a name for himself in Seattle as both an independent artist and as frontman of "The Good Hurt", Lanman left in 2013 for Brooklyn.

Lanman produced his debut solo EP in the same Brooklyn studio frequented by the likes of Skrillex, Jhené Aiko, Joey Bada$$ and Kid Cudi, whose career-defining single, Day 'n' Nite, was recorded there in 2009. He continued composing original music and performing at various venues around New York City, while. He programmed UX/UI (user experience/user interface) for mobile devices, supplementing his music income by freelancing for technology companies, until getting two simultaneous job offers. He ended up rejecting both programmer jobs and decided to devote himself to music full-time. Thus, the idea of "The 100 Days Tour" was born. In November 2016 Lanman sold off as much as he could of his personal possessions minus his musical instruments. He moved from New York to California, re-engineered a Sprinter van into a mobile studio and home and booked 100 house concerts and DIY venues across the country through his fan network. The tour kicked off at the Blue Boar Inn near Park City where he produced his first solo album Live from the Blue Boar in January 2017. On the tour, Los Angeles podcaster Chris Denson interviewed Lanman and recorded his performance live for ‘’Innovation Crush’’ in May 2017. Denson described the former graphic and web designer turned musician/entrepreneur as mastering "a new art of connection... through simple intimate performances on his 100-day tour". In July 2017 Lanman gave a TEDx talk at TEDxFargo 2017 in North Dakota.

In 2018 and 2019, Lanman continued to compose original music and perform, putting out two additional solo albums "Mosaics" and "Merry Christmas Darling". His tours included charitable events for the National Scoliosis Society and Habitat for Humanity.

== Awards ==
- Airwalk Unsigned Hero, 2nd place

== Discography ==
- Live at the Blue Boar Inn, Release date: January, 2017
- "Mosaics", Release date: April, 2019
- "Merry Christmas Darling", Release date: November, 2019

=== Music videos ===
- IF Insurance commercial music video
- Only In Your Mind // The Good Hurt [Official Music Video]
