= Charles Lanman =

American librarian (1819–1895)

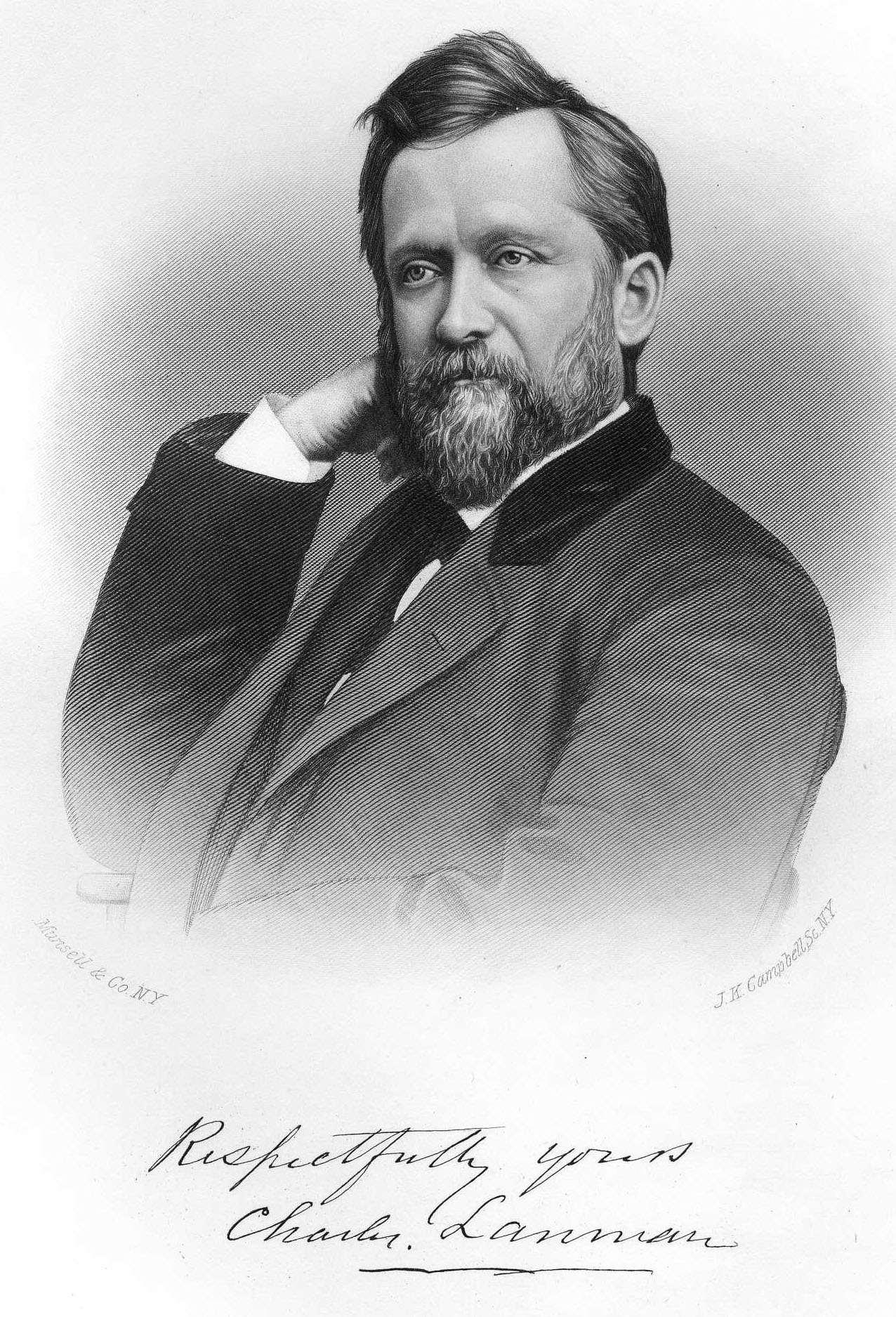
- Engraving of Charles Lanman by J. K. Campbell, Sr. for Munsell & Co., New York, in the 1890 History of Monroe County, Michigan by Talcott E. Wing
- Born: June 14, 1819; Monroe, Michigan
- Died: March 4, 1895 (aged 75); Georgetown, D.C.
- Occupations: Librarian, explorer, author, painter, government official
- Spouse: Adeline Dodge (1826–1914) (m. 1849)
- Parent(s): Charles J. Lanman; Marie Jeanne Guie
- Relatives: James Lanman (grandfather)

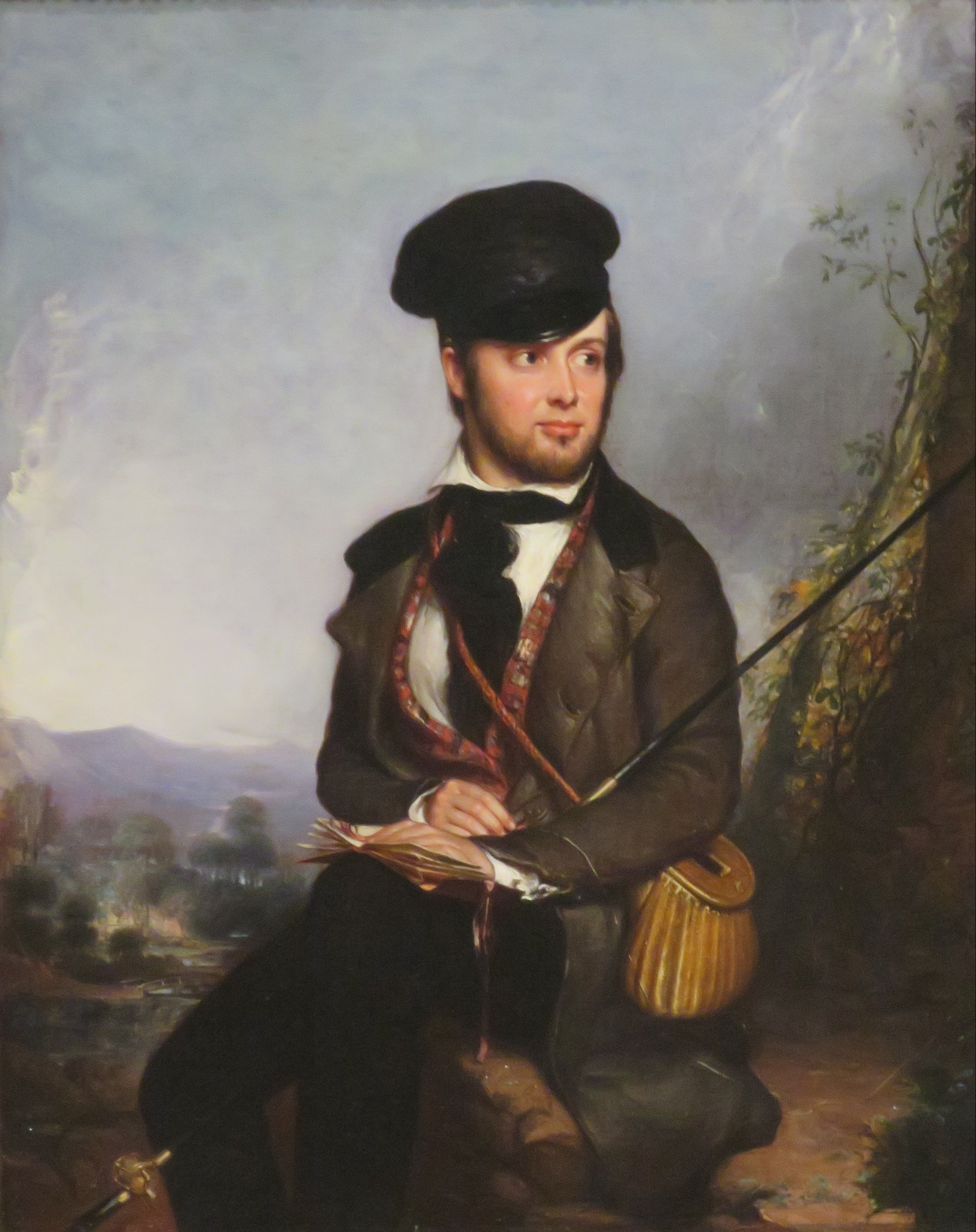
The Angler, a portrait of Charles Lanman by William James Hubard

Charles Lanman (June 14, 1819 - March 4, 1895) was an American author, government official, artist, librarian, and explorer.

== Biography ==
Charles Lanman was born in Monroe, Michigan, on June 14, 1819, the son of Charles James Lanman, and the grandson of United States Senator James Lanman.

Lanman's early life included newspaper work as editor of the Monroe Gazette in 1845, associate editor of the Cincinnati Chronicle in 1846, and member of the editorial staff of the New York Express in 1847. He spent ten years, from 1835 to 1845, studying with Hudson River School artists in New York City, where he met many artists, including Washington Irving. Lanman studied art under Asher B. Durand and at 28 became an elected associate of the National Academy of Design in 1846.

Lanman's career included service as librarian for the U.S. War Department (1849-1850), private secretary to Senator Daniel Webster (1850-1853), librarian and the head of the returns office in the U.S. Interior Department (1853 and 1855-1857), and librarian for the U.S. House of Representatives (1861-1865). He was also the librarian for the City of Washington Library, the American secretary to the Japanese legation, and assistant assessor for the District of Columbia.

Lanman married Adeline Dodge in 1849; they had no children. They raised Tsuda Ume (December 31, 1864 – August 16, 1929) from March 1872 to 1882. Ume had been sent by the Japanese government as part of the Iwakura Mission; one of its goals was to study educational systems in the U.S. Ume later founded Tsuda College for women in Tokyo.

Charles Lanman died at Georgetown, D.C., on March 4, 1895.

== Literary and artistic works ==
=== Writing ===
Charles Lanman collected biographies of former and sitting Members of Congress for his Dictionary of the United States Congress, published by J. B. Lippincott & Co. in 1859. This eventually became the Biographical Directory of the United States Congress. Lanman's published writings include several collections of essays and books, including two biographies, The Private Life of Daniel Webster (New York and London, 1852) and Life of William Woodbridge (Washington, 1867).

Written accounts of his own travels and extensive explorations in the United States included:

- Essays for Summer Hours (Boston, 1842)
- Letters from a Landscape-Painter (1845)
- A Summer in the Wilderness, Embracing a Canoe Voyage Up the Mississippi and Around Lake Superior (New York, 1847)
- A Tour of the River Saguenay (Philadelphia and London, 1848)
- Letters from the Alleghany Mountains (New York, 1849)
- Haw-ho-noo, or Records of a Tourist (Philadelphia: Lippincott, Grambo 1850),
- Adventures in the Wilds of the United States and British American Provinces (2 vols., Philadelphia, 1856, London, 1859)
- Red Book of Michigan: A Civil, Military and Biographical History (Detroit, 1871)".

Additional works included:

- Resources of America compiled for the Japanese government (Washington, 1872)
- The Japanese in America (New York and London, 1872)
- Biographical Annals of the Civil Government of the United States (Washington, 1876; 2d ed., revised, New York, 1887)
- Life of Octavius Perinehief (Washington, 1879)
- Curious Characters and Pleasant Places (Edinburgh, 1881)
- Leading Men of Japan (Boston, 1883)
- Farthest North (New York, 1885)
- Haphazard Personalities (Boston, 1886).

He edited The Prison Life of Alfred Ely (New York, 1862), and The Sermons of Reg. Octavius Perinchief (2 vols., Washington, 1879). He also produced scientific articles such as "The Salmonidae of Eastern Maine, New Brunswick, and Nova Scotia".

=== Art ===
Lanman frequently exhibited paintings and sketches from nature in oil. He made “sketching trips” to every state east of the Rockies. Many of those early sketches were published in The Illustrated London News and in various American magazines. Among his pictures are Brookside and Homestead, Home in the Woods (1881), and Frontier Home (1884). He was called by Washington Irving "the picturesque explorer of the United States".

== Sources ==
- http://shs.umsystem.edu/manuscripts/invent/3725.pdf
- https://web.archive.org/web/20080917190658/http://www.gpoaccess.gov/serialset/cdocuments/hd108-222/intro.pdf
