= Fashion Group International =

The Fashion Group International (FGI) is a global, non-profit, professional organization founded in 1930 in New York City to benefit the fashion industry. FGI currently has over 5000 members in the fashion industry including apparel, accessories, beauty and home. FGI is divided into chapters in cities all over the world (Canada, Colombia, United Kingdom, Mexico, Dominican Republic, South Korea), with the major chapter in New York City.

== History ==
FGI began in 1928 when Edna Woolman Chase, the editor-in-chief of Vogue, gathered seventeen women for lunch in a New York restaurant. The group was formed officially in 1930 in New York City. Founding and charter members included Elizabeth Arden, Julia Coburn, Eleanor Roosevelt, Helena Rubinstein, Lilly Daché, Edith Head, Mary Brooks Picken, Claire McCardell, and Tobé Coller Davis. Each woman had a significant role in the fashion industry, one of them being to spread awareness about the fashion business and the roles women had in the business. In 1930, The Fashion Group became an organization. There were many women who wanted to become members of the organization. The Fashion Group was located in New York City. One of their offices was located on East 12th Street, donated by Louis Fairchild. Another one of their offices was donated by Harper's Bazaar, located at 572 Madison Avenue.

== Present day ==
Fashion Group International remains headquartered in New York City. Today, the company size ranges from 51 to 200 employees. Their primary location is 8 West 40th Street, 7th Floor, New York, NY 10018. The Fashion Group International hosts a gala called the "Night of Stars".

== Archives ==
The Fashion Group's archives, spanning six decades of the fashion industry, are now housed at the New York Public Library.
