= Chris Denson (innovator) =

American innovator

- Born: Chris Denson; Detroit, Michigan
- Education: Michigan State University
- Notable work: Innovation Crush

Comedy career
- Years active: 1998–present
- Medium: Entertainment, educator, podcast host
- Genres: Innovation, pop culture, business, humor
- Website: Innovation Crush

Chris Denson (born January 6, 1976) is an American innovation expert, marketer, and humor enthusiast. He is the host of the Innovation Crush podcast, and runs an innovations team at Omnicom Group.

== Early life ==
Denson was born in Detroit, Michigan to Christine Denson, a school teacher, and John Denson, a theologian. He attended Southfield-Lathrup High School in Lathrup Village, Michigan. Throughout high school, Denson was a member of the marching band, and participated on the swim team, track, cross country, and golf. He was also a member of the student council.

Denson attended Michigan State University, where he earned a degree in packaging engineering and was a member of the school's martial arts team. While there, he began to explore stand-up comedy and comedy writing by performing at local nightclubs and creating his own sketch comedy TV series that aired locally in Lansing, Michigan. He won several comedy competitions, and landed an appearance on USA's Up All Night with Gilbert Gottfried.

== Career ==
After a brief stint as an engineer at Daimler-Chrysler, Denson moved to Los Angeles to pursue the entertainment industry full-time. Shortly after his move, he worked as a production assistant on the Leeza Gibbons Show, and months later landed his first job as a writer on the BET series Live From LA.

While working as an associate producer for Playboy Television, Denson developed the marketing plan for the network's launch of a hip hop channel, Hype TV.

Denson has held posts in several organizations, including head of marketing for American Film Institute's Digital Content Lab, founder of Genius Effect Media Group, director of Innovation at the Regan Group, director of Omnicom Group's Ignition Factory, director of marketing for the New York Film Academy, and consultant to organizations from Africa to Italy.

Denson also serves as an advisory board member on the SXSW Accelerator, Google Launchpad, and the White House's Global Entrepreneurship Summit. He has served on the White House Council of Excellence.

Denson is a regular guest speaker at industry trade events and educational institutions. He currently serves on the board of the Girls Academic Leadership Academy, the first public girls' STEM school in the state of California.

Denson has been a contributing author for Inc.

=== Innovation Crush podcast ===
In 2013, Denson launched Innovation Crush, an interview series focused on the lives and projects of some of the world's most influential innovators. Guests have included Daymond John, Elizabeth Gore, Nolan Bushnell, Damian Kulash, Alexis Ohanian, Rob Dyrdek, Cindy Gallop.

The podcast covers marketing ideas, technology innovations, and disruptive business models. It has been a featured listening program on Delta Air Lines flights.

=== Awards and nominations ===
- Adweek's 12 Most Successful Media Agency Executives in Southern California
