= Mindbody Inc. =

American software company

Coordinates: 35.247128°N 120.643251°W

MINDBODY, Inc.

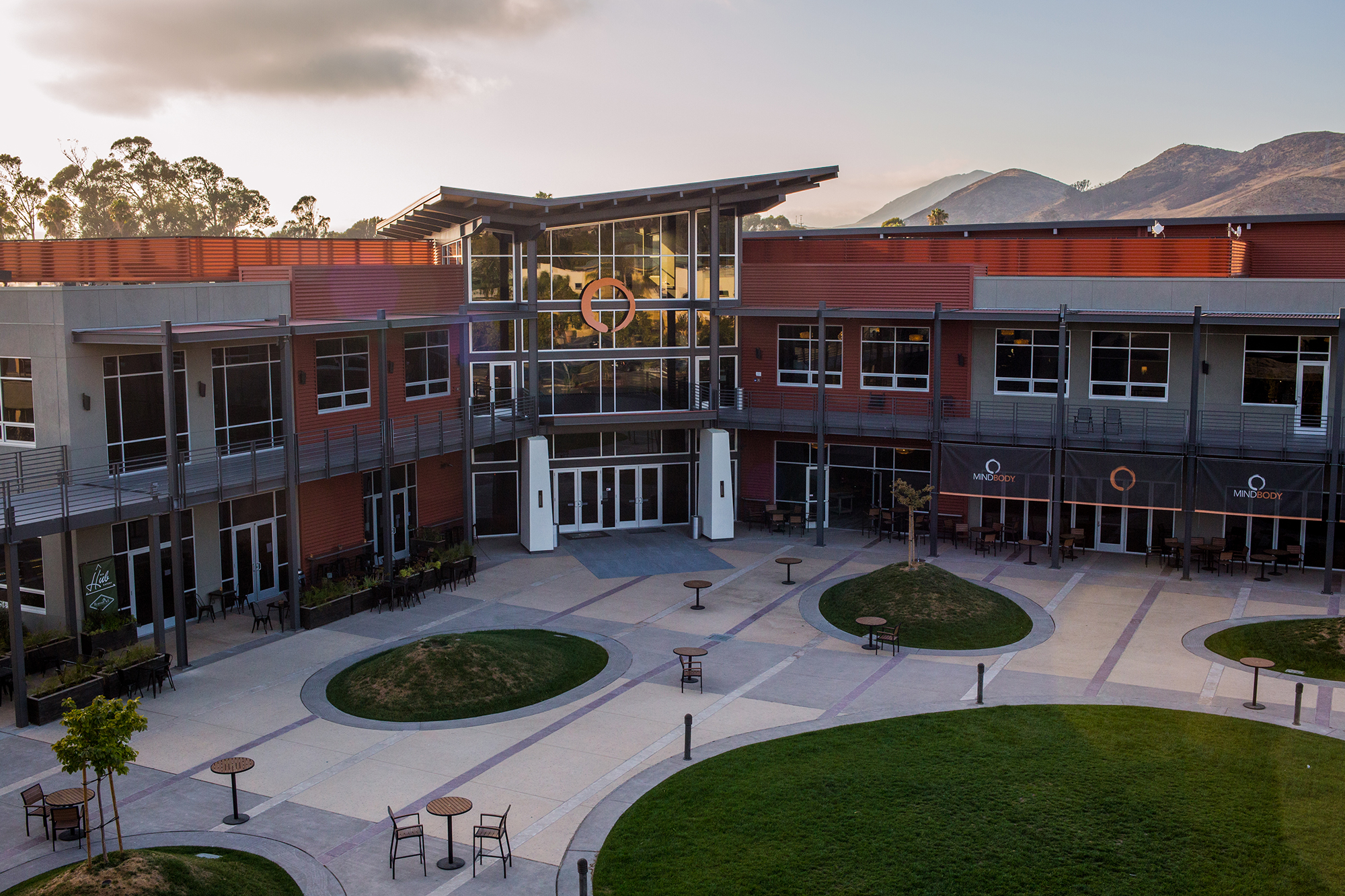
- Headquarters in San Luis Obispo, California
- Trade name: Mindbody
- Type: Private
- Industry: Software as a service Physical fitness
- Founded: 2001; 25 years ago
- Headquarters: 651 Tank Farm Road, San Luis Obispo, California, U.S.
- Area served: Worldwide
- Key people: Fritz Lanman (CEO)
- Owner: Vista Equity Partners
- Number of employees: 1,337 (2016)
- Subsidiaries: ClassPass
- Website: mindbodyonline.com

Mindbody, Inc. is a San Luis Obispo, California-based software-as-a-service company that provides cloud-based online scheduling and other business management software for the wellness services industry. The company has offices in the United States, United Kingdom, Australia and India. The workforce is distributed worldwide, with an ongoing remote work policy established in 2023.

Founded in 2000, it has been majority owned by Vista Equity Partners since 2019.

Since October 2021, the company has owned ClassPass.

The Mindbody mobile app is integrated with Fitbit and Under Armour’s MyFitnessPal.

== History ==
Mindbody was originally known as HardBody SoftWare. It began as a Sole Proprietorship in 1998 by Blake Beltram, and evolved into an LLC with Co-founder Rick Stollmeyer on February 13, 2001. Beltram exited and was effectively replaced as a major partner by Bob Murphy in 2003, who was then named Co-founder. The company was later incorporated as MINDBODY, Inc. In 2005, Mindbody Online was launched.

=== Financing ===
The company received its first financing round of US$1 million in November 2005 from Tech Coast Angels and Pasadena Angels.

In August 2010, it raised $11 million from Bessemer Venture Partners and Catalyst Investors.

It received another round of funding in November 2012 of US$35 million from Bessemer Venture Partners, Institutional Venture Partners, and Catalyst Investors.

In February 2014, Mindbody received its final round of private funding in the amount of US$50 million from Bessemer Venture Partners, Institutional Venture Partners, Catalyst Investors, W Capital Partners and Montreux Equity Partners.

In June 2015, the company became a public company via an initial public offering, raising $100 million.

In February 2019, the company was acquired by Vista Equity Partners for US$1.9 billion and taken private.

On October 13, 2021, Mindbody + Vista acquired a former competitor, ClassPass, whose CEO, Fritz Lanman, came onboard as President of Mindbody. Less than a year later, Josh McCarter resigned and Fritz Lanman became the new CEO on September 3, 2022. Lanman has stated that his goal is to prepare Mindbody + ClassPass for IPO through a series of improvements and upgrades to both platforms. "We are a story of two different businesses under one umbrella, both of which are growing, both of which are profitable, setting us up for an eventual IPO," CEO Fritz Lanman said.

=== Acquisitions ===
In 2010, Mindbody acquired ClientMagic.

In June 2013, Mindbody acquired Jill's List, a platform for Integrative Healthcare practitioners.

In February 2015, Mindbody acquired Fitness Mobile Apps.

In September 2016, Mindbody acquired HealCode, a technology company that designed web tools for the fitness and wellness industry.

In March 2017, Mindbody acquired Lymber Wellness.

In February 2018, the company acquired FitMetrix. In October 2018, the company exposed millions of user records due to its servers not having passwords.

In March 2018, the company acquired Booker Software for $150 million.

In 2019, the company acquired Bowtie.ai.

In September 2019, Mindbody acquired Simplicity First, a software consulting firm.

In May 2020, the company acquired ZeeZor, an analytics and staff platform for salon and spa businesses.

In October 2021, the company acquired ClassPass.
