= Vertical auto profile =

- Purpose: lipoprotein test

The Vertical Auto Profile (VAP) test is a blood analysis designed to accurately measure lipid and lipoprotein levels in the human body. While traditional lipid panels provide basic information about total cholesterol, HDL, LDL, and triglycerides, the VAP test offers a much more precise assessment of lipid subfractions, including various types of LDL, VLDL, and IDL cholesterol.

This test is especially useful in identifying cardiovascular risk factors that might not be detected through conventional analyses, thereby allowing for greater and more personalized prevention and treatment strategies.

== Description ==
The VAP test is an advanced analytical technique designed to identify cardiovascular risk factors not detected by traditional cholesterol tests. Its main advantage is its ability to measure and report more risk parameters, making it considerably more accurate, even in patients with elevated triglyceride levels. Unlike standard cholesterol tests, the VAP test does not require the patient to fast, which facilitates its use in everyday clinical settings.

A standout feature of the VAP test is its ability to assess 15 distinct components of the lipid profile, compared to the four parameters measured by traditional tests. This enables the detection of more than twice as many lipid abnormalities, particularly in individuals at high risk for cardiovascular disease. Among the components measured by the VAP test are the five classes of lipoproteins, including LDL, HDL, IDL, VLDL, and lipoprotein(a). Additionally, the test quantitatively defines the concentration of LDL-P particles, providing a more detailed view of lipid levels. These elements are critical for assessing more specific and personalized cardiovascular threats in high-risk patients.

The test aligns with the guidelines of the American Diabetes Association and the American College of Cardiology, which recommend a more comprehensive approach for patients at high risk for heart disease, such as those with type 2 diabetes. These guidelines include the measurement of apolipoprotein B and other parameters beyond LDL to more accurately assess cardiovascular risk.

== Studies ==
Various studies have supported the efficacy of the VAP test. A study of 1.34 million patients at Johns Hopkins showed that up to 60% of cases were misclassified when using the conventional lipid panel, potentially leading to inadequate or even harmful treatments. Other studies have highlighted the correlation between residual lipoproteins and cardiovascular risk, suggesting that the VAP test may be crucial for more accurate assessment and appropriate treatment in high-risk patients.
