= James Lanman =

American politician (1767–1841)

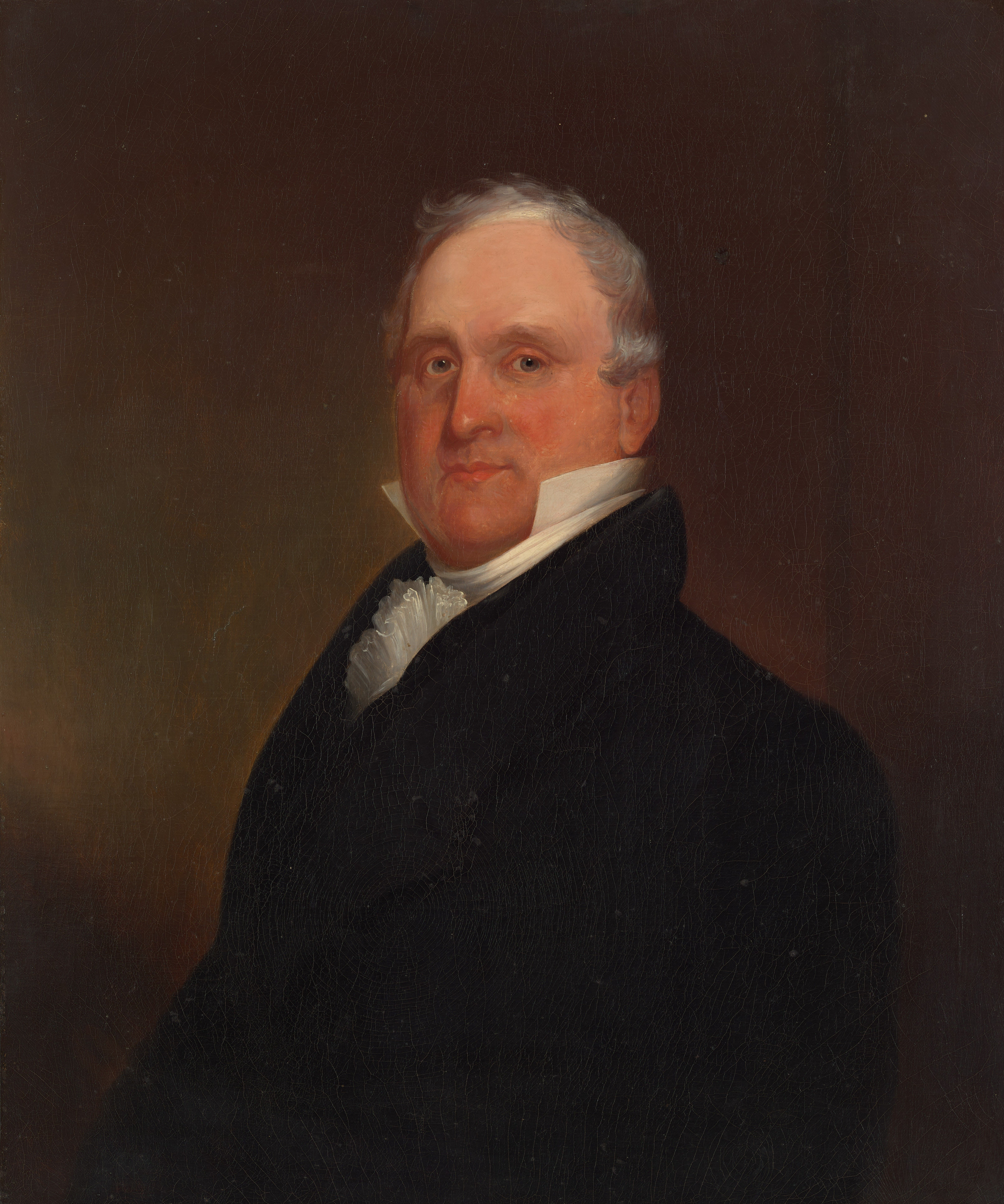
- Portrait of Lanman by Chester Harding (courtesy Yale University Art Gallery)
- In office March 4, 1819 – March 3, 1825
- Preceded by: David Daggett
- Succeeded by: Calvin Willey

Personal details
- Born: June 14, 1767 Norwich, Connecticut
- Died: August 7, 1841 (aged 74) Norwich, Connecticut, U.S.
- Party: Democratic-Republican, Crawford Republican
- Spouses: Marian Griswold Chandler (m. 1794; died 1817) Mary Judith Gall Benjamin (m. 1826)
- Relations: Charles Lanman (grandson)
- Children: 12, including Charles
- Education: Yale College
- Profession: Lawyer

James Lanman (June 14, 1767 – August 7, 1841) was an American lawyer and politician from Connecticut who served in the United States Senate from 1819 to 1825. He was a cousin of Presidents John Adams and John Quincy Adams.

== Early life ==
James Lanman was the eldest of the seven children of shipping magnate Peter Lanman of Norwich, Connecticut and Sarah Spaulding (née Coit) Lanman. The first of many generations of Lanmans who attended what is now known as Yale University, James Lanman pursued classical studies, debated as a member of Brothers in Unity and graduated Phi Beta Kappa from Yale College in 1788.

When his father died in 1804, James inherited and moved into his childhood home, the now historic "Peter Lanman House" on Main Street, for the rest of his life. A nearby tavern (now the Norwich Savings Society) at "Peter Lanman's Corner", at Main and Broadway in Norwich, is of interest because George Washington stayed there in 1775.

== Career ==
Lanman studied law and was admitted to the bar in 1791, beginning his practice in his hometown of Norwich "where he acquired great local distinction for his eloquence and general ability". We get an interesting glimpse of James Lanman as a young man of 20 through the diary of John Quincy Adams, who was two years his senior and rode with him on a stage from Boston to Providence on September 8, 1789: "I had two companions; one a Mr. Wright from North Carolina, and the other a young man from Connecticut by the name of Lanman. We were tolerably sociable. Lanman sung a number of songs of his own accord, and sung very well. But, upon being requested by Mr. Wright to continue, he altogether denied that he could sing at all."

=== Public office ===
He was elected to the State house of representatives in 1817, as a delegate to the State constitutional convention in 1818, then to the State senate in 1819. Lanman was elected to the United States Senate as a Democratic-Republican (later Crawford Republican) and served from March 4, 1819, to March 3, 1825. As a Senator he chaired the Committee to Audit and Control the Contingent Expenses (Seventeenth Congress), The Committee on Engrossed Bills (Seventeenth and Eighteenth Congresses), and the Committee on Post Office and Post Roads (Eighteenth Congress). Lanman was a judge of the State superior and supreme courts from 1826 to 1829 and the mayor of Norwich from 1831 to 1834 (to which his son Charles succeeded in 1838).

Lanman was known as the last Senator to wear a powdered wig, ruffled shirts and knee breeches. His grandson, Charles Lanman, private secretary to Daniel Webster, said that, "My grandfather, James Lanman, voted with the South on the Missouri Compromise and was burned in effigy in his native town, Norwich, but his broad patriotism won from him the warmest friendship of Henry Clay and Thomas H. Benton."

=== Notable orations ===
Lanman published a notable Fourth of July address to the citizens of Norwich on the 22nd anniversary of United States independence in 1798. While Mayor of Norwich, Lanman gave a speech commemorating the centennial anniversary of George Washington's birthday on March 1, 1832 entitled "A Discourse, Addressed to the Citizens of Norwich", which reviews Washington's military and civic contributions to the founding of the United States.

== Personal life ==
On May 18, 1794, Lanman was married to Marian Griswold Chandler (1774–1817), a daughter of the late Charles Church Chandler and Marian Griswold (a daughter of Governor Matthew Griswold). After her father's death, her mother remarried twice and among her half-siblings were Chief Justice Ebenezer Lane. Together, they had four sons and eight daughters, including:

- Charles James Lanman (1795–1870), who married Marie Jeanne Guie in 1819.
- Mary Anne Lanman (1797–1851), who married Obadiah Penniman in 1829, and Charles Waters.
- Eliza Lanman (1800–1872), who married Amos Hallam Hubbard in 1821.
- Sarah Coit Lanman (1802–1889), who married Josiah Harmar, son of Brig.-Gen. Josiah Harmar, in 1830.
- Harriet Lanman (1804–1853), who married Jacob Wyckoff Piatt of Cincinnati around 1832.
- Jane Griswold Lanman (1806–1874), who married Dr. Daniel Tyler Coit.
- Joanna Boylston Lanman (1808–1859), who married Lafayette S. Foster in 1837.

Widowed in 1817, Lanman married his second wife, Mary Judith (née Gall) Benjamin (1778–1848), on October 26, 1826. He had no children by his second marriage. From her first marriage to Parke Benjamin, she was mother to four, including Park Benjamin, who was a well known American poet, editor and founder of several newspapers.

Lanman died in Norwich, Connecticut on August 7, 1841, at age 75, and is interred in the City Cemetery.

== See also ==
- List of United States senators from Connecticut

U.S. Senate
Preceded by David Daggett	U.S. senator (Class 3) from Connecticut; 1819–1825; Served alongside: Samuel W. Dana, Elijah Boardman, Henry W. Edwards	Succeeded by Calvin Willey
