= Stuart Struever =

American anthropologist (1931–2022)

Stuart McKee Struever
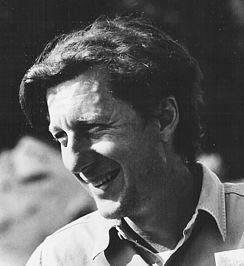
- Stuart Struever in the field
- Born: August 4, 1931; Peru, Illinois, United States
- Died: October 18, 2022 (aged 91); Santa Fe, New Mexico
- Education: Dartmouth College; University of Chicago
- Known for: New Archaeology, Woodland period Archaeology, Large scale Public-oriented Archaeology
- Awards: Distinguished Service Award (Society for American Archaeology, 1995); Presidential Service Award (Society for American Archaeology, 2003)
- Scientific career
- Fields: Anthropology, Archeology
- Workplaces: Northwestern University
- Doctoral advisor: Lewis Binford

Stuart McKee Struever (August 4, 1931 – October 18, 2022) was an American archaeologist and anthropologist – best known for his contributions to the archaeology of the Woodland Period in the US Midwest and for his leadership of archaeology research and education foundations. He was a professor of anthropology at Northwestern University.

== Early life and education ==
Struever was born in Peru, Illinois on August 4, 1931, the son of manager of the American Nickeloid Company. He attended Dartmouth College, majoring in English and graduating in 1953. His graduate work was done at the University of Chicago, where he pursued his interests in the Hopewell Tradition of the Middle Woodland period in the American midwest. He was a well-published researcher before he earned his PhD in 1968 under the supervision of Lewis Binford.

== Career ==
After completing his doctorate at the University of Chicago, Struever joined the Dept. of Anthropology at Northwestern University where he taught for most of his career and served as chairman from 1975 to 1978. Into the early 1970s he continued to be an active researcher, publishing on topics including settlement pattern, early agriculture, and trade. By the mid-1970s he had begun to focus mainly on leadership of the Foundation for Illinois Archeology (later renamed the Center for American Archeology or CAA), headquartered in Kampsville, Illinois. The CAA grew rapidly throughout the 1970s, converting many buildings in Kampsville into archaeology laboratories and offices.

With the CAA Struever developed the model of using archaeological education to generate funding to support a large multi-disciplinary archaeology research center. Education was provided mainly through numerous field schools, including a university-level field school operated in conjunction with Northwestern University and programs for high-schoolers and adults. The profile of the foundation was raised enormously with its large-scale excavation at the Koster Site in Greene County, Illinois. Initial research at this site was focused on Woodland period remains near the surface, but test pits encountered fourteen cultural levels or "horizons", dating back to the early Archaic period. Beginning in 1968, excavations at Koster expanded into one of the largest archaeological projects in the country by the mid-1970s. Several hundred college students worked at the site. It was featured in various national magazines and documentaries before excavations ended in 1979.

In the 1980s Struever retired from Northwestern and the CAA and moved to Colorado, becoming president of the Crow Canyon Archaeological Center in Cortez. Struever married Indian art dealer and scholar, Martha Hopkins Struever in 1988. He retired from Crow Canyon in 1992, and remained in Colorado.

Struever received a Distinguished Service Award in 1995, followed by a Presidential Recognition Award in 2003, from the Society for American Archaeology.

Dr. Struever eventually moved to Santa Fe and helped his wife Marti with her Indian art business, before she died in 2017. He was eventually moved to a senior assisted living home, where he died from COVID in 2022.

== Contributions ==
Struever is best known for accomplishments in three areas:

- The New Archaeology

Struever was a graduate student in the Dept. of Anthropology at University of Chicago when a sea change was occurring in anthropological archaeology; in a movement that came to be called the New Archaeology, the prevailing concern with prehistoric culture history was being replaced with more theoretical concerns about ancient societies (Willey and Sabloff 1974). The New Archaeology was spearheaded by Lewis Binford, who was Struever's dissertation advisor. Struever was an active and innovative contributor to this body of research, with publications such as "Woodland subsistence-settlement systems in the lower Illinois Valley" (Struever 1968a).

- Woodland Period Archaeology

Struever excavated several Woodland period sites in the Lower Illinois Valley and wrote extensively on this period in prehistory. His topics included culture history (Struever 1965), ancient agriculture (Struever and Vickery 1973), and methods of recovering small scale remains through flotation (Struever 1968b),

- Large-Scale, Public-Oriented Archaeology

Struever realized that the more intellectually ambitious questions being asked by the New Archaeology could not be answered without much broader and richer data on ancient life than archaeologists usually collected, including analyses of ancient plant and animal use, soils, and climate. He made this case in an important 1971 article (Struever 1971), and at the same time he was actively working to build the Center for Illinois Archeology into the sort of large-scale multi-disciplinary research program that he had advocated. Struever had in effect given up his career as a researcher within a few years, in order to devote his time to directing the CIA and later the Crow Canyon Archaeological Center. These centers both generated funding through field schools and a range of other educational programs.

A charismatic personality, Struever was an accomplished fund-raiser and spokesman for American archaeology during the 1970s and 1980s; he appeared in national media, wrote widely read books for the public (Struever and Holton 1979) and produced documentaries (Struever 1970).
