= Comparison of DVR software packages =

This is a comparison of digital video recorder (DVR), also known as personal video recorder (PVR), software packages.

Note: this is may be considered a comparison of DVB software, not all listed packages have recording capabilities.

== General information ==
Basic general information for popular DVR software packages - not all actually record.

| Name | Windows | MacOSX | Linux | BSD | Android | Price | License | Latest stable release | Notes |
|---|---|---|---|---|---|---|---|---|---|
| Beyond TV | Yes | No | No | No | No | Discontinued | Proprietary | 4.9.3 (Build 6535); October 15, 2010; 16 years ago | Not compatible with DVB tuners. While Snapstream is providing minor fixes for Beyond TV, they are no longer actively updating and developing the software as they are focusing on commercial applications. Despite the lack of a new version, their fanbase (in the forums) remains active and the program is still available. Further information: List of digital television deployments by country |
| DVB Dream | Yes | No | No | No | No | US$49 | Proprietary | 3.7.1; March 14, 2019; 7 years ago | Focused on DVB and live TV |
| DVBViewer | Yes | No | No | No | No | €20 | Proprietary | 6.1.5; July 22, 2019; 7 years ago | |
| Emby (formerly Media Browser) | Yes | Yes | Yes | Yes | Yes (client only) | Crippleware (Note: Emby Server is available for free under GPL which provides web access to the library. Client software is generally free when connected to an Emby Premiere-licensed server, though some, like Emby on the Windows Store, cost $4.99.) (Note: Premiere license costs $4.99/month, $49.99/year, or $99.99 for lifetime.) | GPL & Proprietary | 4.6.7.0; November 21, 2021; 4 years ago | Compatible with SiliconDust HDHomeRun tuners. |
| EyeTV | No | Yes | No | No | No | Bundled | Proprietary | 3.6.9 (build 7521); January 10, 2017; 9 years ago | Bundled for no extra charge with all Elgato USB tuners, but also sold separately for use with other tuners. |
| Hauppauge WinTV | Yes | No | No | No | No | Bundled | Proprietary | 8.5 (build 37122); May 2, 2019; 7 years ago | Bundled for no extra charge, only works with Hauppauge TV cards and peripherals. |
| InterVideo WinDVR | Yes | No | No | No | No | Discontinued | Proprietary | 5.2; March 29, 2010; 16 years ago | Discontinued. Used to be bundled for no extra charge with various TV tuner devices. |
| Jellyfin | Yes | Yes | Yes | Yes (unofficially) | Yes (client only) | Free | GPL | 10.10.7; April 5, 2025; 19 months ago | |
| JRiver Media Center | Yes | Yes | Yes | No | Yes | US$59.98 (multiple installations) | Proprietary | 29.0.22; March 22, 2022; 4 years ago | DirectShow video player, madVR, LAV filters, HD audio, images, 10 foot GUI, Remote control, DLNA, Android/iPhone interface, automatic meta-data lookup for Audio, TV and Movies, fully customizable database |
| Kodi (formerly XBMC) | Yes | Yes | Yes | Yes | Yes | Free | GPL | 21.0 "Omega"; April 6, 2024; 2 years ago | Cross-platform free and open-source software media center application, able to watch live or recorded TV, music, photos and has one of the most expansive collection of plugins/addons, enabling the system to do anything from browsing the web or downloading movies, to dimming the lights in the sitting room. |
| MediaPortal | Yes | No | No | No | No | Free | GPL | MP1: 1.23; October 4, 2019; 7 years ago MP2: 2.2.2; October 7, 2019; 7 years ago | built on the .NET 2.0 Framework |
| MythTV | Limited (Note: Porting MythTV to Windows is under development.) | Yes | Yes | Yes | Yes (client only) | Free | GPL | 36.0; February 10, 2026; 8 months ago | Under heavy development since 2002, and now contains most features one would expect from a good DVR. |
| NextPVR | Yes | Yes | Yes | Yes | Yes (client only) | Free | Proprietary | 6.1.5.231022; October 22, 2023; 3 years ago | Personal video recorder application for Microsoft Windows, Linux, Mac and Docker. Supports a wide variety of devices, and a good set of features. Free for personal use. Commercial use requires a license. |
| SageTV | Yes (Note: There is also a Windows Home Server Edition) | Yes | Yes | No | Yes (client only) | Free (was US$79.95/server, US$29.95/client) | GPL (was Proprietary) | v9.2.16 December 2, 2025 | Java based. SageTV was purchased by Google on June 20, 2011, and on August 10, 2015, it was announced that the project was converting to open-source development. |
| Showshifter | Yes | No | No | No | No | Discontinued (was £30) | Proprietary | 3.12.2945; May 14, 2005; 21 years ago | Supports some older TechnoTrend/Hauppauge boxes which are not BDA compliant, such as the Dec 2000-t/3000-s and first generation Nova-t USB boxes, which are unsupported by other PVR software. |
| tvtime | No | No | Yes | No | No | Free | GPL | 1.0.2; November 10, 2005; 20 years ago | High quality television application for use with video capture cards on Linux systems. tvtime processes the input from a capture card and displays it on a computer monitor or projector |
| Video Disk Recorder | No | No | Yes | Yes | No | Free | GPL | 2.4.1; June 17, 2019; 7 years ago | TV Done Right, VDR can use one to eight video cards and support DVB-S, DVB-C and DVB-T. Record and read any DVB flux with a lot of plugins. |
| Windows Media Center | Yes | No | No | No | No | Windows 8/8.1: US$69.99; Windows 8/8.1 Pro: US$9.99; Windows XP/Vista/7: Free | Proprietary | 6.3.9600.16384; February 23, 2011; 15 years ago | Included with Windows XP Media Center Edition, Windows Vista Home Premium and Ultimate editions and Windows 7 Home Premium, Professional, and Ultimate editions. Was available for Windows 8 Pro and Windows 8.1 Pro as part of the Media Center Pack add-on, until it was discontinued on October 30, 2015. Available for Windows 8, Windows 8.1 and Windows 10 unofficially through a windows command script installer. Not available for Windows RT. |
| V@Home | Yes | Yes (Note: Manage and schedule recordings) | Yes | No | No | Bundled | Proprietary | 2.59; April 14, 2018; 8 years ago | Bundled for no extra charge with VBox Home TV Gateway - Network TV Tuner, Manage and schedule recordings from any web browser, local or over the internet |
| Name | Windows | MacOSX | Linux | BSD | Android | Price | License | Latest stable release | Notes |

== Features ==
Information about what common and prominent DVR features are implemented natively (without third-party add-ons unless stated otherwise):

| DVR | Subscription free electronic program guide (EPG) | Power management | Multiple TV tuner cards support | CableCARD support | CAM support | ATSC tuner support | Automated commercial skipping | Teletext | Schedule timed recordings | Personalized intelligent recording and scheduling (Note: A system similar to TiVo's which enables the DVR/PVR application to record programs based on past viewing habits and interests.) | DRM support | DVB (T/T2, S/S2, C) tuner support | Smartphone /tablet playback | Smartphone /tablet syncing | Smartphone /tablet remote control |
|---|---|---|---|---|---|---|---|---|---|---|---|---|---|---|---|
| Beyond TV | Yes | Yes (Note: To take advantage of operating system power management with Beyond TV, the main user interface must be closed.) | Yes | No | ? | Yes | Yes | No | Yes | Yes | No | No | ? | ? | ? |
| EyeTV | DVB; (Note: Supports over-the-air EPG when using cards/boxes which support this functionality, and in areas where such a service is available. For example, over-the-air 7-day programme data is available in the UK for DVB-T services (Freeview, TopUp TV etc; DVB-T2 listings for Freeview HD are encrypted) and Freesat (DVB-S/S2). (Note: Unlike the UK DVB-T EPG, the Freesat EPG uses its own channel and thus must be specifically set up in order to be used. Consequently support for DVB EPG may be insufficient to access it.)) other guide info varies by region (Note: Elgato's contract with TitanTV for the US market expired in 2010. When it expired, TV Guide became the sole EPG provider for EyeTV in the United States. There, one year of TV Guide EPG service costs $19.95.) | Yes | Yes | No | ? | Yes | External add-on | Yes | Yes | Yes | Yes | Yes | ? | ? | ? |
| WinTV | Yes | Yes | Yes | Limited (Note: Support is limited to content broadcast as 'copy freely' (DRM Free)) | ? | Yes | No | Yes | Yes | Yes | No | Yes | Yes | ? | ? |
| Kodi (formerly XBMC) | Yes | Yes | External add-on | External add-on | External add-on | External add-on | Yes | External add-on | External add-on | External add-on | External add-on | External add-on | Using Plugin | Using Plugin | Using Apps |
| NextPVR | Yes (Note: Natively supports broadcast EPG. Able to use alternative EPG, like XMLTV and Schedules Direct in countries that don't provide a decent broadcast EPG.) | Yes | Yes | Partial (Note: Support is limited to content broadcast as 'copy freely' (DRM Free)) | Yes | Yes | Yes | Yes | Yes | Yes | Unknown | Yes | Yes | ? | ? |
| MediaPortal | DVB/XMLTV (Note: Supports XMLTV programme data which is provided by various sources for various costs depending on territory. For example, the (supported) 14-day Radio Times feed for the UK is free of charge.) | Yes | Yes | Partial (Note: Version 1.5.0 or higher required - only 'Copy Freely' support - No Encrypted 'Copy Once' support) | Supported on some specific cards | Yes | Using Plugin | Yes | Yes | Yes | Partial support | Yes | Yes (Note: via aMPdroid app; requires WifiRemote and MpExtended plugins) | ? | Yes |
| MediaPhoenix /ShowShifter | DVB | Unknown | Yes | No | ? | Unknown | No | No | Yes | Yes | Unknown | Yes | No | No | No |
| MythTV | DVB; other services region dependent (Note: Subscription-free EPG is available in areas where program listings data is freely available without violating copyright laws or data owners' Terms of Service. In North America, Schedules Direct provides legally-licensed EPG data for a nominal fee of $25 per year.) | Yes | Yes | Limited (Note: Support is limited to content broadcast as 'copy freely' (DRM Free)) | Yes (Note: Supports hardware-based CAMs supported by LinuxTV framework.) | Yes | Yes | Yes | Yes | Requires external add-on (Note: External third-party plug-in required, e.g. "tvwish", "MythMiner"; not supported.) | No | Yes (Note: Supports any tuner card supported by LinuxTV framework.) | Yes | No | Yes (Note: The official MythTV plugin MythWeb allows users to browse the programme guide, schedule recordings, manage media and playback video via a Flash-based player, which works on Android phones and tablets.) |
| SageTV | Yes (with former purchased license) | Yes | Yes | Partial Using Plugin (Note: Support is limited to content broadcast as 'copy freely' (DRM Free) - Smartphone and tablet control of the full range of Windows Media Center features is possible on iOS and Android.) | ? | Yes | Using Plugin (Note: Supported by 3rd party plugins: ComSkip and ShowAnalyzer) | No | Yes | Yes | No | ? | ? | ? | ? |
| Video Disk Recorder | Yes | Yes | Yes | No | Yes | Yes | No | Using Plugin | Yes | Using Plugin | No | Yes | Using Plugin | No | Using Plugin |
| Windows Media Center | Yes | Yes | Yes (Note: Windows Media Center supports two NTSC (Analog) tuners and two ATSC (Digital) tuners out of the box. Using additional tuners requires registry modifications. Windows 7 Media Center supports up to 4 tuners of each type out of the box, DVB-T, DVB-S, NTSC/PAL.) | Yes (Note: Windows Media Center supports CableCard when used on CableLabs certified OEM Hardware. Windows 7 Media Center supports CableCard on any hardware that passes the Digital Cable Advisor tool in MCE.) | ? | Yes | External add-on (Note: Requires an external plug-in such as "DVRMSToolbox", "Lifextender" or "MCEBuddy"; not supported by Microsoft.) | Yes | Yes | Yes (Note: Vista Media Center can do partial intelligent recordings based on keywords, actor(s) name(s), or genre.) | Yes; also respects "do not record" flag | Supports DVB-T/T2 and DVB-S/S2; does not support DVB-C (Note: DVB-C is achievable using certain cards that are detected as DVB-T tuners. And also using addons such as DVBLink) | Yes | Yes | Yes |
| VBox@TV | DVB Guide info varies by broadcaster and TV service provider | No | Yes | No | Yes | Yes | ? | Yes | Yes | Yes | ? | Yes | Yes | Yes | Yes |

== Video format support ==
Information about what video codecs are implemented natively (without third-party add-ons) in the PVRs.

| DVR | MPEG-1 | MPEG-2 | MPEG-4 ASP (MPEG-4 Part 2), i.e. DivX, XviD | H.264/MPEG-4 AVC (MPEG-4 Part 10) | HEVC (H.265) | VP8 | VP9 | WMV | AVI | ASF | QuickTime | MP4 | RealVideo | MKV |
|---|---|---|---|---|---|---|---|---|---|---|---|---|---|---|
| Beyond TV | Yes | Yes | Yes | Yes | Unknown | Unknown | Unknown | Yes | Yes | Unknown | No | No | No | Unknown |
| EyeTV | Yes | Yes | Unknown | Yes | Unknown | Unknown | Unknown | Unknown | Unknown | Unknown | Yes | Unknown | Unknown | Unknown |
| WinTV | Unknown | Yes | Yes | Yes | Unknown | Unknown | Unknown | Unknown | Yes | Unknown | Unknown | Yes | Unknown | Unknown |
| NextPVR | Unknown | Yes | Yes | Yes | Unknown | Unknown | Unknown | Unknown | Yes | Unknown | Unknown | Yes | Unknown | Unknown |
| Kodi (formerly XBMC) | Yes | Yes | Yes | Yes | Yes | Yes | Yes | Yes | Yes | Yes | Yes | Yes | Yes | Yes |
| MediaPortal | Yes | Yes | Yes | Yes | Unknown | Unknown | Unknown | Yes | Yes | Yes | No (Note: Possible with third-party software.) | Yes | No | Yes |
| MediaPhoenix /ShowShifter | Unknown | Unknown | Unknown | Unknown | Unknown | Unknown | Unknown | Unknown | Unknown | Unknown | Unknown | Unknown | Unknown | Unknown |
| MythTV | Yes | Yes | Yes | Yes | Yes | Yes | Yes | Yes | Yes | Yes | Yes | Yes | Yes | Yes |
| SageTV | Yes | Yes | Yes | Yes | Unknown | Unknown | Unknown | Yes | Yes | Yes | Yes | Yes | Unknown | Yes |
| Arcsoft TotalMedia Theatre | Yes | Yes | Yes | Yes | Unknown | No | Unknown | Yes | Yes | Yes | Yes | Yes | Yes | Unknown |
| Windows Media Center | Yes | Yes | Yes | Yes (Note: Windows 7 only) | Unknown | Unknown | Unknown | Yes | Yes | Yes | Yes | Yes | No | Unknown |
| VBox@TV | Yes | Yes | Yes | Yes | Unknown | Unknown | Unknown | Unknown | Yes | Unknown | Unknown | Unknown | Unknown | Unknown |

== Network support ==
Each features is in context of computer-to-computer interaction. All features must be available after the default install otherwise the feature needs a footnote.

| DVR | Tuner Sharing | Hard Disk Pooling | Shared Media Database | Home Automation | Media Extenders | Placeshifting/Spaceshifting | Two-way Remote Control | Second Screen |
|---|---|---|---|---|---|---|---|---|
| Beyond TV | Yes | Yes | No | No | Yes | Yes | No | Unknown |
| EyeTV | Unknown | Unknown | Yes | Unknown | Unknown | Yes | Unknown | Unknown |
| NextPVR | Yes | Unknown | Unknown | Unknown | Unknown | Unknown | Unknown | Unknown |
| Kodi (formerly XBMC) | Yes | Yes | Yes | Yes^{4} | Yes | Unknown | Yes^{3} | Unknown |
| MediaPortal | Yes | Yes | Yes | Yes | Yes | Yes | Yes^{4} | Unknown |
| MediaPhoenix/ShowShifter | Unknown | Unknown | Unknown | Unknown | Unknown | Unknown | Unknown | Unknown |
| MythTV | Yes | Yes | Yes | Yes^{3} | Yes | Yes | Yes | Unknown |
| SageTV | Yes | Yes | Unknown | Unknown | Yes | Yes | Unknown | Unknown |
| Arcsoft TotalMedia Theatre | Yes | Yes | Yes | No | Yes | Yes | No | Unknown |
| Windows Media Center | Yes^{6} | Yes^{7} | Yes | Yes^{2} | Yes | Yes^{5} | Yes^{2} | Unknown |
| VBox@TV | Yes | Unknown | Yes | Unknown | Unknown | Yes | Yes | Unknown |

^{1} Yes with registry change
^{2} Yes with retail third-party plugin
^{3} Yes with free supported third-party plugin
^{4} Yes with free unsupported third-party plugin
^{5} Yes with free third-party software Web Guide 4
^{6} Yes with add-on software called DVBLink Server
^{7} Yes with using symlinks, or just adding folders in settings

== TV tuner hardware ==
TV gateway network tuner TV servers
DVRs require TV tuner cards to receive signals. Many DVRs, as seen above, can use multiple tuners.

HdHomerun has CableCARD Models (HDHomeRun Prime) and OTA Models (HDHomeRun Connect) that are networked TV Tuners

== See also ==
- List of free television software
- Comparison of video player software
- Home cinema
- Home theater PC (HTPC)
- Digital video recorder
- Hard disk recorder
- DVD recorder
- Quiet PC
- Media server
