= Hauppauge Computer Works =

Company focusing on computer software

- Industry: Electronics
- Founded: 1982; 44 years ago Hauppauge, New York, U.S.
- Founders: Kenneth Plotkin; Kenneth Aupperle
- Headquarters: Hauppauge, New York, U.S.
- Website: hauppauge.com

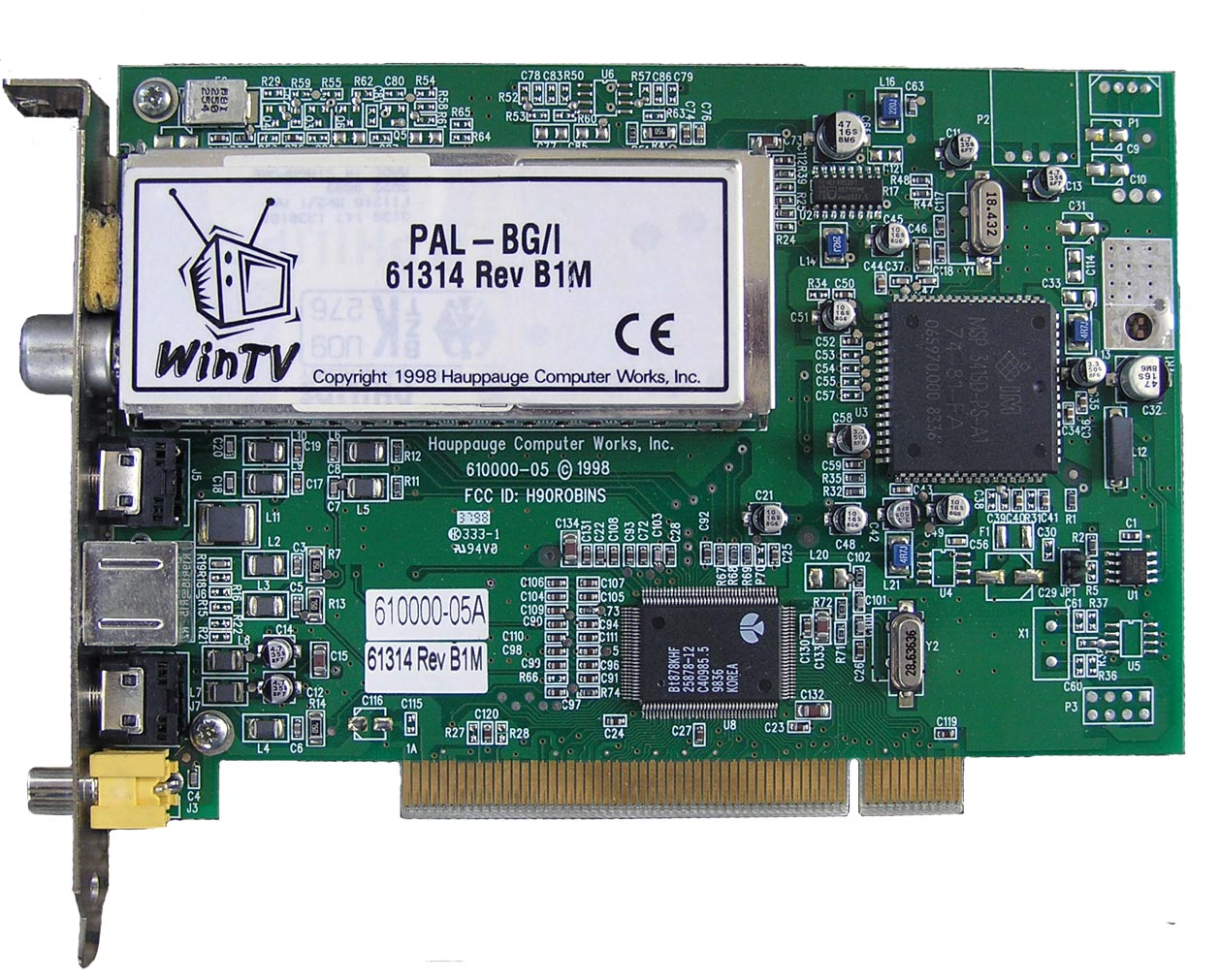
Hauppauge WinTV GO TV Analog TV tuner card

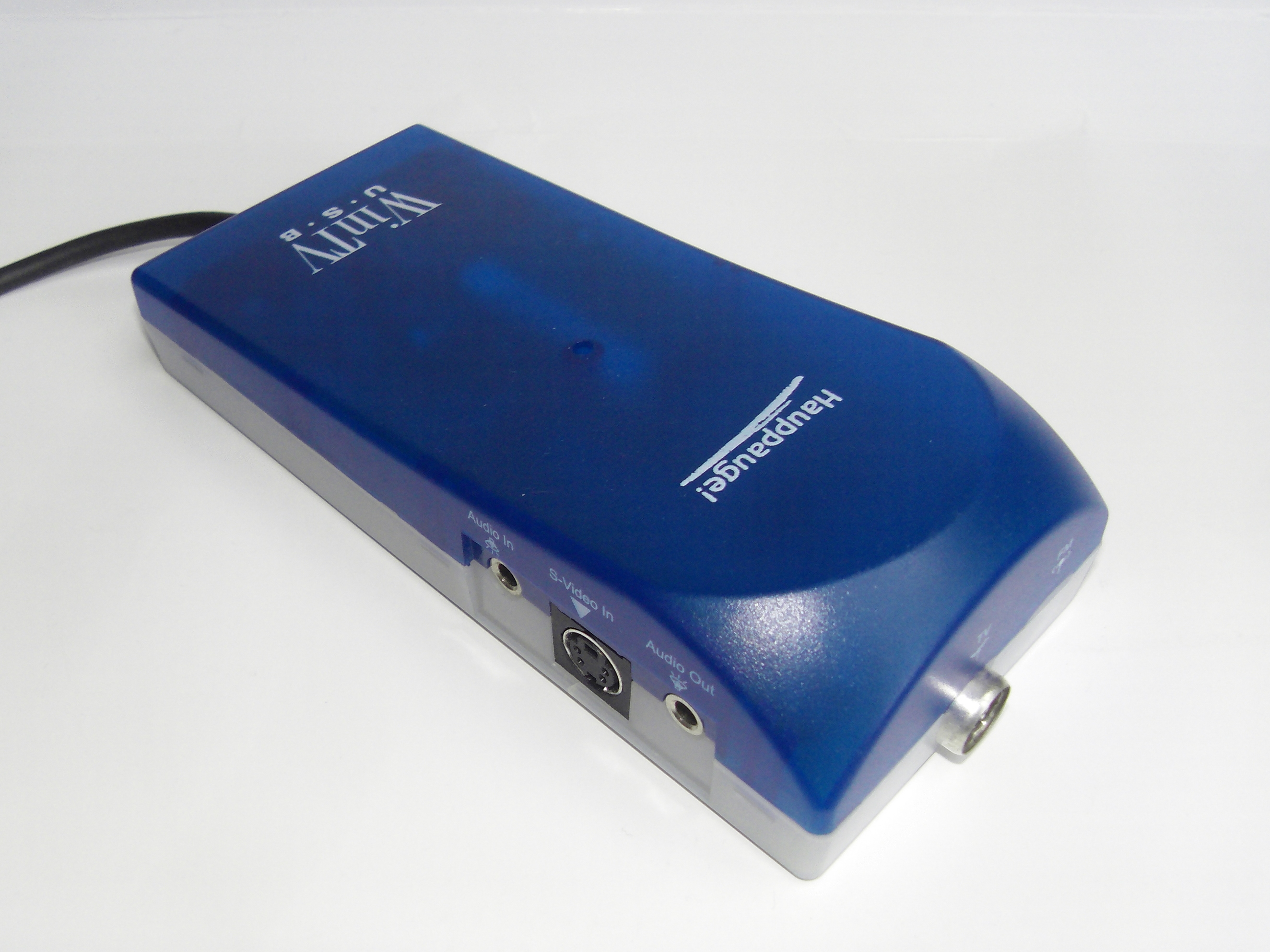
WinTV USB, TV Analog

Hauppauge Computer Works (/ˈhɔːpɒɡ/ HAWP-og) is a US manufacturer and marketer of electronic video hardware for personal computers. Although it is most widely known for its WinTV line of TV tuner cards for PCs, Hauppauge also produces personal video recorders, digital video editors, digital media players, hybrid video recorders and digital television products for both Windows and Mac. The company is named after the hamlet of Hauppauge, New York, in which it is based.

In addition to its headquarters in New York, Hauppauge also has sales and technical support offices in France, Germany, the Netherlands, Sweden, Italy, Poland, Australia, Japan, Singapore, Indonesia, Taiwan, Spain, and the United Kingdom.

== Company history ==
Hauppauge was co-founded by Kenneth Plotkin and Kenneth Aupperle, and became incorporated in 1982.

Starting in 1983, the company followed Microway, the company that a year earlier provided the software needed by scientists and engineers to modify the IBM PC Fortran compiler so that it could transparently employ Intel 8087 coprocessors. The 80-bit Intel 8087 math coprocessor ran a factor of 50 faster than the 8/16-bit 8088 CPU that the IBM PC software came with. However, in 1982, the speed-up in floating-point-intensive applications was only a factor of 10 as the initial software developed by Microway and Hauppauge continued to call floating point libraries to do computations instead of placing inline x87 instructions inline with the 8088's instructions that allowed the 8088 to drive the 8087 directly. By 1984, inline compilers made their way into the market providing increased speed ups. Hauppauge provided similar software products in competition with Microway that they bundled with math coprocessors and remained in the Intel math coprocessor business until 1993 when the Intel Pentium came out with a built-in math coprocessor. However, like other companies that entered the math coprocessor business, Hauppauge produced other products that contributed to a field that is today called HPC - high-performance computing.

The math coprocessor business rapidly expanded starting in 1984 with software products that accelerated applications like Lotus 1-2-3. At the same time the advent of the 80286 based IBM PC/AT with its 80287 math coprocessor provided new opportunities for companies that had grown up selling 8087s and supporting software. This included products like Hauppauge's 287 Fast/5, a product that took advantage of the 80287's design that used an asynchronous clock to drive its FPU at 5 MHz instead of the 4 MHz clocking provided by IBM, making it possible for the 80287s that came with the AT to be overclocked to 12 MHz.

By 1987, math coprocessors had become Intel's most profitable product line bringing in competition from vendors like Cyrix whose first product was a math coprocessor faster than the new Intel 80387, but whose speed was stalled by the 80386 that acted as a governor. This is when Andy Grove decided it was time for Intel to recapture its channel to market opening up a division to compete with its math coprocessor customers that by this time included 47th Street Camera. The new Intel division, PCEO (the PC Enhancement Operation) came out with a product called "Genuine Intel Math Coprocessors". After playing around in the accelerator board business PCEO would settle down in the 80386 motherboard business originally selling a motherboard designed by one of its engineers as a home project that eventually ended up with a new division that today sells 40% of the motherboards used in high end PCs that find their way into products including Supercomputers, medical products, etc.

Companies like Hauppauge and Microway that were impacted by their new competitor that made their living accelerating floating point applications being run on PCs followed suit by venturing into the Intel i860 vector coprocessor business: Hauppauge came out with an Intel 80486 motherboard that included an Intel i860 vector processor while Microway came out with add-in cards that had between one or more i860s. These products along with transputer-based add-in cards would eventually lead into what became known as HPC (high performance computing). HPC was actually initiated in 1986 by an English company, Inmos, that designed a CPU competitive with an Intel 80386/387 that also included four twisted pair high-speed interconnects that could communicate with other transputers and be linked to a PC motherboard making it possible to create distributed memory processing computers that could employ 32 processors with the same throughput as 32 Intel 386/387s operating in a single PC. The add-in card parallel processing business morphed from the transputer to the Intel i860 around 1989 when Inmos was purchased by STMicroelectronics that cut R&D funding eventually forcing companies that had entered the parallel processing business to shift to the Intel i860. The i860 was a vector processor with graphics extensions that could initially provide 50 megaflops of throughput in an era when an 80486 with an Intel 80487 peaked at half a megaflop and would eventually top out at 100 Megaflops making it as fast as 100 Inmos T414 transputers. Intel i860 add-in cards made it possible for as many as 20 Intel i860s to run in parallel and could be programmed using a software library similar to today's MPI libraries which today support distributed memory parallel processing in which servers sitting in 1U rack mount chassis that are essentially PCs provide the horsepower behind the majority of the world's supercomputers. This same approach could be employed using Hauppauge's motherboards connected by Gigabit Ethernet, something that was however first demonstrated using a wall of IBM RS/6000 PCs at the 1991 Supercomputing Conference. IBM's lead was quickly followed by academic users who realized they could do the same thing with much less expensive hardware by adapting their x86 PCs to run in parallel at first using a software library adapted from similar transputer libraries called PVM (parallel virtual machines) that would eventually morph into today's MPI. Products like the Intel i860 vector processor that could be employed both as a vector and graphics processor were end of life'd around 1993 at the same time that Intel introduced the Intel Pentium P5: a CISC processor that used CISC instructions that were pipelined into hard coded lower level RISC like primitives that provided the Pentium with a Superscalar architecture that also could execute the x87 FPU instruction set using a built in FPU that was essentially implemented using the scalar instructions of the i860 as well as a memory bus that provided a 400 MB/sec interface to memory that was borrowed from the i860 as well. This high speed bus played a crucial role in speeding up the most common floating point intensive applications that at this point in time used Gauss Elimination to solve simultaneous linear equations buy which today are solved using blocking and LU decomposition. The Intel Pentium, while good, did not provide enough floating point performance to compete with a 300 MHz DEC Alpha 21164 that provided 600 Megaflops in 1995. At the same point in time, Intel supercomputing had moved from the 50 MHz Intel i860XP that was six times slower than the Alpha 21164 to the special version of their Pentium that at 200 megaflops was only three times slower than the 21164. However, the impending speed upgrade of the Alpha to 600 MHz ultimately doomed the future of Intel supercomputing.

=== Motherboards ===
During the late 1980s and early 1990s, Hauppauge produced motherboards for Intel 486 processors. A number of these motherboards were standard ISA built to fairly competitive price points. Some, however, were workstation and server-oriented, including EISA support, optional cache memory modules, and support for the Weitek 4167 FPU.

Hauppauge also sold a unique motherboard, the Hauppauge 4860. This was the only standard PC/AT motherboard ever made with both an Intel 80486 and an Intel i860 processor (optional). While both required the 80486, the i860 could either run an independent lightweight operating system or serve as a more conventional co-processor.

Hauppauge no longer produces motherboards, focusing instead on the TV card market.

== Product lines ==
=== Digital Terrestrial/Satellite ===
Hauppauge digital terrestrial and satellite products capture DVB-T and DVB-S broadcasts respectively without the need to re-encode the streams. There are several benefits from this approach:

- the cost of the TV card can be lower because there is no need to supply an MPEG-2 encoder
- the quality of captures can be higher because there is no need to re-encode streams
- ratio of file size to quality is higher due to the broadcasters' high-efficiency encoders

Until August 2004 all of Hauppauge's DVB products were badge-engineered TechnoTrend products. The first of the new Hauppauge-designed cards was the Nova-t PCI 90002 and the silent replacement of the TechnoTrend model caused confusion and anger among Hauppauge's customers who found that the new card didn't support TechnoTrend's proprietary interfaces. This rendered any existing third-party software unusable with the new cards. The new cards also came with a software packaged called WinTV2000 which lacked features that TechnoTrend's software had including seven-day EPG, Digital Teletext and LCN-based channel ordering. The new cards supported Microsoft's BDA standard but at the time this was at its infancy and very few 3rd party applications included support for it.

By 2005, all of the TechnoTrend products had been removed from the Hauppauge lineup, with the exception of the DEC2000-t and DEC3000-s which haven't seen a replacement.

=== Hybrid Video Recorders ===
The Hybrid Video Recorder (HVR) range capture a combination of different broadcast types. The majority of Hauppauge HVR models capture analogue PAL and DVB-T but there have been some more recent models which capture analogue NTSC and ATSC as well as a tri-mode card which supports analogue PAL, DVB-S and DVB-T.

HVR-9xx devices are bus-powered USB 2.0 sticks, not much larger than a USB flash drive. They have support for analogue and digital terrestrial TV. The HVR-9xx sticks are produced in Taiwan by Deltron, and are also sold for Apple computers by Elgato under the EyeTV brand.

HVR-1xxx devices are PCI-based products that receive analogue and digital terrestrial TV. They are similar to the HVR-9xx but have support for NICAM or dbx Stereo for analogue terrestrial on all models.

HVR-3xxx and 4xxx devices are tri-mode and quad-mode devices respectively. Tri-mode means support for analogue terrestrial/cable, digital terrestrial and DVB-S digital satellite. Quad-mode devices additionally support DVB-S2 HD digital satellite. The HVR-4000 marks a change in bundled applications in that instead of using Hauppauge's WinTV2000 package, it ships with Cyberlink PowerCinema.

=== Personal Video Recorders ===
The Personal Video Recorder (PVR) range uses an on-board MPEG/MPEG-2 encoder to compress the incoming analogue TV signals. The benefits of using a hardware encoder include lower CPU usage when encoding live TV.

The first WinTV-PVR product was the WinTV PVR-PCI, launched in late 2000 and not receiving any driver updates since February 2002. It was joined by the WinTV PVR-USB, which has two variants. The first variant supported MPEG-2 streams up to 6 Mbit/s and supported Half-D1 resolutions (320 × 480). This was replaced by an updated model supporting up to 12 Mbit/s streams and Full-D1 resolution (720 × 480).

The first WinTV-PVR to gain popularity was the PVR-250. The original version of the PVR-250 was a variant of the Sag Harbor (PVR-350) which used the ivac15 chipset. Although the chipset was able to do hardware decoding the video out components were not included on the card. In later versions of the PVR-250 the ivac15 was replaced with the ivac16 to reduce cost and to relieve heat issues. The PVR-250 and PVR-350 were joined by the USB 2.0 PVR-USB2 to complete their generation of devices.

Their successors, the PVR-150 and PVR-500, were released alongside the PVR-250/350/USB2 and while popular with both OEMs and the general public, there have been numerous driver issues as well as video quality complaints. The PVR-500 was released as a Media Center card and wasn't supplied with Hauppauge's WinTV2000 software. It was effectively two PVR-150s on a single board, connected via a PCI-PCI bridge chip. The PVR-USB2 was silently replaced with the PVR-USB2+ which is identical both visually and terms of features, but uses a Conexant chipset rather than the Philips chipset in the old model.

From its name and time of release, the PVR-160 appears to be newer than the PVR-150 but it is not. The PVR-160 is a repackaging of the WinTV Roslyn. The Roslyn is based on the Conexant Blackbird design and uses the CX2388x video decoder. This board was originally available only to OEMs and third-party software vendors such as Frey Technologies (SageTV) and Snapstream (BeyondTV). The board was sold under many names including the PVR-250BTV (Snapstream). This card is known to have color and brightness issues that can be corrected somewhat using registry hacks. Hauppauge received a large surplus amount of these cards from OEM and third-party vendors. The cards were repackaged with an MCE remote and receiver and rebranded the PVR-160. The PVR-160 was often mistakenly referred to as the PVR-250MCE but is not related to the PVR-250.

=== High-Definition Personal Video Recorder ===
In May 2008, Hauppauge released the HD-PVR, a USB 2.0 device with an on-board H.264 hardware encoder for recording from high-definition sources through component inputs. It is the world's first USB device that can capture in high definition. The HD-PVR has proved to be a very popular device, and Hauppauge has been updating its drivers and software continually since its release. In addition to being able to capture from any component video source in 480p, 720p, or 1080i, the HD-PVR comes with an IR blaster that communicates with your cable or satellite set-top box for automated program recordings and channel-changing capabilities. In 2012, Hauppauge released the HD-PVR Gaming Edition 2, which features a much smaller design than its predecessor along with 1080p HDMI support. The PVR is not officially supported on Macintosh systems, but a variety of third-party programs exist that allow it to function on OS X, including EyeTV by Elgato and HDPVRCapture. In 2013, Hauppauge released an upgrade for the existing HD-PVR 2 with the HD-PVR 2 Gaming Edition Plus, which supports Macintosh systems.

=== WinTV Analogue ===
The standard analogue range of products use software encoding for recording analogue TV. The more recent Hauppauge cards use SoftPVR, which allows MPEG and MPEG-2 encoding in software provided that a sufficiently fast CPU is installed in the system.

=== MediaMVP ===
The MediaMVP is a thin client device that displays music, video and pictures (hence "MVP") on a television. It is based on an IBM PowerPC RISC processor specialized for multimedia decoding. The operating system is a form of Linux, and everything (including the menus) is served to the device via Ethernet or, on newer devices, 802.11g wireless LAN from the server PC.

Various open source software products can use the device as a front-end. An example is MVPMC, which allows the MediaMVP to be used as a front-end for MythTV or ReplayTV.

=== Table of products ===
Type	Model	Tuner	Host interface	Analog	Digital	Other	IR
Digital Terrestrial	DEC2000-t	Philips	USB 1.x TMX320AV7111	No	DVB-T (TDA10045)		Yes
Digital Terrestrial	DEC2540-t	Philips	USB 1.x TMX320AV7111	No	DVB-T (TDA10045)		Yes
Digital Terrestrial	Nova-t PCI	Grundig	PCI SAA7134	No	DVB-T (LSI L64781)		No
Digital Terrestrial	Nova-t PCI	Philips	PCI SAA7134	No	DVB-T (TDA10045)		Yes
Digital Terrestrial	Nova-t PCI (90002)	Thomson DTT7592	PCI CX2388x	No	DVB-T (CX22702)		Yes
Digital Terrestrial	Nova-t PCI (90003)	Thomson DTT75105	PCI CX2388x	No	DVB-T (CX22702)		Yes
Digital Terrestrial	Nova-t USB	Philips	USB 1.x	No	DVB-T (CX22702)		No
Digital Terrestrial	Nova-t USB2	Panasonic ENV57H	USB 2.0 Cypress FX2	No	DVB-T (DIB3000-P)		Yes
Digital Terrestrial	Nova-t Stick (70001)	Microtune MT2060	USB 2.0	No	DVB-T (DIB7000-M)		Optional
Digital Terrestrial	Nova-t Stick (70009)	Microtune MT2060	USB 2.0	No	DVB-T (DIB7700-P)		Optional
Digital Terrestrial	Nova-TD-Stick	2× MicroTune MT2266	USB 2.0	No	DVB-T (DIB7700-P)		Optional
Digital Terrestrial	Nova-t 500	2× Microtune MT2060	PCI VT6212L	No	2× DVB-T (DIB3000-P)		Yes
Digital Terrestrial	Nova-TD 500	2× Microtune ????	PCI DiB0710	No	2× DVB-T (DIB7070-P) ??		Yes
Digital Satellite	DEC3000-s	Unknown	USB 1.x TMX320AV7111	No	DVB-S		Yes
Digital Satellite	Nexus-s v2.3	Alps BSBE1-502A	PCI SAA7146 TMX320AV7111	No	DVB-S (STV0299)	S-video out	Yes
Digital Satellite	Nova-s PCI	Alps BSBE1-502A	PCI SAA7146	No	DVB-S (STV0299)		No
Digital Satellite	Nova-s SE PCI	Unknown	PCI SAA7146	No	DVB-S (TDA8260)		No
Digital Satellite	Nova-s USB	Unknown	USB 1.x	No	DVB-S		No
Digital Satellite	Nova-SE2	Unknown	PCI CX2388x	No	DVB-S (CX24123)		Yes
Digital Satellite	Nova-S-Plus	Unknown	PCI CX2388x	No	DVB-S (CX24123)	Composite in S-video in	Yes
Hybrid Video Recorder	HVR-900	Xceive XC3028	USB 2.0 EM2881	1× TVP5150A SoftPVR	DVB-T (ZL10353)	Composite in (opt) S-video in (opt)	Optional
Hybrid Video Recorder	HVR-900 (Rev B2 & C2)	Xceive XC3028	USB 2.0 EM2883	1× TVP5150A SoftPVR	DVB-T (DRX3975D)	Composite in (opt) S-video in (opt)	Optional
Hybrid Video Recorder	HVR-930	Xceive XC3028	USB 2.0 EM2881	1× TVP5150A SoftPVR	DVB-T (ZL10353)	Composite in (opt) S-video in (opt)	Optional
Hybrid Video Recorder	HVR-930 (Rev B2)	Xceive XC3028	USB 2.0 EM2883	1× TVP5150A SoftPVR	DVB-T (DRX3975D)	Composite in (opt) S-video in (opt)	Optional
Hybrid Video Recorder	HVR-950	Xceive XC3028	USB 2.0	1× TVP5150A SoftPVR	ATSC	Composite in (opt) S-video in (opt)	Optional
Hybrid Video Recorder	HVR-1100	Philips FMD1216ME	PCI CX2388x	1× CX2388x SoftPVR	DVB-T (CX22702)	Composite in S-video in FM radio	Yes
Hybrid Video Recorder	HVR-1110	Philips 8275A	PCI SAA7134	1× SAA7131 SoftPVR	DVB-T (TDA10046a)	Composite in S-video in FM radio	Yes
Hybrid Video Recorder	HVR-1300	Philips FMD1216ME	PCI CX2388x	1× CX2388x 1× CX23416	DVB-T (CX22702)	Composite in S-video in FM radio	Yes
Hybrid Video Recorder	HVR-1600	Analog TCL Series	PCI CX2388x	1× CX2388x 1× CX23418	ATSC (CX24227)	Composite in S-video in FM radio	Yes
Hybrid Video Recorder	HVR-1800	Analog TCL Series	PCI-e	Yes	ATSC / Clear QAM	Composite in S-video in FM radio	Yes
Hybrid Video Recorder	HVR-2200	2× Philips TDAxxxx	PCIe SAA7164	Yes	DVB-T (2× TDA10048HN)	Composite in S-video in FM radio	Yes
Hybrid Video Recorder	HVR-3000	Philips FMD1216ME	PCI CX2388x	1× CX2388x SoftPVR	DVB-T (CX22702) DVB-S (CX24123)	Composite in S-video in FM radio	Yes
Hybrid Video Recorder	HVR-4000	Philips FMD1216ME	PCI CX2388x	1× CX2388x SoftPVR	DVB-T (CX22702) DVB-S2 (CX24116)	Composite in S-video in FM radio	Yes
Personal Video Recorder	PVR PCI	Various	PCI Fusion 878A	1× Altera flex EPF6016 ATC144-3 1× Vision Tech Kfir	No		
Personal Video Recorder	PVR USB	Various	USB 1.x	1× SAA7113H 1× iTVC12	No		
Personal Video Recorder	PVR-150	Various	PCI CX2584x	1× CX2584x 1× CX23416	No	Composite in S-video in	Yes
Personal Video Recorder	PVR-160	Various	PCI CX2388x	1× CX2388x 1× CX23416	No	Composite in S-video in	No
Personal Video Recorder	PVR-250	Various	PCI SAA7115	1× SAA7115 1× ivac15	No	Composite in S-video in	Yes
Personal Video Recorder	PVR-250	Various	PCI SAA7115	1× SAA7115 1× CX23416	No	Composite in S-video in	Yes
Personal Video Recorder	PVR-350	Various	PCI SAA7115	1× SAA7115 1× ivac15	No	Composite in S-video in/out	Yes
Personal Video Recorder	PVR-500MCE	Various	PCI PLX FastLane 6140	2× CX2584x 2× CX23416	No	2× Composite in 2× S-video in FM radio	No
Personal Video Recorder	PVR-USB2	Various	USB 2.0 SAA7115	1× SAA7115 1× CX23416	No	Composite in S-video in FM radio	Yes
Personal Video Recorder	PVR-USB2+	Various	USB 2.0 Cypress FX2	1× CX2584x 1× CX23416	No	Composite in S-video in FM radio	Yes
High-Definition Personal Video Recorder	HD-PVR	Not Applicable	USB 2.0	No	No	Component In/out Composite in S-video in RCA Audio In; S/PDIF Optical Audio In/out	Yes
WinTV Analog	WinTV Express	Various	PCI BT878A	1× BT878A	No	Composite in	Yes
WinTV Analog	WinTV Go	Various	PCI Fusion 878A	1× Fusion 878A	No	Composite in	Yes
WinTV Analog	WinTV Go+	Various	PCI Fusion 878A	1× Fusion 878A	No	Composite in	Yes
WinTV Analog	WinTV Go2	Various	PCI CX2388x	1× CX2388x	No	Composite in	Yes
WinTV Analog	WinTV Primio FM	Various	PCI CX2388x	1× CX2388x	No	Composite in S-video in FM radio	Yes
WinTV Analog	WinTV PCI-FM	Various	PCI CX2388x	1× CX2388x	No	Composite in S-video in FM radio	Yes
WinTV Analog	WinTV Radio	Various	PCI BT878A	1× BT878A or 1× BT848 or 1× BT88x	No	Composite in S-video in FM radio	Yes
WinTV Analog	WinTV USB	Various	USB 1.x	1× SAA7113	No		No
WinTV Analog	WinTV USB Live	Various	USB 1.x	No	No	S-video in Composite in	No
WinTV Analog	WinTV USB2	Various	USB 2.0 EM2840	TVP5150	No		No

=== WinTV software ===
Hauppauge's principal software offering is WinTV, a TV tuning, viewing, and recording application supplied on a CD-ROM included with tuner hardware. A previous version was called WinTV2000 (WinTV32 without skins). It had companion applications, including WinTV Scheduler, which performs timed recordings, and WinTV Radio, which receives FM radio. It was modified towards a service-based software package, with card management and recordings taken care of by the "TV Server" service and EPG data collection by the "EPG Service", allowing WinTV2000 to work with multiple Hauppauge tuners in the same PC.

In 2007 Hauppauge launched WinTV Version 6, followed in 2009 by WinTV7. WinTV8 was current as of 2016. WinTV updates are available without charge to Hauppauge tuner users (major updates require access to a qualifying earlier WinTV installation CD, e.g. WinTV8 requires a CD not earlier than WinTV7). An option available at extra cost, WinTV Extend, allows TV to be streamed over the Internet to several portable devices such as smartphones, and PCs.

=== Wing ===
"Wing", a supplemental software application from Hauppauge, allows the company's PVR products to convert MPEG recordings into formats suitable for playback on the Apple iPod, Sony PSP or a DivX player; it converts MPEG-2 videos into H.264, MPEG-4 and DivX.

=== Third-party software ===
Third-party programs which support Hauppauge tuners include: GB-PVR, InterVideo WinDVR, Snapstream's Beyond TV, SageTV, Windows Media Center and the Linux-based MythTV.

=== Linux ===
Hauppauge offers limited support for Linux, with Ubuntu repositories and firmware downloads available on its website. There are drivers available from non-Hauppauge sources for most of the company's cards (in IVTV and LinuxTV). It appears that some of these drivers (Nova and HVR) are written by a Hauppauge engineer.

The PVR-150 captures video on Linux, but there are reportedly difficulties getting the remote control and IR blaster to work. Also, a January 2007 product substitution of HVR-1600 in PVR-150 retail boxes forced many Linux users to exchange their purchases because the Linux driver has not been updated for the HVR-1600.

SageTV Media Center for Linux supports PVR-150, PVR-250, PVR-350, PVR-500 and MediaMVP.

For ATSC and DVB applications, a list of Linux supported Hauppauge and other makes of TV cards can be found on the LinuxTVWiki page (see "Supported Hardware" section).
