= VBox Home TV Gateway =

VBox Home TV gateway is a network-enabled live TV tuner and PVR HDTV set-top-box produced by VBox Communications Ltd.

The VBox Home TV Gateway is also known as:

- V@Home TV Gateway PVR
- V@Home TV Gateway
- VHome TV Gateway
- VBox TV Gateway
- XTi

== History ==
VBox Communication was established in 2001 and received strategic investment from Optibase (now part of Vitec).

On Jan 9, 2002 VBox Communications acquired from BroadLogic (now part of Broadcom) its Satellite Express and DTV product lines, adding DVB core functionality to VBox's IP.

VBox TV Gateway technology was first used in its XLV Professional product line unveiled at the Satellite 2006 Show in Washington, D.C., targeting the hospitality, digital signage and enterprise markets.

The VBox Home TV Gateway is based on VBox's 6th generation XLV Professional product line. It debuted at the Mobile World Congress ShowStoppers event in Barcelona, Spain on February 23, 2014 and was first reviewed by CNET UK.

== Overview ==
VBox Home TV Gateway is a network TV tuner and digital video recorder providing both front and back ends, capable of recording and streaming multiple channels to multiple devices at the same time. Unlike standard set-top boxes it does not have an HDMI or other video or audio outputs that directly connect a television, instead its multiple DVB tuners receives the live TV RF signal from satellite, cable TV or terrestrial antenna and streams the decoded video over a local area network to any UPnP-enabled player such as a smart phone, tablet computer, smart TV, computer, or game console.

== Technical specifications ==
=== Supported DVB standards ===
RF input Signal	VBox Home TV Gateway Models							
DVB-S and DVB-S2	XTi-3332	XTi-3332CI	XTi-3334	XTi-3334CI	XTi-3340	XTi-3350	XTi-3340CI	XTi-3350CI
DVB-T	XTi-3342	XTi-3342CI	XTi-3340	XTi-3340CI	XTi-3442	XTi-4144	XTi-4174	
DVB-T2	XTi-3342	XTi-3342CI	XTi-3442	XTi-4144	XTi-4174			
DVB-C (annex A/C)	XTi-3352	XTi-3352CI	XTi-3350	XTi-3350CI	XTi-3452	XTi-4144	XTi-4174	
ISDB-T	XTi-4144	XTi-4174						
ATSC	XTi-4174							

=== Supported content ===
All VBox Home TV Gateway devices support free-to-air (FTA) content, models that end with CI also support encrypted pay TV content with single or dual Conditional-access module (CAM) Common Interface (CI) slots; there is no support for CI+ CAMs.

=== Supported recordings ===
Recording of live or scheduled TV program is available from any of the free VBox apps, the recordings are stored on an external storage and can be played from any device. Supported recording devices:

- USB attached storage such as USB flash drive or external HDD. Supported file systems: FAT32, FAT16, EXT 2, EXT 3, EXT 4
- Network storage - Windows Shared folder or NAS. Supported file system: SMB/CIFS

=== Simultaneous streaming of different channels ===
VBox guarantees a single channel per tuner, however, in reality, the tuner locks on a transponder or MUX and can stream all the available channels in that bouquet up to about 40 Mbit/s.

=== Compatibility and apps options ===
- UPnP - Any UPnP device or application (and DLNA although not officially supported) can discover the device and play live or recorded TV programs
- m3u - The device generates a link to an m3u channel playlist for connectivity with supported applications such as Kodi with the IPTV Simple PVR add-on, VLC, DVBLogic
- XMLTV - The device generates a link to an EPG XML TV program file for integration with 3rd party applications
- Web browser - A web browser with the VLC web plugin can connect directly to the device to watch and record live or scheduled TV and view the EPG
- Kodi - VBox PVR add-on, provided as part of Kodi Isengard and provides live TV, EPG, timeshift, remote access, external EPG source
- MythTV - VBox is supported from MythTV version 0.2.28
- Tvheadend
- VBRec for VBox XTi - iOS/Android 3rd party application, simplifying recording and search for EPG.
- VBox applications - iOS, Android, Android for the big screen (with remote control), Firefox add-on, VBox@TV PVR

== See also ==
- TiVo
- Monsoon HAVA
- Dreambox
- DBox2
- LocationFree Player
