= InterVideo WinDVR =

InterVideo WinDVR is a commercial digital video recorder (DVR) software package for Windows operating systems. It allows PCs to work as a TV set and a DVR at the same time, using a hardware-based TV turner card. It has an integrated electronic program guide (EPG) that is updated via the Internet. Its direct competition came from CyberLink PowerVCR.

In 2003 InterVideo posted a replacement product named WinDVD Recorder 4.5, offering discounts to the users by upgrading from WinDVR 3 or WinDVD Player 4. However, WinDVD Recorder is not compatible with Windows 98SE or ME (only 2000 and XP are supported). This is the reason WinDVR continued being sold, although without any further updates.

In 2006, InterVideo, the creator of WinDVD Recorder, was acquired by Corel Corporation. WinDVD Recorder has been discontinued, and no direct replacement has been announced. The last WinDVD Recorder version was 5.2.

== Features ==
The application can convert video from VHS tapes to DVD or video CD, and can capture screen shots from a program and save them as a bitmap image to a hard disk or other storage medium.

The EPG works with Decisionmark's TitanTV in the United States, Fast TV in Europe, and Sony IEPG in Japan.

It supports MPEG-1, MPEG-2, NTSC and PAL VCD, SVCD, and DVD formats.

The program displays video thumbnails of 16 channels at once so you can scan what's on at a glance.

The time-shifting feature allows pausing of live TV, and creation of instant replay, or fast-forward through commercials with InterVideo Home Theater.

The software also includes support for Teletext, a television information service in Europe.

WinDVD Recorder also includes the same functions of the product WinDVD Player on which it is based: battery life extender, hyper-threading technology, Movie Encyclopedia, aspect ratio correction, time-stretching, DivX support, playlist creation, preset display settings, and PAL TruSpeed.

== See also ==
- Microsoft Windows
- Windows Media Center
- Personal video recorder
- Direct to Disk Recording
- Comparison of PVR software packages
- D-VHS
- DVD recorder
- Freeview+
- Hard disk recorder
- Media PC
- MythTV
- SageTV
- TV tuner card
- CyberLink PowerVCR
