= Hauppauge MediaMVP =

Network media player

The Hauppauge MediaMVP is a network media player. It consists of a hardware unit with remote control, along with software for a Windows PC. Out of the box, it is capable of playing video and audio, displaying pictures, and "tuning in" to Internet radio stations. Alternative software is also available to extend its capabilities. It can be used as a front-end for various PVR projects.

== Capabilities ==
The MediaMVP can stream audio and video content from a host PC running Windows. It can display photos stored on the host PC. It can stream Internet radio via the host PC as well. It can display live TV with full PVR features with SageTV PVR software for Windows or Linux.

The capabilities listed below refer to the official software and firmware supplied by Hauppauge.

=== Video ===
The MediaMVP supports only the MPEG (MPEG-1 and MPEG-2) video format. However, depending on the MediaMVP host software running on the host computer, the host software may be able to transcode other video file formats before sending them to the MediaMVP in the MPEG format. The maximum un-transcoded playable video size is SDTV (480i). HDTV MPEG streams (e.g. 720p) need to be transcoded in real-time on the computer to SD format. Transcoding video can tax some slower computers.

With a hardware MPEG decoder as part of its PowerPC processor, it renders moving video images more smoothly than many software PVR implementations.

=== Audio ===
Supported audio file formats include MP3 and WMA. Playlist formats supported include M3U, PLS, ASX and B4S.

See also Internet radio below.

=== Photos ===
Supported image file formats include JPG and GIF.

Slideshows are supported. Listening to music (including streaming Internet radio) during slideshows is supported as well.

=== Internet radio ===
Supports streaming Internet radio stations via the host PC.

=== Other capabilities ===
Can schedule recording of television broadcasts when using a Hauppauge WinTV TV tuner card with the Hauppauge WinTV recording software.

== Hardware ==
The MediaMVP hardware consists of a small set-top box and an infrared remote control. It can be oriented either horizontally or vertically (using a supplied base). It's normally operated via the supplied remote control. Behind the unit's red translucent front panel is a single red LED. The LED is used as a power indicator, and also flashes when the unit's remote control is used. Typical (wired) units consume less than 5W. The power supply for the original MediaMVP consists of 6VDC, 1.66A coaxial DC power connector. The outer sleeve is the negative terminal and the inner tip is the positive terminal.

=== Connectivity ===
The rear of the MediaMVP unit has a plug for 6 VDC power, an Ethernet port, and in the US edition, S-Video out, composite video out, and stereo audio out, while the European edition has instead a single "SCART out" connector, offering additional RGB output possibilities, and bundles a SCART lead with 2 extra stereo audio cables with female RCA connectors coming out of one of the plugs.

Model 1016, the "wMVP", has Wireless G connectivity. however, this connection method can be inadequate for viewing digital television recordings depending on signal strength and reliability.

A modified version of the unit is rebranded as Helius Media Stream and is fitted with a standard channel 3/4 RF modulator. This box is a better choice for TVs that lack separate RCA audio/video inputs.

=== Processor, RAM and firmware ===
The MediaMVP uses the IBM STB02500, a PowerPC 405 CPU integrated with functionality especially suited for use in set-top boxes, like MPEG2 decoder.

The unit has 16MB of SDRAM.

It runs on Linux-based firmware. Hauppauge has delivered enhancements and new functionality to the MediaMVP from time to time by releasing updated firmware. Firmware updates are delivered to the device when it is powered up.

== Notes ==
=== Internet radio ===
See list of Internet radio stations.

Can play MMS streams, e.g. mms://some.radio.station/path/to/stream/

Can play HTTP streams, e.g. http://some.radio.station/path/to/stream/

== See also ==
- Home theater PC
- Media center (disambiguation)
- Dreambox
- Moxi
- Telly (home entertainment server)
