= 57th Technology and Engineering Emmy Awards =

2005 awards ceremony

- Date: 29 September 2005
- Location: Bristol-Myers Squibb; Princeton, New Jersey
- Hosted by: Mark Cuban
- Website: http://www.emmyonline.org/tech/

The 57th Technology and Engineering Emmy Awards was held on 29 September 2005. The National Television Academy announced the winners at Bristol-Myers Squibb in Princeton, New Jersey.

== Awardees ==
- For slow-motion color recording and playback for broadcast:
  - Ampex
  - ABC
- For closed caption standardization:
  - ABC, American Broadcasting Company
  - PBS, Public Broadcasting Service
  - CEA, Consumer Electronics Association
- For pioneering development of locally integrated and branded content using IP Store and forward technology:
  - The WB
  - IBM
- For lens technology developments for solid state imagers cameras in high definition formats:
  - Canon USA Inc.
  - Fujinon
  - Thales Angeniux
- For the first intercontinental satellite TV transmission:
  - AT&T

=== Video Gaming Technology and Applications ===
Emmys were also bestowed for Video Gaming Technology and Applications, for the second year running. The award recognizes pioneering efforts and breakthroughs in the gaming world.

- Development and Impact in 8-bit consoles:
  - Atari, Inc. for Atari 2600
- Development and Impact in Polygon consoles:
  - Sony for PlayStation
- Development of Multiplayer console technology:
  - Microsoft for Xbox Live

=== Advanced Media Technology ===
The Advanced Media Technology awards honor the work being done in Interactive Television, New Media and related programming and technology. The technologies that are considered in this group embrace the expanded definition of television and include non-linear creation and distribution, point to point delivery, one and two screen television technologies and gaming for television delivery.

- The winner for Outstanding Achievement in Advanced Media Technology for the Enhancement of Original Television Content is:
  - TOURCast by PGATour.com
- The winner for Outstanding Achievement in Advanced Media Technology for the Non-Synchronous Enhancement of Original Television Content is:
  - ImageGuide/www.living.com by EAT.tv, LLC/Scripps Networks
- The winner for Outstanding Achievement in Advanced Media Technology for the Creation of Non-Traditional Programs or Platforms is:
  - Moxi Media Center: New Features for 2005 by Digeo

=== Lifetime Achievement Award ===
For the first time, the Academy bestowed a Lifetime Achievement Award in the area of Technology and Engineering. Mark Cuban, owner of the Dallas Mavericks and founder of HDnet, presented the award to the original inventors of the videotape recorder: Charlie Ginsburg, Ray Dolby, Alex Maxey, Charlie Anderson, Fred Pfost and Shelby Henderson. The six men, all then working for Ampex, introduced the VR-1000, (later named the Ampex Mark IV) the first practical videotape recorder, to the world on 14 March 1956 at the National Association of Radio and Television Broadcasters convention in Chicago.
