= SnapStream =

American software company

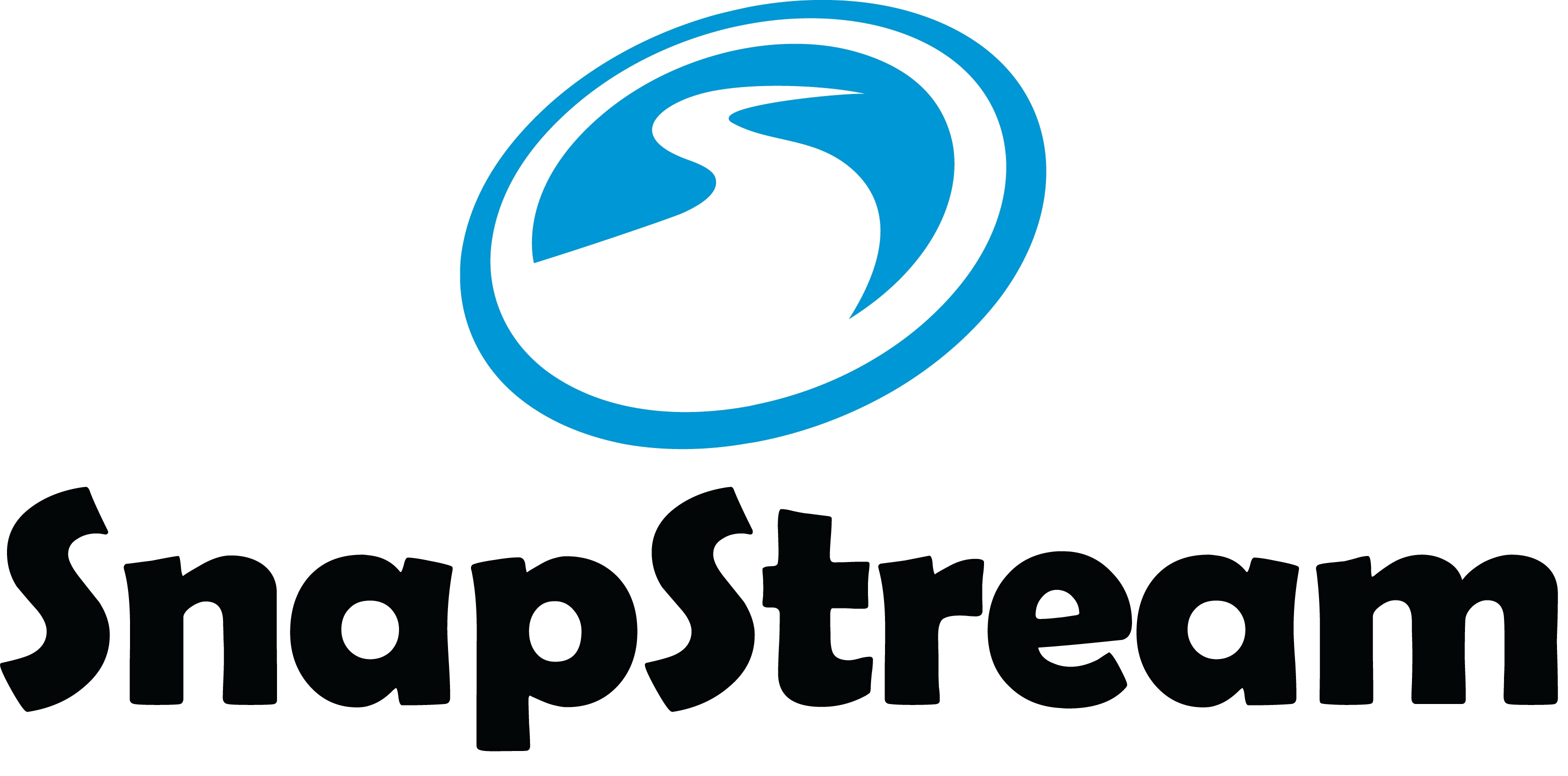
- Founded: 2000
- Headquarters: Houston, Texas
- Products: Enterprise: TV Search (2007); Consumer: Beyond TV (2000); OS: Microsoft Windows XP, Windows 2000, Windows Vista, Windows 7 or Mac OS X Snow Leopard and above.
- Website: snapstream.com

SnapStream is a privately held software company based in Houston, Texas, United States that focuses on building TV monitoring software for organizations in broadcast, government and education. Prior to developing TV Search, SnapStream was long recognized in the consumer world of HTPC for the creation of Beyond TV. However, Beyond TV has not been updated since 2010, as a result of the company shifting focus towards the Enterprise Search product.

== Products ==
=== SnapStream TV Search ===
In mid-2007, SnapStream developed the SnapStream enterprise app for the purposes of searching, recording and monitoring television. SnapStream, the TV search engine, enables users to interface with television as a clippable, editable and linkable medium from their Mac or PC. SnapStream was a broadcast industry pioneer in creating such a crossover device, converging search engine capabilities and digital video recording. Today, the TV search appliance is deployed at all kinds of organizations in government, education and entertainment who closely monitor and archive traditional television media.

=== Firefly PC Remote ===
Released in 2004, this remote control uses radio frequency to operate a Windows-based computer via its Beyond Media Basic software (or a Windows XP Media Center Edition PC via Microsoft's Media Center Edition operating system) and can control other applications.

=== TV Trends ===
TV Trends, a free and open resource to the public, was SnapStream's online database of searchable TV. TV Trends extrapolates hot words (in ranking popularity) and cold words (by reduced frequency) from a spectrum of national news programs such as ABC, CBS, NBC, Fox, Fox News, MSNBC, CNN, and HLN.

Accordingly, these patterns may align with trending topics on Twitter and Google, and provide a measurable indicator of the associative relationship between traditional media and social media at any given time.

Type in up to 10 keywords for comparison and the site creates visual graphs, showing a historical representation of televised media coverage dating back to late 2008. TV Trends graphs can be embedded so that users can interact with and manipulate the timeline view.

The service was taken down on June 21, 2011, according to the company's blog.
