= DVB Dream =

Television and radio software

- Original author: Tepesoft
- Initial release: 2003
- Stable release: 3.6 / October 29, 2018; 7 years ago
- Operating system: Windows 2000, Windows XP, Windows Vista, Windows 7, Windows 8, Windows 10
- Size: 16.8 MB
- Available in: 29 languages
- Type: HTPC, television, Digital Video Broadcasting
- License: Proprietary
- Website: www.dvbdream.org

DVB Dream is a proprietary software for watching and recording of digital TV and radio with help of a digital TV tuner card (Internal PCI / PCI-Express cards or external USB devices). It supports the standards DVB-S (satellite), DVB-C (cable), DVB-T (terrestrial), ISDB-T, ISDB-S and ATSC.

It has STB-like features including PIP (Picture-in-picture), record, Timeshift, EPG, Scheduler, Unicable support, Positioner support (including GotoX.X / USALS), UHD (4K), HD, HEVC, H264, child lock, and remote control support.

There are also features that cannot be seen on STBs but provided with help of flexible Windows GUI environment. These are: Multi PIP(watching more than 1 channel at the same time), Multi record (recording more than 1 channel at the same time), LAN Streaming, VLC or MPC Integration, Auto-zap, Unique channel list system by grouping/ordering/filtering by several flexible options, Render-less mode, Multi monitor support, Command line support, Plugins support.

Being a Windows application, user interface can be customized with help of themes and foldable GUI elements. It can be localized in most of the languages (29 languages are supported, as in 2015).

== Editions ==
DVB Dream has two editions, shareware and OEM versions. OEM version is currently bundled by the tuner card manufacturer TBS with their products.

== Reviews ==
Chip Magazine Germany noted that DVB Dream is favorably preferred than most of the bundled software packages that come with TV cards. European edition of the same magazine also praised DVB Dream being one of the options available for Windows, offering support for DVB-S, DVB-S2, DVB-C and DVB-T tuner cards, and being very easy to set up and use. "

According to Tele Satellite Magazine, DVB Dream comes with a multitude of settings capabilities and features; a tool not only for the beginner but also for the professional
