= PhotoImpression =

Discontinued image management software

- The Get Photo tab in PhotoImpression 5 for Mac OS X
- Developer: ArcSoft
- Final release: 6.5 Gold
- Operating system: Mac OS 9, Mac OS X, Windows
- Included with: Bundled with certain cameras and scanners
- Type: Image manager
- License: Proprietary
- Website: www.arcsoft.com/products/photoimpression/

PhotoImpression is a discontinued proprietary image management and editing software created by ArcSoft for Mac OS X and Windows. It was often bundled with Epson all-in-one printers, scanners, and cameras but could be purchased separately. PhotoImpression was marketed as an entry-level image editor and was sold for around $40-$50.

== Features ==
PhotoImpression has basic photo editing tools such as brightness/contrast adjustment and adding text to images. It has support for layers, special effects, and provides templates such as frames and greeting cards. Some versions could be linked to PhotoIsland.com, a photo sharing website made by ArcSoft. PhotoImpression 6.5 Gold, the last version, can automatically get images from the user's computer and has support for adjusting color, contrast, lighting, blur, and red-eye. It also includes a paintbrush, clipart, frame templates, and the ability to add text captions. It can be used to create albums, picture books, and slideshows.

== Versions ==
- PhotoImpression 1
- PhotoImpression 2000
- PhotoImpression 3
- PhotoImpression 4
- PhotoImpression 5
- PhotoImpression 6
- PhotoImpression 6.5 Gold

== Reception ==
PCWorld praised PhotoImpression 6.5 Gold's ease of use and editing features, but noted its lack of sharing features. Softpedia also noted the ease-of-use and editing features of PhotoImpression 6.5. MacWorld gave PhotoImpression 3 3.5 stars, noting the ease-of-use. PCMag gave a more negative review of PhotoImpression 2000, stating that "it doesn't have all the one-click fixes that novices desire."
