= DVBViewer =

Media software

- Screenshot of DVBViewer 4.9.6.20 running on Windows 7.
- Original author: Christian Hackbart
- Developers: Christian Hackbart, Lars Gehre
- Initial release: 2002
- Stable release: 7.3.1.0 / 29 December 2024; 15 months ago
- Preview release: 7.0.2.2 beta / 20 February 2021; 5 years ago
- Written in: Delphi
- Operating system: Windows 98, Windows ME, Windows 2000, Windows XP, Windows Vista, Windows 7, Windows 10
- Size: 9720 KiB
- Available in: 21 languages
- Type: HTPC, television, Digital Video Broadcasting
- License: Proprietary
- Website: www.dvbviewer.com

DVBViewer is proprietary, commercial software for viewing & recording of DVB TV & Radio using a TV tuner card or box and a Media Center for viewing Music, Video and Pictures. Among its other features are an Electronic Program Guide (EPG), remote control support, on-screen display, teletext, time shifting and picture-in-picture. Besides the support for BDA adapters, there is also the ability to use the Hauppauge MediaMVP with DVBViewer. The software also allows Unicable, DiSEqC and usage of CI-Modules with most adapters. The worldwide charge for the application is 15 euro or 22 US Dollars. Additional functions such as video on demand, TV series and movie management, home network distribution of TV to network devices including iPod Touch, iPhone & iPad & Android devices (with additional remote control features), and a recording service with web interface are provided by free plugins. A plug-in offering MHEG-5 and HbbTV support is available for a license fee of 12 euros.

DVBViewer was the first windows application with HDTV support, right after the Euro 1080 started its transmission via satellite. It also was one of the first alternative applications supporting the DVB-S2 broadcast standard and being compatible to most tuner cards supporting this standard using BDA, a standardized driver interface for digital video capture developed by Microsoft. Therefore, it presented itself as a valuable replacement for the manufacturers bundled software, often only providing fundamental functionality. The current version allows the use of Sat-IP on the client- and also on the server side.

== Editions ==
There are three editions of the DVBViewer available, an OEM edition, a commercial one, DVBViewer Pro and an alternative edition, DVBViewer GE, mainly aimed at German speaking customers of the commercial edition. An OEM edition is included with products by various manufacturers:

- TechniSat DVBViewer TE & TE2
- TerraTec DVBViewer Terratec Edition
- TechnoTrend TT Viewer
- Digital Everywhere
- DVBSky
- Turbosight
- DVBShop
- RF Central.

== Reviews ==
A comprehensive review (in German) of the software can be found at DVBMagic, or in English in the UK's best selling computer magazine, Computeractive. DVBViewer is also mentioned in 16 hardware reviews on techradar, Future plc's UK Tech magazine.
