= Telly (home entertainment server) =

Interact-TV Inc.
- The Interact-TV "Telly" penguin and logo
- Type: Public company
- Traded as: OTCID Basic Current: ITVI
- Industry: TV/Video equipment, Entertainment
- Founded: 2000
- Headquarters: Wilmington, Delaware, United States
- Key people: Robert Bryan, president
- Products: TellyMinder; Spin off, JDV Solutions Inc. home entertainment servers, Linux Media Center software; Subsidiary, Viscount Media Trust, media company; Subsidiary, Pocket Kid Records, record label
- Website: www.interact-tv-inc.com

The Telly home entertainment server is range of computer systems designed to store, manage, and access all forms of digital media in the home. Based on Interact-TV's Linux Media Center software, it provides user managed libraries for music, photos, and all forms of video from recorded television programming to DVDs.

Expandable hard drive configurations accommodate growing libraries of home entertainment content and provide an alternative to Desktop and Laptop PCs for entertainment content. Networked configurations distribute content shared from all units throughout a network and allow recording at each location. Content on Telly systems appears to both Windows and Mac PCs as local networked volumes and can be accessed over the network. The Telly server web site provides management of and access to music, photos, and video.

Telly home entertainment servers use a trackball driven user interface and are offered with full high-definition television (HDTV) outputs, built-in digital video recorder (DVR) capabilities and a variety of other accessories. As a home entertainment server, Telly systems differ from traditional media center systems in that it is designed from inception to be configured and operated from a TV-based menu, and as a true server, permits integrated file sharing and secure volume managed expandable storage.

== Key features ==
A Telly Home Entertainment Server

Telly Servers are available in a range of models from small set-top sized to rack-mount systems. Each system contains a Linux OS and motherboard and one or more hard drives. All models may additionally have tuners and CD/DVD burners for both import and archiving owners content.

=== Video functionality ===
- Users can watch or save DVDs in a Telly server video library for full resolution, progressive scan DVD playback
- Facilities are provided for watching live, delayed or recorded TV, home videos and Internet downloaded video, all of which are stored in the Telly Video Library
- Video Library contents can be viewed and sorted by Cover Art Navigation or In-Depth Program Information
- Music DVDs (such as recorded concerts) in the Video Library can also be copied as music tracks into the Music Library - this permits mixing tracks from music DVD with tracks from the Music Library.
- HD Telly systems upsample the native resolution of recorded TV and regular DVDs from 480i to 720p.
- When users stop any playback of any video, a Resume button is provided to allow any networked Telly server to pick up where it left off
- Telly home entertainment servers support all common non-DRM video formats including AVI, DivX, MPEG-1, MPEG-2 and MPEG-4
- Networking allows users to move media between other Telly systems, PCs or portable media players
- Video files can be imported to Telly from other PCs on the network
- Internet video sources such as YouTube can be played on Telly servers

=== Music functionality ===
- Jukebox capabilities play single songs or queue any music collection, genre, artist, or album
- Sort the Jukebox looking at traditional lists or album cover art and build collections for playback.
- Created playlists of selected music can be played at any time or burn them on a CD
- Users can view music animations during playback and interleave music DVD tracks from the Video Library
- Users can set the music quality when storing CDs with the built-in CD player including the option of Lossless Audio Encoding (a format that maintains the original CD quality and still creates files that are compressed to save disc space)
- Support is provided for drag and drop music collections from PCs and Macs to Telly server Import Music folder in most popular non-DRM formats including MP3, AAC, and FLAC
- Telly systems provide a built-in Web Server allowing any computer to access the Music Library to manage tracks or edit album details
- Telly servers can stream music to any browser
- Telly systems support internet radio playout

=== Photo functionality ===
- Telly servers scale all photos to fit the connected TV screen and will support full 1080 HDTV resolution for presentation of high quality display of Photo Library contents
- Telly Photo Library contents can be browsed on the TV screen as thumbnails or as automatic or manually advanced slide shows with predetermined playback or random order playback
- The built-in web site access provides the ability to create, add to, and edit Photo Library contents

=== Networking functionality ===
- Telly Servers can be networked to grow as users' digital media libraries grow - most systems provide 1000/100/10 Base Ethernet connectivity and can be outfitted with wireless or power-line networking capability.
- Each Telly Server can act as a standalone system to manage and access digital media
  - Each system provides a set of video and audio outputs to connect directly to a TV (either standard definition or high definition) and audio system
  - The analog stereo and digital audio outputs can be connected to a TV's audio input or to an audio receiver with surround sound
- Built-in network sharing provides for access to or copying digital media between your Windows or Mac and Telly servers using any common web browser and network folder sharing including tools like the My Network Places and Macs using Bonjour
- All that entertainment content can be made available to other rooms of the house by adding a TellyVizion Playback Unit to your home network over any Ethernet connection between the Telly Server and the TellyVizion.
- Systems can be configured with a central Telly Server with a TellyVizion as discussed above or by adding a second Telly Server providing the following advantages:
  - Two servers double (or more depending on the Telly Server configuration) the amount of storage for digital media.
  - Content on each Telly Server can be personalized to exclude shows you don’t want to share with your kids (like The Sopranos) and to exclude shows you don’t care to watch (like The Wiggles), you can keep the content of each server separate by turning off the sharing capability, and content on individual servers can be isolated to prevent accidental deletion
  - As time passes and tastes change, users can always turn sharing back on for access the content from any Telly Server on the home network
- With a large digital media libraries, users can further extend storage by adding a TellyRAID system, providing any amount of storage, plus the added protection of RAID in case a hard disk drive fails - TellyRAID connects to one master Telly Server, which then provides the digital media stored on the TellyRAID to other TellyVizions or other Telly Servers throughout the house

== History ==
Interact-TV corporate logo

Corporate Info
Interact-TV, Inc. is a Delaware C Corporation, founded in 2000 by a group of television professionals and was originally headquartered in Westminster, Colorado. Interact-TV, Inc. is currently a public company quoted on the OTC Markets under the symbol ITVI, and headquartered in Delaware.

Interact-TV was formed to develop software products that centralize both the Entertainment and Information experience. Interact-TV products blend Digital Media, Broadband, and Home Networking, then bring it to the end-user through a Television Interface. Interact-TV products focus on the increasing availability of broadband access to the home, and a pervasive demand for higher-value entertainment.

Its initial product, The Telly MC1000 Digital Entertainment Center, began shipping in 2002. This was the first integrated system to allow users to access most forms of digital entertainment including broadband Internet, cable and satellite television, digital audio and video entertainment, and digital home networking.

The Telly home entertainment server product line was continually enhanced and includes a complete line of servers, available through a network of dealers. The Interact-TV Telly product line established a business‑to‑business customer base including a partnership in November 2005 with Turner Broadcasting Systems (TBS) for over 500 Telly product units and special software work for Video‑On‑Demand (VOD) trials and services.

In 2009 Interact-TV, Inc. acquired Viscount Records, Inc. and Viscount Media Trust from the Medley family, in a deal structured by investment banker, Stan Medley. Shortly thereafter, Interact-TV, Inc. transferred all of its Telly properties operations (except for the Telly Minder system which was and is still under development) to JDV Solutions Inc., a spinoff of Interact-TV Inc. Since late 2009, Telly Systems (except for the Telly Minder) have been sold and serviced by JDV Solutions.

Since 2010 Interact-TV, Inc. has shifted its focus more to the production side of entertainment with the formation of Pocket Kid Records, and a Web Channel in 2010. Pocket Kid Records has been operating successfully with the band Dead Sara under contract and has had less success with the development of its Web-Channel and Telly Minder properties.

== Operational requirements ==
Telly home entertainment servers require an Internet connection for many features. Telly systems network over Ethernet to other computers and work with most cable set top boxes and both Dish and Direct-TV satellite via a simple infrared interface.

== See also ==
- Home theater PC
- Media center (disambiguation)
- Dreambox
- Moxi
