= TOURCast =

Sports software

- Developers: PGA TOUR, iX.co, Virtual Eye - a division of Animation Research Ltd (ARL)
- Release: March 2020
- Stable release: Release 2 / June 2020
- Written in: Babylon.js & Java Middlware
- Platform: Cross-platform
- Available in: English
- Type: Sports Software
- Website: www.pgatour.com/tourcast.html

TOURCast is an interactive internet application that allows users to track the action of golf players playing on the PGA Tour in real-time. It was built by iX.co and Virtual Eye, a division of Animation Research Ltd (ARL), in accordance with the PGA TOUR Digital Product Team.

TOURCast lets viewers follow players’ progress around a golf course, by exploring the graphically traced results of each shot by leveraging ShotLink data. ShotLink, the PGA Tour's data gathering information system is used to provide the necessary real-time information to TOURCast. However, TOURCast takes shot trails a step further by depicting the course through interactive 3D renderings produced via overlaying high-resolution imagery captured by low flying aircraft on to computer-aided design (CAD) wireframes.

Before a golfer hits a shot, viewers can see his career history on the hole he’s playing, his up-to-the-minute strokes-gained data for the tournament and the season, his position on the leader board, how tough the hole is playing on the day, yardages to the pin, front and back of the green, and manipulate the view angles to capture the views from wherever the players may be standing.

Once the shot is hit, fans will have significantly more data than previously at their disposal. Swing speed, ball speed, spin rate, apex height, and more will be provided by Trackman's radar technology. This data is also used to provide the true “ball-in-motion” flight path of every tee shot. If a player hits a rope hook or a stinger, you’ll see just how much the ball moved from right to left or how low the apex was.

TOURCast also provides the ability to replay the video for every shot captured on camera. The camera feeds are passed through an AI-driven video highlight cutting and posting program, facilitated by WSC sports, which will result in every shot captured by a PGA TOUR camera being immediately posted to TourCast. If a player is in a featured group, that means virtually every one of his shots will be viewable through TOURCast in near real-time.

In 2025, the PGA Tour announced they would be incorporating generative AI commentary on the platform.

== Early versions ==
The original version of TOURCast was built by IBM and Sport Vision. It was a subscription-based, accessible through the PGA Tour's website, with a limited free version available to users as well. ShotLink, the PGA Tour's data gathering information system is used to provide the necessary real-time information to TOURCast.

TOURCast was introduced in 2003, at the Nissan Open hosted by Pacific Palisades's Riviera Country Club. In 2005, TOURCast received an Emmy Award for "Outstanding Achievement" in the category Advanced Media Technology for the Enhancement of Original Television Content.
