= Beyond TV =

- Developer: SnapStream Media
- Initial release: 2000
- Stable release: 4.9.3 / October 15, 2010; 15 years ago
- Operating system: Microsoft Windows
- Type: Media center
- License: Proprietary commercial software
- Website: Beyond TV

Beyond TV is a discontinued digital video recorder/media center application for Microsoft Windows produced by the American company SnapStream. The software was originally released in 2000 as a Personal Video Station. Like most media center software, and devices such as TiVo and Sky+, Beyond TV has a 10-foot user interface design for the living-room TV. Allowing you to watch, pause and record live TV, as well as schedule recording. It also allows you to search for a show in its electronic program guide, enabling the user to find out when shows are on without having to search through the listings themselves.

Some of the more powerful and unique functions that Beyond TV offers are SmartSkip, the ability to automatically detect scene changes, including commercials, and then quickly jump between them. ShowSqueeze, the option to compress your TV recordings to other formats and profiles. Beyond TV can also be used in a server - client configuration, that allows one computer to host your media and TV tuning capabilities, allowing other computers which are connected to the device via a network to stream this information. These additional computers could also be connected to TVs for more comfortable viewing.

Beyond TV 4.5 offers an optional DVD burning plug-in, which allows you to burn directly from the application to DVD. DVD burning is only supported for mpeg2 recorded shows.

Beyond TV 4.9.0 now enables placeshifting through its web admin interface. Placeshifting is a technology that allows users with broadband internet connection to stream video from their TV set or personal video recorder forwarded, enabling them to watch anywhere on a computer display device.

Beyond TV 4 was featured in PCWorld.ca's guide to turning your PC into a PVR

In 2010, Snapstream officially acknowledged that Beyond TV was discontinued. While support remained for some time, it was no longer available for purchase, nor would it see any further development due to Snapstream's corporate shift of direction. The last update was in 2010.

== See also ==
- Comparison of DVR software packages
