= SageTV =

Open-source media center application

- SageTV v9.2.16 home screen
- Release: 2002
- Stable release: v9.2.17 / August 4, 2026
- Written in: Java, C++, C, Shell script
- Operating system: Windows, Linux
- Type: Media center application and digital video recorder
- License: Apache License 2.0
- Website: www.sagetv.com (deprecated); Windows releases Linux releases SageTV forums
- Repository: https://github.com/google/sagetv

SageTV is a free and formerly proprietary, open-source media center application and digital video recorder software for Windows, Linux, and formerly macOS. The SageTV software has an integrated Electronic Programming Guide (EPG) that is updated via the Internet. The program provides a television interface for DVR, music, and photos on Windows and Linux. SageTV Media Center typically records in standard MPEG2, making it possible to transfer recordings to laptops or other devices. It also has a built-in conversion feature to transcode files into other formats compatible with iPod, PSP, cell phones and other portable devices.

A "lite" version was commonly shipped as part of an OEM software bundle. Both the lite and regular versions offer a Java API.

SageTV Placeshifter allows the user to watch TV from any high speed internet connection, similar to the Slingbox. As of Version 6, the SageTV Placeshifter is available for Windows, Linux and Macintosh platforms. The SageTV Media Extender set-top allows other TVs to connect to SageTV over a home network. There is also the ability to use the Hauppauge MediaMVP with SageTV by purchasing a MediaMVP Client License.

On June 18, 2011, Jeffrey Kardatzke, CTO and founder of the company, announced in a SageTV forum post that his company had been acquired by Google. An official press release followed later the same day, and since then the SageTV products have no longer been available for purchase.

On March 9, 2015, Jeffrey Kardatzke announced that SageTV would be open-sourced "in the near future (i.e. months, not years)". Then a few months later, SageTV became open source, hosted on GitHub.

== Google Fiber ==
After the acquisition of SageTV, LLC by Google, they began modifying and updating it to work with Google's upcoming Google Fiber TV service. SageTV v8 was the initial platform used for the Google Fiber Storage Box (DVR) and TV Box (Client). It has since been replaced with an in-house developed software.

== SageTV Media Center for Linux ==
SageTV Media Center for Linux is compatible with most major Linux distributions. Information on a Gentoo distribution tuned for Media Center usage is available from the SageTV website. It runs on low cost PC and consumer electronics hardware including embedded processors (embedded only available for OEMs).

== SageTV Studio ==
SageTV software also includes a SageTV Studio Development GUI that allows the customization of the user interface and development of add-ons. The company provides documentation so that these customizations can use a Java API. Built-in EPG support is available only for North America; however, the developer community has developed plug-ins that allow unsupported regions to access EPG info through sources such as XMLTV and ICETV in Australia. Additionally, there are IMDb and commercial skipping plugins.

== Other PVR software ==
- Comparison of PVR software packages
