= ArcSoft =

American software development company

- Type: Private
- Industry: Multimedia Software
- Founded: 1994; 32 years ago
- Founder: Michael Deng
- Headquarters: Fremont, California, United States
- Area served: Europe; Asia
- Number of employees: 800
- Website: www.arcsoft.com

ArcSoft, Inc. is a photo and video imaging software development company that offers digital imaging technologies.

Established in 1994, ArcSoft is headquartered in Fremont, California, with regional commercial and development facilities in Europe and Asia, specifically Taipei, Seoul, Tokyo, Shanghai, Hangzhou, and Nanjing. Michael Deng, ArcSoft's CEO, founded the company with $150,000 in funding from family and friends.

== Products ==
Arcsoft's current or former products include

- Link+ 3
- Album
- TotalMedia Theatre 5, which have been reviewed by PCMag.
- MediaConverter 7.5
- ShowBiz 5
- Panorama Maker 6
- MediaImpression 3 HD
- Video Downloader 3
- DVD SlideShow
- WebCam Companion 4
- Portrait+
- Perfect365
- ShowBiz 5
- PhotoStudio 6
- PhotoImpression 6.5 Gold
- PhotoStudio Paint
- PhotoStudio Darkroom 2
- Print Creations
