= Moxi (DVR) =

Moxi HD DVR
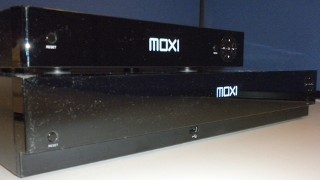
- Moxi HD DVR (bottom) with Moxi Mate (top)
- Manufacturer: ARRIS Group, Inc.
- Type: Digital Video Recorder
- Released: December 2008
- Operating system: Proprietary Linux
- Storage: 500GB
- Input: RF coax
- Connectivity: HDMI, Component, Composite, S-Video, Ethernet
- Online services: Moxi.com
- Dimensions: 17"W x 3"H x 10.5"D
- Weight: 15 lbs

Moxi was a line of high-definition digital video recorders produced by Moxi Digital Digeo and Arris International. Moxi was originally released only to cable operators, but in December 2008 it was released as a retail product. Moxi was removed from the market in November 2011. The former retail product, the Moxi HD DVR, provided a high-definition user interface with support for either two or three CableCARD TV tuners. Arris also offered a companion appliance, the Moxi Mate, which could stream live or recorded TV from a Moxi HD DVR.

== History ==
Digeo was founded in 1999 (originally under the name Broadband Partners, Inc.) by Microsoft co-founder Paul Allen, with headquarters in Kirkland, Washington. In the same year, Rearden Steel was started by Steve Perlman, founder of WebTV, under a veil of secrecy. In 2000, Rearden Steel was renamed to Moxi Digital while unveiling a line of media centers designed to bridge the gap between personal computers and televisions. Digeo, Inc. purchased Moxi Digital in 2002. Digeo kept its own name but adopted Moxi as its product family name. Its Palo Alto offices and most of Moxi Digital's staff were kept. Digeo also adopted most of the Moxi hardware (originally focused on satellite consumer electronics), as well as some of the Linux extensions, which were merged into Digeo's own Linux-based infrastructure and cable-specific hardware with Digeo's user interface, known as Moxi Menu.

In 2005, for the Advanced Media Technology Emmy, The Moxi Media Center was recognized for Outstanding Achievement in Advanced Media Technology for the Creation of Non-Traditional Programs or Platforms.

On September 22, 2009, the assets of Digeo, Inc. were purchased by the Arris International. Arris announced it would continue to develop and market the Moxi product line to both retail customers and cable operators.

Arris stopped selling Moxi products in 2012 and ended technical support in 2013.

== Retail DVR products ==
The Moxi HD DVR was a high-definition digital video recorder (DVR) with both three-tuner and two-tuner models available, though the two-tuner model was produced only briefly before being updated. It was designed for use with cable television and supported multi-stream CableCARDs, as well as channel scanning for unencrypted channels. Multi-room viewing was supported using a small (and less expensive) companion device called a Moxi Mate. The Moxi product line was released to retail in December 2008 after many years of being available only to cable operators. From 2009, Arris offered multi-room packages. Retail sales were suspended early in 2012.

=== DVR hardware ===
The Moxi HD DVR was a Broadcom BCM7400-based set-top box designed to work with a Multi-stream CableCARD. Moxi features were added to the Arris Moxi Gateway and Moxi Player, for sale to cable companies only.

The hardware features two or three HD tuners, allowing users to record two or three shows at the same time, depending on the model; 500 GB storage, which equates to 75 hours of 1080 HD recording or 300 hours of SD (480i) recording; and Dolby Digital surround sound.

The Moxi HD DVR was compatible with eSATA external hard drives certified for DVR use. External drives allowed users to extend their hard drive space. Drives up to 6.5TB were supported.

Moxi HD DVRs supported 480i, 480p, 720p, 1080i, and 1080p 24 and 30 Hz TV resolutions.

=== Moxi Mate hardware ===
The Moxi Mate was the multi-room extender for the Moxi HD DVR released in August 2009. It was a set-top box that connects with the Moxi HD DVR over a home network to let users watch TV in other rooms. The Moxi Mate can could play media files available from the home network or the Internet using the same interface as the HD DVR.

== See also ==
- Hauppauge MediaMVP
- Dreambox
- DBox2
- Monsoon HAVA
- HDHomeRun
- Slingbox
- TiVo digital video recorders
- LocationFree Player
- Home theater PC
- Telly (home entertainment server)
