= TV gateway =

A TV gateway (also called network TV tuner) is a television headend to a network UPnP router that receives live digital video broadcast (DVB) MPEG transport streams (channels) from terrestrial aerials, satellite dishes, or cable feeds and converts them into IP streams for distribution over an IP network.

TV gateways allow users to stream broadcast live TV content to connected devices on the IP network, including tablets, smartphones, computers, gaming consoles and smart tvs. They also allow multiple users to watch and record different channels at the same time.

The device offers multi-platform, multi-screen broadcast television with live TV content and HD channels.

== Digital TV signals used in TV gateways ==
Most TV gateways support free-to-air (FTA) television services found in many countries. These include services such as Freeview and Freesat in the United Kingdom, TNT in France and TDT in Spain, and basic cable packages in Germany, Switzerland, Austria, and others.

A few TV gateways also support third party conditional access modules (CAMs) for premium pay TV channels, which are transmitted by using a CAM CI card provided by the broadcasters or by third party manufacturers to access their TV service.

Source	Europe	USA	Japan/Latin America
Terrestrial / Aerial	DVB-T, DVB-T2	ATSC	ISDB-T
Satellite	DVB-S, DVB-S2	DVB-S, DVB-S2	ISDB-S
Cable	DVB-C, DVB-C2	ATSC, Clear QAM	ISDB-C

== Uses ==
While many first-generation TV gateways support only one channel or a limited number of channels, modern TV gateways provide multiple TV tuners that can process several channels simultaneously. The more channels a TV gateway provides the more users it can service at the same time. Modern TV gateways also allow users to record TV programs to a USB flash drive, or external hard disk and in some cases, shared folders or network attached storage (NAS).

== Electronic program guide ==
An electronic program guide (EPG) is like a traditional TV listing magazine but available online or on a TV service like aerial, satellite or cable. It allows viewers to find out what shows will air and search for programs they’d like to watch. EPG's also allow users to set reminders and record shows automatically.

Most TV gateways with PVR functionality offer EPG data. This can be free of charge for data processed from the broadcaster's TV stream (according to standard DVB EN 300 468 and technical specification TS 101 211) or via a paid service provided by a third party online EPG provider.

== Whole house DVR ==
Whole house HD-digital video recorder allows users to record programs on a centralized TV gateway DVR and then watch them on any device connected to their home network.

TV gateways with whole house HD-DVR require storage to record live TV programs or schedule future recordings using the EPG.

Whole house DVR TV gateways use a number of storage mediums to store recordings:

- Attached USB storage such as removable HDD or USB flash drives
- Network Windows shared folder
- Network attached storage (NAS)

== Streaming protocols ==
Unicast (HTTP) protocols are mainly used in consumer grade TV gateways to provide a small number of simultaneous users with the flexibility to view multiple channels.

Multicast (UDP), is mainly used in professional-grade TV gateways to enable efficient broadcast of a preset number of channels to a large number of simultaneous viewers. Multicast TV gateways are used primarily by IPTV broadcasters, hotels, hospitals, and digital signage applications.

== Discovery protocols ==
Universal plug and play (UPnP) is a set of communication protocols that permits network devices, to seamlessly discover each other's presence on the network and establish functional network services for data sharing, communications, and entertainment.

M3U - The m3u8 file format is a de facto standard playlist format suitable for carrying lists of media file URLs. Advanced TV gateways use M3U in addition to UPnP to offer better application support, allowing for faster channel zapping and provide a preset channel list.
