= XMLTV =

File format for describing TV listings

XMLTV is an XML based file format for describing TV listings, which has been introduced in 2002. IPTV providers use XMLTV as the base reference template in their systems, and extend it internally according to their business needs.

== See also ==
- MythTV
