= Digital video recorder =

Electronic device

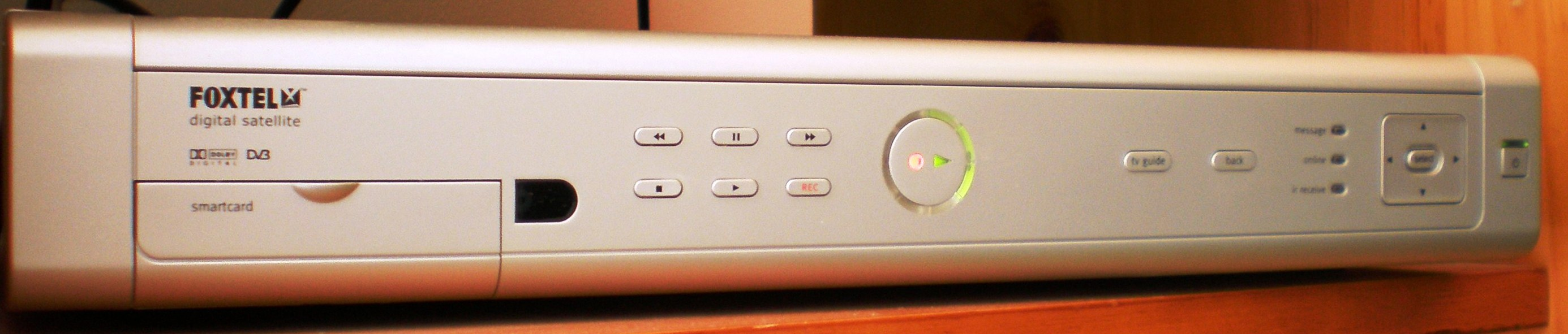
Foxtel IQ, a combined digital video recorder and cable TV receiver (set-top box)

A digital video recorder (DVR), also referred to as a personal video recorder (PVR) particularly in Canadian and British English, is an electronic device that records video in a digital format to a disk drive, USB flash drive, SD memory card, SSD or other local or networked mass storage device. The term includes set-top boxes (STB) with direct to disk recording, portable media players and TV gateways with recording capability, and digital camcorders. Personal computers can be connected to video capture devices and used as DVRs; in such cases the application software used to record video is an integral part of the DVR. Many DVRs are classified as consumer electronic devices. Similar small devices with built-in (~5 inch diagonal) displays and SSD support may be used for professional film or video production, as these recorders often do not have the limitations that built-in recorders in cameras have, offering wider codec support, the removal of recording time limitations and higher bitrates.

== History ==
In the 1980s, prototype high-definition (HD) digital video recorders were developed by Fujitsu, Hitachi, Sanyo and Canon Inc. In 1985, Hitachi demonstrated a prototype digital video tape recorder (VTR) that used digital recording video tape as storage media to record digital HD video content. In 1987, the first commercial digital video recorder was the Sony DVR-1000, a digital video cassette recorder (VCR) that recorded digital video content on D-1 (Sony) digital video cassettes.

=== Hard-disk-based DVR ===
In early 1995, Tektronix introduced the "Profile" series PDR100 Video Disk Recorder, which recorded and played back video stored on hard disk as motion JPEG. In 1996, Sweden's TV4 used the PDR100 extensively in building a new facility in Stockholm, and NBC used PDR100s at the Olympic games in Atlanta Georgia. The Tektronix Profile disk recorder won an Engineering, Science & Technology Emmy Award for "Outstanding Achievement in Engineering Development" at the 1996 Primetime Emmy Awards. In 1997 the U.S. Patent Office granted Tektronix patent 5,642,497 for two claims key to Profile. In 1998, Tektronix introduced two Profile models which were combined VDRs and file servers: the PDR200 and PDR300. The PDR300 stored its compressed video as MPEG-2 (ISO/IEC 13818-2)

A working disk-based DVR prototype was developed in 1998 at Stanford University Computer Science department. The DVR design was a chapter of Edward Y. Chang's PhD dissertation, supervised by Professors Hector Garcia-Molina and Jennifer Widom. Two design papers were published at the 1998 VLDB conference, and the 1999 ICDE conference. The prototype was developed in 1998 at Pat Hanrahan's CS488 class: Experiments in Digital Television, and the prototype was demoed to industrial partners including Sony, Intel, and Apple.

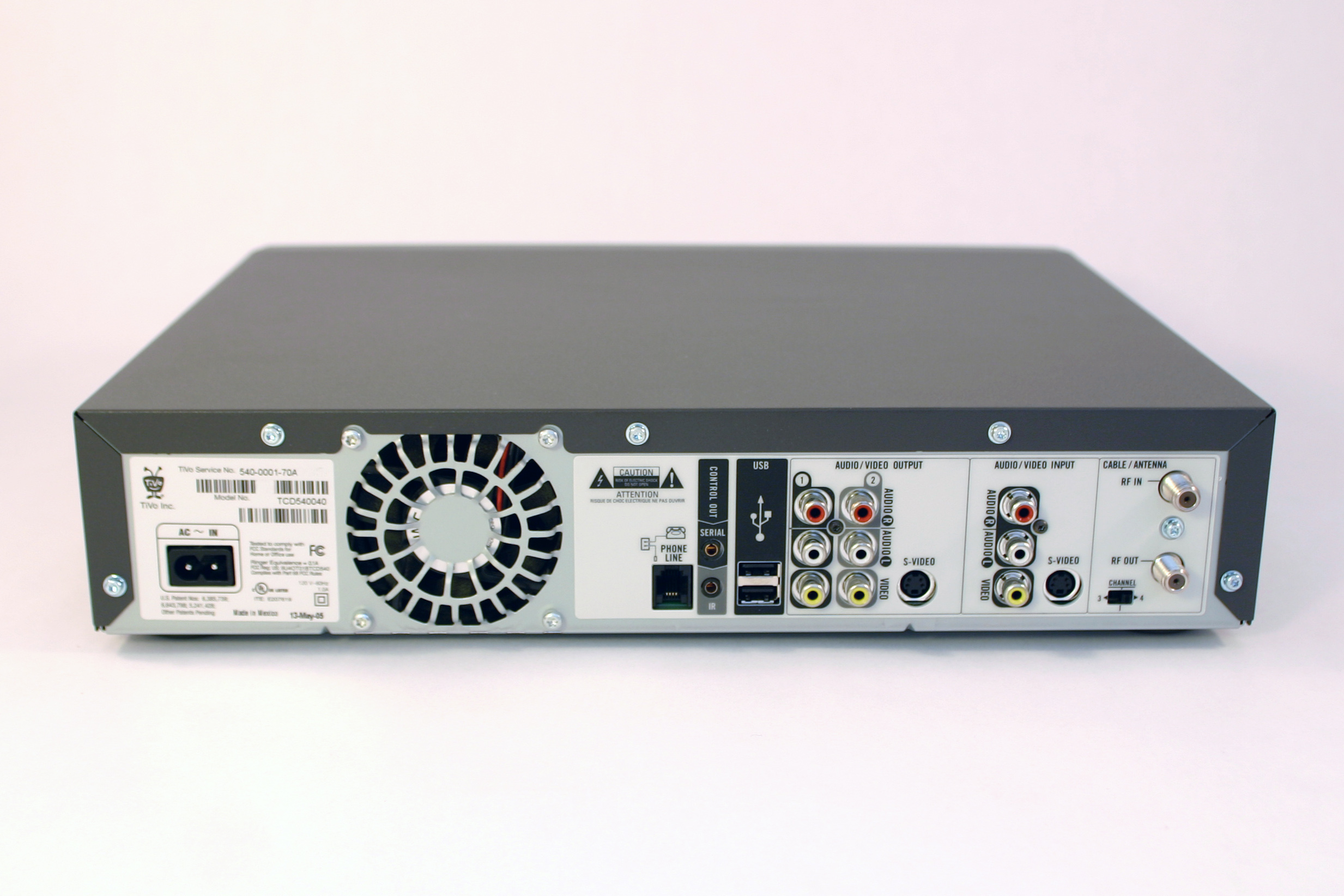
Back view of a TiVo Series2 5xx-generation unit

Consumer digital video recorders ReplayTV and TiVo were launched at the 1999 Consumer Electronics Show in Las Vegas, Nevada. Microsoft also demonstrated a unit with DVR capability, but this did not become available until the end of 1999 for full DVR features in Dish Network's DISHplayer receivers. TiVo shipped their first units on March 31, 1999. ReplayTV won the "Best of Show" award in the video category with Netscape co-founder Marc Andreessen as an early investor and board member, but TiVo was more successful commercially. Ad Age cited Forrester Research as saying that market penetration by the end of 1999 was "less than 100,000".

In 2001, Toshiba introduced a combination DVR that allows video recording on both DVD recordable and hard disk drive.

Legal action by media companies forced ReplayTV to remove many features such as automatic commercial skip and the sharing of recordings over the Internet, but newer devices have steadily regained these functions while adding complementary abilities, such as recording onto DVDs and programming and remote control facilities using PDAs, networked PCs, and Web browsers.

In contrast to VCRs, hard-disk based digital video recorders make "time shifting" more convenient and also allow for functions such as pausing live TV, instant replay, chasing playback (viewing a recording before it has been completed) and skipping over advertising during playback.

Many DVRs use the MPEG format for compressing the digital video. Video recording capabilities have become an essential part of the modern set-top box, as TV viewers have wanted to take control of their viewing experiences. As consumers have been able to converge increasing amounts of video content on their set-tops, delivered by traditional 'broadcast' cable, satellite and terrestrial as well as IP networks, the ability to capture programming and view it whenever they want has become a must-have function for many consumers.

=== DVR tied to video service ===
At the 1999 CES, Dish Network demonstrated the hardware that would later have DVR capability with the assistance of Microsoft software, which also included access to the WebTV service. By the end of 1999 the Dishplayer had full DVR capabilities and within a year, over 200,000 units were sold.

In the UK, digital video recorders are often referred to as "plus boxes" (such as BSKYB's Sky+ and Virgin Media's V+ which integrates an HD capability, and the subscription free Freesat+ and Freeview+). Freeview+ have been around in the UK since the late 2000s, although the platform's first DVR, the Pace Twin, dates to 2002. British Sky Broadcasting marketed a popular combined receiver and DVR as Sky+, now replaced by the Sky Q box. TiVo launched a UK model in 2000, and is no longer supported, except for third party services, and the continuation of TiVo through Virgin Media in 2010. South African based Africa Satellite TV beamer Multichoice recently launched their DVR which is available on their DStv platform. In addition to ReplayTV and TiVo, there are a number of other suppliers of digital terrestrial (DTT) DVRs, including Technicolor SA, Topfield, Fusion, Commscope, Humax, VBox Communications, AC Ryan Playon and Advanced Digital Broadcast (ADB).

Many satellite, cable and IPTV companies are incorporating digital video recording functions into their set-top box, such as with DirecTiVo, DISHPlayer/DishDVR, Scientific Atlanta Explorer 8xxx from Time Warner, Total Home DVR from AT&T U-verse, Motorola DCT6412 from Comcast and others, Moxi Media Center by Digeo (available through Charter, Adelphia, Sunflower, Bend Broadband, and soon Comcast and other cable companies), or Sky+. Astro introduced their DVR system, called Astro MAX, which was the first PVR in Malaysia but was phased out two years after its introduction.

In the case of digital television, there is no encoding necessary in the DVR since the signal is already a digitally encoded MPEG stream. The digital video recorder simply stores the digital stream directly to disk. Having the broadcaster involved with, and sometimes subsidizing, the design of the DVR can lead to features such as the ability to use interactive TV on recorded shows, pre-loading of programs, or directly recording encrypted digital streams. It can, however, also force the manufacturer to implement non-skippable advertisements and automatically expiring recordings.

In the United States, the FCC has ruled that starting on July 1, 2007, consumers will be able to purchase a set-top box from a third-party company, rather than being forced to purchase or rent the set-top box from their cable company. This ruling only applies to "navigation devices", otherwise known as a cable television set-top box, and not to the security functions that control the user's access to the content of the cable operator. The overall net effect on digital video recorders and related technology is unlikely to be substantial as standalone DVRs are currently readily available on the open market.

In Europe Free-To-Air and Pay TV TV gateways with multiple tuners have whole house recording capabilities allowing recording of TV programs to Network Attached Storage or attached USB storage, recorded programs are then shared across the home network to tablet, smartphone, PC, Mac, Smart TV.

=== Introduction of dual tuners ===
In 2003 many Satellite and Cable providers introduced dual-tuner digital video recorders. In the UK, BSkyB introduced their first PVR Sky+ with dual tuner support in 2001. These machines have two independent tuners within the same receiver. The main use for this feature is the capability to record a live program while watching another live program simultaneously or to record two programs at the same time, possibly while watching a previously recorded one. Kogan.com introduced a dual-tuner PVR in the Australian market allowing free-to-air television to be recorded on a removable hard drive. Some dual-tuner DVRs also have the ability to output to two separate television sets at the same time. The PVR manufactured by UEC (Durban, South Africa) and used by Multichoice and Scientific Atlanta 8300DVB PVR have the ability to view two programs while recording a third using a triple tuner.

Where several digital subchannels are transmitted on a single RF channel, some PVRs can record two channels and view a third, so long as all three subchannels are on two channels (or one).

In the United States, DVRs were used by 32 percent of all TV households in 2009, and 38 percent by 2010, with viewership among 18- to 40-year-olds 40 percent higher in homes that have them.

== Types ==
=== Integrated television sets ===
Side view of an LCD monitor with built-in DVR

DVRs are integrated into some television sets (TVs). These systems simplify wiring and operation because they employ a single power cable, have no interconnected ports (e.g., HDMI), and share a common remote control.

=== VESA compatibility ===
Underside of a VESA-compatible DVR

VESA-compatible DVRs are designed to attach to the VESA mounting holes (100×100 mm) on the back of an LCD television set (TV), allowing users to combine the TV and DVR into an integrated unit.

=== Set-top boxes (STB) ===
Over-the-air DVRs are standalone receivers that record broadcast television programs. Several companies have launched over-the-air DVR products for the consumer market over the past few years.

Some pay-TV operators provide receivers that allow subscribers to attach their own network-attached storage (NAS) hard drives or solid-state or flash memory to record video and other media files (e.g., audio and photos).

=== PC-based ===
Software and hardware are available which can turn personal computers running Microsoft Windows, Linux, and Mac OS X into DVRs, and is a popular option for home-theater PC (HTPC) enthusiasts.

==== Linux ====
There are many free and open source software DVR applications available for Linux. For example, TV gateway interfaces to DVB tuners and provides network tuner and TV server functions, which allows live viewing and recording over IP networks. Other examples include MythTV, Video Disk Recorder (VDR), LinuxMCE, TiVo, VBox Home TV Gateway, and Kodi (formerly XBMC).

==== macOS ====
Geniatech makes a series of digital video recording devices called EyeTV. The software supplied with each device is also called EyeTV, and is available separately for use on compatible third-party tuners from manufacturers such as Pinnacle, TerraTec, and Hauppauge.

SageTV provided DVR software for the Mac but no longer sells it. Previously sold devices support the Hauppauge HVR-950, myTV.PVR and HDHomeRun hardware with its DVR software. SageTV software also included the ability to watch YouTube and other online video with a remote control.

MythTV (see above) also runs under Mac OS X, but most recording devices are currently only supported under Linux. Precompiled binaries are available for the MythTV front-end, allowing a Mac to watch video from (and control) a MythTV server running under Linux.

Apple provides applications in the FireWire software developer kit which allow any Mac with a FireWire port to record the MPEG2 transport stream from a FireWire-equipped cable box (for example: Motorola DCT62xx, including HD streams). Applications can also change channels on the cable box via the firewire interface. Only broadcast channels can be recorded as the rest of the channels are encrypted. FireRecord (formerly iRecord) is a free scheduled-recording program derived from this SDK.

==== Windows ====
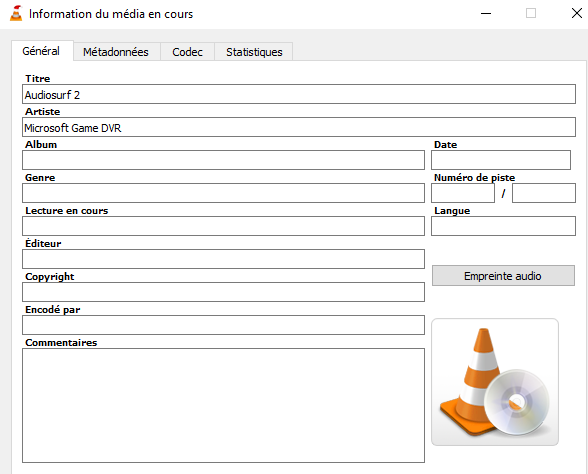
A screenshot of VLC media player showing the metadata of a digital recording of the game Audiosurf 2. Note the "Microsoft Game DVR" as the artist.

There are several free digital video recording applications available for Microsoft Windows including GB-PVR, MediaPortal, and Orb (web-based remote interface).

There are also several commercial applications available including CyberLink, SageTV (which is no longer available after Google acquired it in June 2011), Beyond TV (which is considered discontinued despite an official announcement from SnapStream since the last update was October 2010 and they are concentrating on their enterprise search products), DVBViewer, Showshifter, InterVideo WinDVR, the R5000-HD and Meedio (now a dead product – Yahoo! bought most of the company's technology and discontinued the Meedio line, and rebranded the software Yahoo! Go – TV, which is now a free product but only works in the U.S.). Most TV tuner cards come bundled with software which allows the PC to record television to hard disk. See TV tuner card. For example, Leadtek's WinFast DTV1000 digital TV card comes bundled with the WinFast PVR2 software, which can also record analog video from the card's composite video input socket.

Windows Media Center is a DVR software by Microsoft which was bundled with the Media Center edition of Windows XP, the Home Premium / Ultimate editions of Windows Vista, as well as most editions of Windows 7. When Windows 8 was released in 2012, Windows Media Center was not included with Windows 8 OEM or Retail installations, and was only available as a $15 add-on pack (including DVD Playback codecs) to Windows 8 Pro users. Although Windows Media Center has not been supported by Microsoft since Windows 8, unofficial versions are available for use with Windows 10 and Windows 11. While only the DVR function remains, it is still extremely popular due to its simplicity, ease of use and compatibility with nearly all tuners.

The Windows Game Bar specifies all recordings made by it as being titled "Microsoft Game DVR" followed by the game or application's title.

=== Embeddable ===
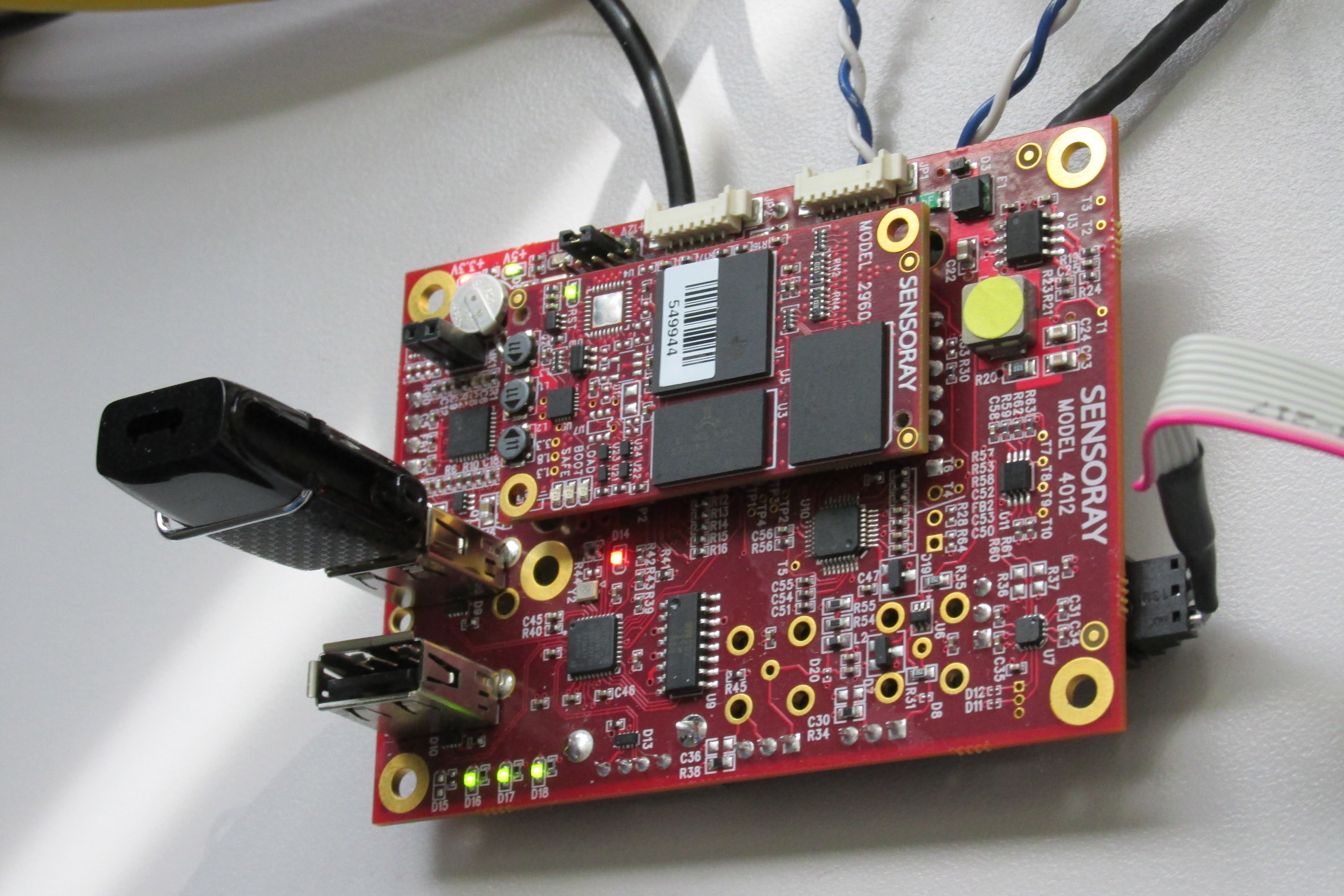
Embeddable DVR with incremental encoder interface for position tracking

An embeddable DVR is a standalone device that is designed to be easily integrated into more complex systems. It is typically supplied as a compact, bare circuit board that facilitates mounting it as a subsystem component within larger equipment. The control keypad is usually connected with a detachable cable, to allow it to be located on the system's exterior while the DVR circuitry resides inside the equipment.

== Source video ==
Television and video are terms that are sometimes used interchangeably, but differ in their technical meaning. Video is the visual portion of television, whereas television is the combination of video and audio modulated onto a carrier frequency (i.e., a television channel) for delivery. Most DVRs can record both video and audio.

=== Analog sources ===
The first digital video recorders were designed to record analog television in NTSC, PAL or SECAM formats.

To record an analog signal a few steps are required. In the case of a television signal, a television tuner must first demodulate the radio frequency signal to produce baseband video. The video is then converted to digital form by a frame grabber, which converts each video image into a collection of numeric values that represent the pixels within the image. At the same time, the audio is also converted to digital form by an analog-to-digital converter running at a constant sampling rate. In many devices, the resulting digital video and audio are compressed before recording to reduce the amount of data that will be recorded, although some DVRs record uncompressed data. When compression is used, video is typically compressed using formats such as H.264 or MPEG-2, and audio is compressed using AAC or MP3.

==== Analog broadcast copy protection ====
Many consumer DVRs implement a copy-protection system called Copy Generation Management System—Analog (CGMS-A), which specifies one of four possible copy permissions by means of two bits encoded in the vertical blanking interval:

- Copying is freely allowed
- Copying is prohibited
- Only one copy of this material may be made
- This is a copy of material for which only one copy was allowed to be made, so no further copies are allowed.

CGMS-A information may be present in analog broadcast TV signals, and is preserved when the signal is recorded and played back by analog VCRs. VCRs do not understand the meanings of the bits but preserve them in case there is a subsequent attempt to copy the tape to a DVR.

DVRs such as TiVo also detect and act upon analog protection systems such as Macrovision and DCS Copy Protection which were originally designed to block copying on analog VCRs.

=== Digital sources ===
Recording digital signals is generally a straightforward capture of the binary MPEG data being received. No expensive hardware is required to quantize and compress the signal (as the television broadcaster has already done this in the studio).

DVD-based PVRs available on the market as of 2006 are not capable of capturing the full range of the visual signal available with high-definition television (HDTV). This is largely because HDTV standards were finalized at a later time than the standards for DVDs. However, DVD-based PVRs can still be used (albeit at reduced visual quality) with HDTV since currently available HDTV sets also have standard A/V connections.

==== ATSC broadcast ====
ATSC television broadcasting is primarily used in North America. The ATSC data stream can be directly recorded by a digital video recorder, though many DVRs record only a subset of this information (that can later be transferred to DVD). An ATSC DVR will also act as a set-top box, allowing older televisions or monitors to receive digital television.

===== Copy protection =====
The U.S. FCC attempted to limit the abilities of DVRs with its "broadcast flag" regulation. Digital video recorders that had not won prior approval from the FCC for implementing "effective" digital rights management would have been banned from interstate commerce from July 2005, but the regulation was struck down on May 6, 2005.

==== DVB ====
DVB digital television contains audio/visual signals that are broadcast over the air in a digital rather than analog format. The DVB data stream can be directly recorded by the DVR. Devices that can use external storage devices (such as hard disks, SSDs, or other flash storage) to store and recover data without the aid of another device are sometimes called telememory devices.

==== Digital cable and satellite television ====
Recording satellite television or digital cable signals on a digital video recorder can be more complex than recording analog signals or broadcast digital signals. There are several different transmission schemes, and the video streams may be encrypted to restrict access to subscribers only.

A satellite or cable set-top box both decrypts the signal if encrypted, and decodes the MPEG stream into an analog signal for viewing on the television. In order to record cable or satellite digital signals the signal must be captured after it has been decrypted but before it is decoded; this is how DVRs built into set-top boxes work.

Cable and satellite providers often offer their own digital video recorders along with a service plan. These DVRs have access to the encrypted video stream, and generally enforce the provider's restrictions on copying of material even after recording.

==== DVD ====
Many DVD-based DVRs have the capability to copy content from a source DVD (ripping). In the United States, this is prohibited under the Digital Millennium Copyright Act if the disc is encrypted. Most such DVRs will therefore not allow recording of video streams from encrypted movie discs.

==== Digital camcorders ====
A digital camcorder combines a camera and a digital video recorder.

Some DVD-based DVRs incorporate connectors that can be used to capture digital video from a camcorder. Some editing of the resulting DVD is usually possible, such as adding chapter points.

Some digital video recorders can now record to solid state flash memory cards (called flash camcorders). They generally use Secure Digital cards, can include wireless connections (Bluetooth and Wi-Fi), and can play SWF files. There are some digital video recorders that combine video and graphics in real time to the flash card, called DTE or "direct to edit". These are used to speed-up the editing workflow in video and television production, since linear videotapes do not then need to be transferred to the edit workstation (see Non-linear editing system).

== File formats, resolutions and file systems ==
DVRs can usually record and play H.264, MPEG-4 Part 2, MPEG-2 .mpg, MPEG-2 .TS, VOB and ISO images video, with MP3 and AC3 audio tracks. They can also display images (JPEG and PNG) and play music files (MP3 and Ogg).

Some devices can be updated to play and record in new formats. DVRs usually record in proprietary file systems for copy protection, although some can use FAT file systems. Recordings from standard-definition television usually have 480p/i/576p/i while HDTV is usually in 720p/1080i.

== Applications ==
=== Security ===
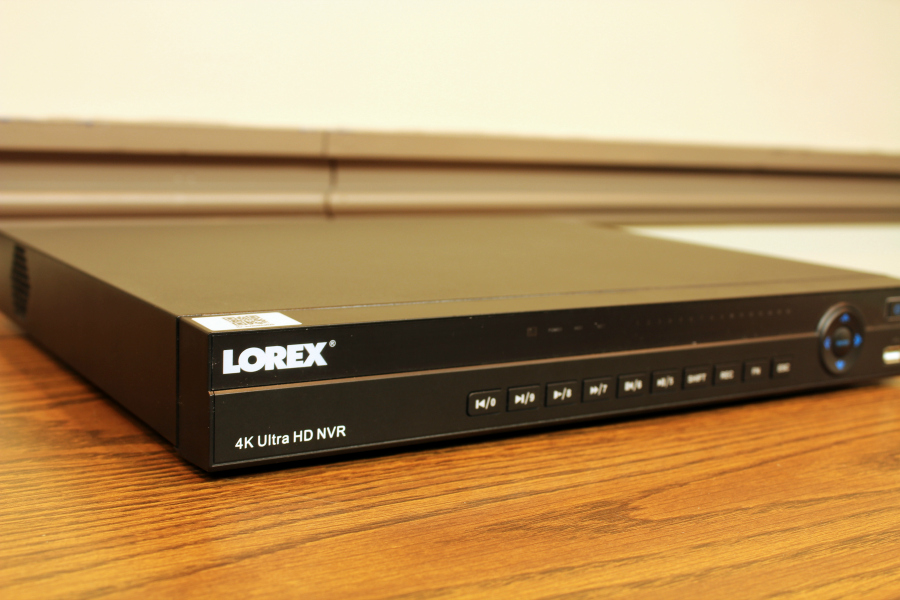
Lorex 4K NVR, a security digital video recorder

Digital video recorders configured for physical security applications record video signals from closed-circuit television cameras for detection and documentation purposes. Many are designed to record audio as well. DVRs have evolved into devices that are feature rich and provide services that exceed the simple recording of video images that was previously done through VCRs. A DVR CCTV system provides a multitude of advanced functions over VCR technology including video searches by event, time, date and camera. There is also much more control over quality and frame rate allowing disk space usage to be optimized and the DVR can also be set to overwrite the oldest security footage should the disk become full. In some DVR security systems remote access to security footage using a PC can also be achieved by connecting the DVR to a LAN network or the Internet. Some of the latest professional digital video recorders include video analytics firmware, to enable functionality such as 'virtual tripwire' or even the detection of abandoned objects on the scene.

Security DVRs may be categorized as being either PC-based or embedded. A PC-based DVR's architecture is a classical personal computer with video capture cards designed to capture video images. An embedded type DVR is specifically designed as a digital video recorder with its operating system and application software contained in firmware or read-only memory.

Safety DVRs are also being used in vehicles, with the latest technology combining various methods to achieve intelligent functions; for example, combining with G sensor technology to achieve real-time collision locking in car collisions, providing a realistic reconstruction of traffic accidents.

==== Hardware features ====
Hardware features of security DVRs vary between manufacturers and may include but are not necessarily limited to:

- Designed for rack mounting or desktop configurations.
- Single or multiple video inputs with connector types consistent with the analogue or digital video provided such as coaxial cable, twisted pair or optical fiber cable. The most common number of inputs are 1, 2, 4, 8, 16 and 32. Systems may be configured with a very large number of inputs by networking or bussing individual DVRs together.
- Looping video outputs for each input which duplicates the corresponding input video signal and connector type. These output signals are used by other video equipment such as matrix switchers, multiplexers, and video monitors.
- Controlled outputs to external video display monitors.
- Front panel switches and indicators that allow the various features of the machine to be controlled.
- Network connections consistent with the network type and utilized to control features of the recorder and to send and/or receive video signals.
- Connections to external control devices such as keyboards.
- A connection to external pan-tilt-zoom drives that position cameras.
- Internal CD, DVD, VCR devices typically for archiving video.
- Connections to external storage media.
- Alarm event inputs from external security detection devices, usually one per video input.
- Alarm event outputs from internal detection features such as motion detection or loss of video.

==== Software features ====
Software features vary between manufacturers and may include but are not necessarily limited to:

- User-selectable image capture rates either on an all input basis or input by input basis. The capture rate feature may be programmed to automatically adjust the capture rate on the occurrence of an external alarm or an internal event
- Selectable image resolution either on an all input basis or input by input basis. The image resolution feature may be programmed to automatically adjust the image resolution on the occurrence of an external alarm or an internal event.
- Compression methods determine quality of playback. H.264 hardware compression offers fast transfer rates over the Internet with high quality video.
- Motion detection: Provided on an input by input basis, this feature detects motion in the total image or a user definable portion of the image and usually provides sensitivity settings. Detection causes an internal event that may be output to external equipment and/or be used to trigger changes in other internal features.
- Lack of motion detection. Provided on an input by input basis, this feature detects the movement of an object into the field of view and remaining still for a user definable time. Detection causes an internal event that may be output to external equipment and/or used to trigger changes in other internal features.
- Direction of motion detection. Provided on an input by input basis, this feature detects the direction of motion in the image that has been determined by the user as an unacceptable occurrence. Detection causes an internal event that may be output to external equipment and/or be used to trigger changes in other internal features.
- Routing of input video to video monitors based on user inputs or automatically on alarms or events.
- Input, time and date stamping.
- Alarm and event logging on appropriate video inputs.
- Alarm and event search.
- One or more sound recording channels.
- Archival.

== Privacy concerns ==
Some (very few), but certainly not all, digital video recorders which are designed to send information to a service provider over a telephone line or Internet (or any other way) can gather and send real-time data on users' viewing habits. This problem was noted back in 2000 and was still considered a problem, specifically with TiVo, in 2015.

== Television advertisements ==
Digital video recorders are also changing the way television programs advertise products. Watching pre-recorded programs allows users to fast-forward through commercials, and some technology allows users to remove commercials entirely. Half of viewers in the United States, for example, use DVRs to skip commercials entirely. This feature has been controversial for the last decade, with major television networks and movie studios claiming it violates copyright and should be banned.

In 1985, an employee of Honeywell's Physical Sciences Center, David Rafner, first described a drive-based DVR designed for home TV recording, time shifting, and commercial skipping. U.S. Patent 4,972,396 focused on a multi-channel design to allow simultaneous independent recording and playback. Broadly anticipating future DVR developments, it describes possible applications such as streaming compression, editing, captioning, multi-channel security monitoring, military sensor platforms, and remotely piloted vehicles.

In 1999, the first DVR which had a built-in commercial skipping feature was introduced by ReplayTV at the Consumer Electronics Show in Las Vegas. In 2002, five owners of the ReplayTV DVR sued the main television networks and movie studios, asking the federal judge to uphold consumers' rights to record TV shows and skip commercials, claiming that features such as commercial skipping help parents protect their kids from excessive consumerism. ReplayTV was purchased by SONICblue in 2001 and in March 2003, SONICblue filed for Chapter 11 bankruptcy after fighting a copyright infringement suit over the ReplayTV's ability to skip commercials. In 2007, DirecTV purchased the remaining assets of ReplayTV. A third-party add-on for Windows Media Center called "DVRMSToolbox" has the ability to skip commercials. There is a command-line program called Comskip that detects commercials in an MPEG-2 file and saves their positions to a text file. This file can then be fed to a program like MEncoder to actually remove the commercials.

Many speculate that television advertisements will be eliminated altogether, replaced by advertising in the TV shows themselves. For example, Extreme Makeover: Home Edition advertises Sears, Kenmore, Kohler, and Home Depot by specifically using products from these companies, and some sports events like the Sprint Cup of NASCAR are named after sponsors.

Another type of advertisement shown more and more, mostly for advertising television shows on the same channel, is where the ad overlays the bottom of the television screen, blocking out some of the picture. "Banners", or "logo bugs", as they are called, are referred to by media companies as Secondary Events (2E). This is done in much the same way as severe weather warnings are done. Sometimes, these take up only 5–10% of the screen, but in the extreme, can take up as much as 25% of the viewing area. Some even make noise or move across the screen. One example of this is the 2E ads for Three Moons Over Milford in the months before its premiere. A video taking up approximately 25% of the bottom-left portion of the screen would show a comet impacting into the moon with an accompanying explosion, during another television program.

Because of this widely used new technology, advertisers are now looking at a new way to market their products on television. An excerpt from the magazine Advertising Age reads: "As advertisers lose the ability to invade the home, and consumer's minds, they will be forced to wait for an invitation. This means that they have to learn what kinds of advertising content customers will actually be willing to seek out and receive."

With ad skipping and the time-sensitive nature of certain ads, advertisers are wary of buying commercial time on shows that are heavily digitally video-recorded. However, technology today makes it possible for networks to insert ads dynamically on videos being played in DVRs. Advertisers could inject time-relevant ads to recorded programs when the program is viewed. This way the ads could be not just topical but also personalized to viewers interests. DirecTV in March 2011 signed an arrangement with NDS Group to enable the delivery of such addressable advertisement. It is believed that viewers prefer to forward ads, than to switch the channel. By switching channels, viewers will have the probability of skipping the beginning of their program. Users might switch to a channel that is also showing ads. Having the ability to pause, rewind, and forward live TV gives users a chance to change the channel fewer times. Forwarding ads can have a later effect on the viewer. Ads that get the viewers' attention will influence the viewers' to rewind and watch what was missed.

In January 2012, Dish Network announced Hopper service, costing $10 extra per month, which recorded prime-time programming from the four major broadcast networks. With the Auto Hop feature, viewers can watch the programs they choose without commercials, without making the effort to fast-forward. On May 24, 2012, Dish and the networks filed suit in federal court.

== Patent and copyright litigation ==
On July 14, 2005, Forgent Networks filed suit against various companies alleging infringement on U.S. patent 6,285,746, entitled "Computer controlled video system allowing playback during recording". The listed companies included EchoStar, DirecTV, Charter Communications, Cox Communications, Comcast, Time Warner, and Cable One.

Scientific-Atlanta and Motorola, the manufacturers of the equipment sold by the above-mentioned companies, filed a counter-suit against Forgent Networks claiming that their products do not violate the patent, and that the patent is invalid. The two cases were combined into case 6:06-cv-208, filed in the United States District Court for the Eastern District of Texas, Tyler Division.

According to court documents, on June 20, 2006, Motorola requested that the United States Patent and Trademarks Office reexamine the patent, which was first filed in 1991, but has been amended several times.

On March 23, 2007, Cablevision Systems Corp lost a legal battle against several Hollywood studios and television networks to introduce a network-based digital video recorder service to its subscribers. However, on August 4, 2008, Cablevision won its appeal. John M. Walker Jr., a Second Circuit judge, declared that the technology "would not directly infringe" on the media companies' rights. An appeal to the Supreme Court was rejected.

In court, the media companies argued that network digital video recorders were tantamount to video-on-demand, and that they should receive license fees for the recording. Cablevision and the appeals court disagreed. The company noted that each user would record programs on his or her own individual server space, making it a DVR that has a "very long cord".

In 2004, TiVo sued EchoStar Corp, a manufacturer of DVR units, for patent infringement. The parties reached a settlement in 2011 wherein EchoStar pays a one-time fee (in three structured payments) that grants Echostar full rights for life to the disputed TiVo patents upon first payment(as opposed to indefinite and escalating license fees to be constantly renegotiated), and Echostar granted TiVo full rights for life to certain Echostar patents and dropped their counter-suit against TiVo.

In January 2012, AT&T settled a similar suit brought by TiVo claiming patent infringement (just as with Echostar) in exchange for cash payments to TiVo totaling $215 million through June 2018 plus "incremental recurring per subscriber monthly license fees" to TiVo through July 2018, but grants no full lifetime rights as per the Echostar settlement.

In May 2012, Fox Broadcasting sued Dish Network, arguing that Dish's set-top box with DVR function, which allowed the users to automatically record prime-time programs and skip commercials, was copyright infringement and breach of contract. In July 2013, the 9th circuit rejected Fox's claims.

== See also ==
- Set-top box
- Home theater PC (Media PC)
- Digital media player
- Smart TV
- Comparison of PVR software packages
- 10-foot user interface
- CRID
- Direct-to-disk recording
- DTE (Direct To Edit)
- DTVPal
- Freeview+
- Freesat+
- Hopper (DVR)
- List of portable software § Recorders
- Media server (Consumer)
- Time shifting
- Space shifting (place shifting)
- Remote storage digital video recorder
- MythTV
- Network video recorder
- SubRip
- Sky+
- Tablo (DVR)
- TiVo
- TV-Anytime
- PVR-resistant advertising
- Remote control
- USB hard disk
- USB On-The-Go
- Vu+
- Video server (Broadcast)
- Kodi (software)
- Xbox One
