= TV tuner card =

Kind of television tuner that allows television signals to be received by a computer

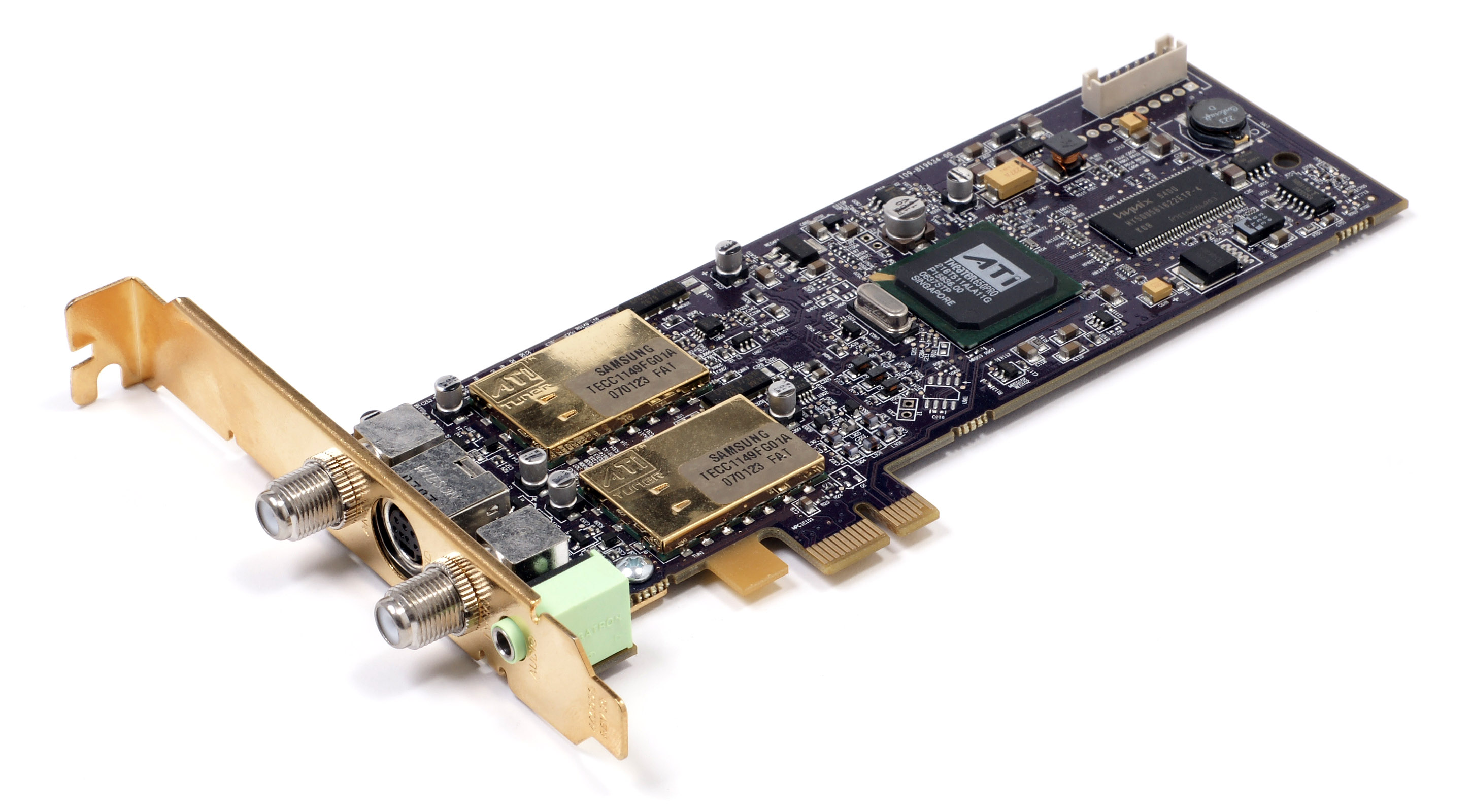
The ATI Twin Wonder TV tuner card

A TV tuner card is a kind of television tuner that allows television signals to be received by a computer. Most TV tuners also function as video capture cards, allowing them to record television programs onto a hard disk much like the digital video recorder (DVR) does.

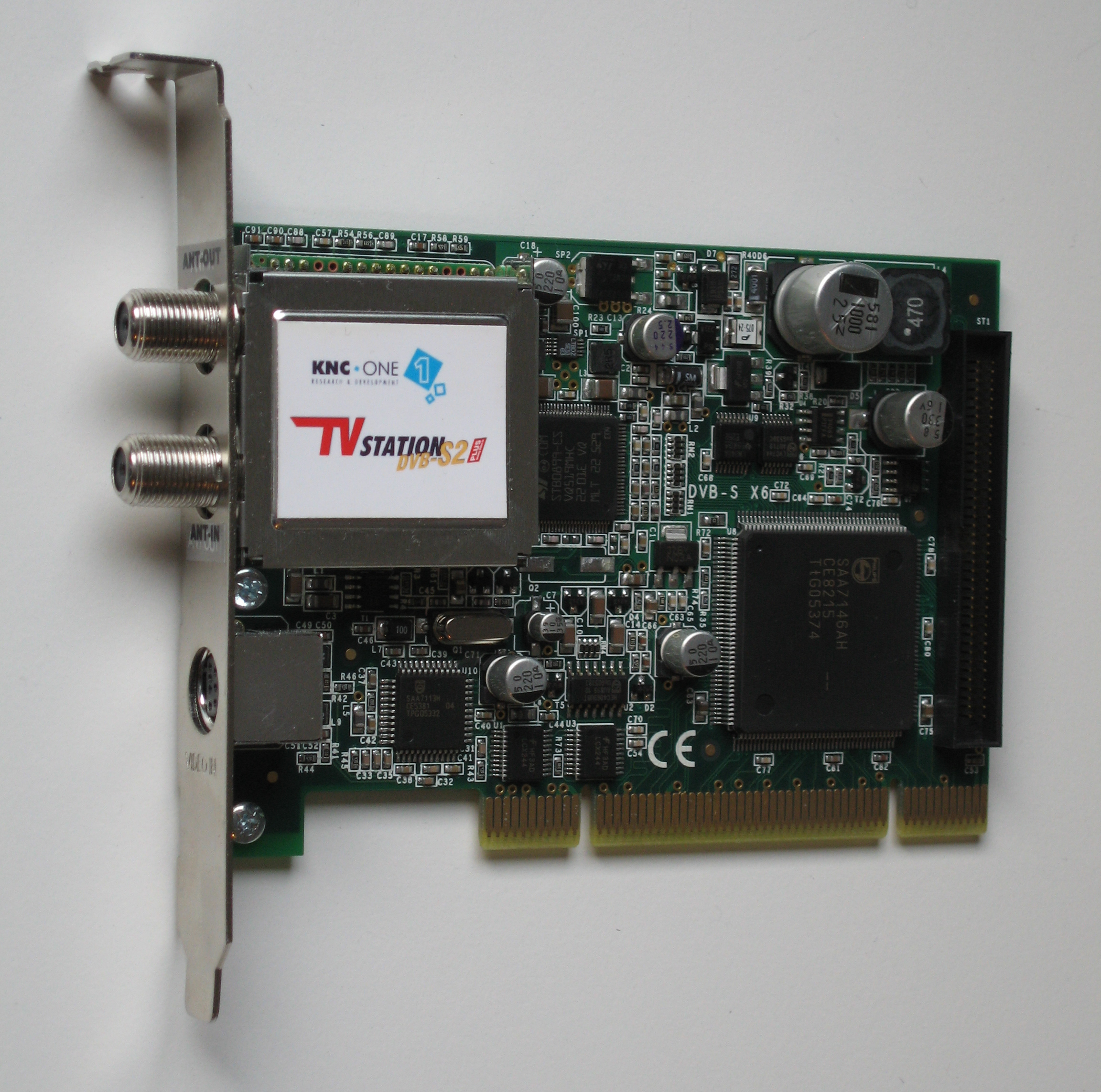
A DVB-S2 tuner card

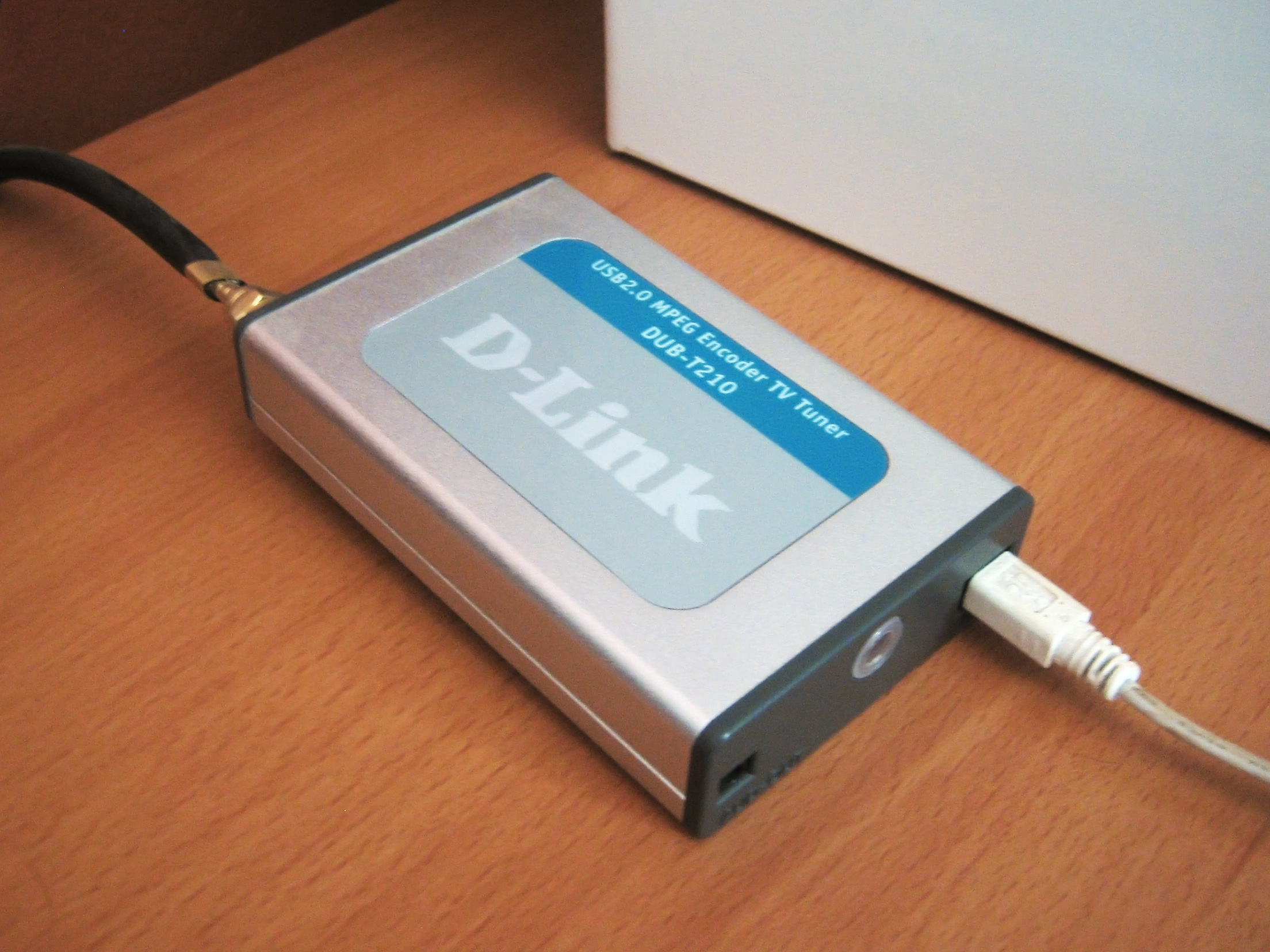
D-Link external TV tuner

The interfaces for TV tuner cards are most commonly either PCI bus expansion card or the newer PCI Express (PCIe) bus for many modern cards, but PCMCIA, ExpressCard, or USB devices also exist. In addition, some video cards double as TV tuners, notably the ATI All-In-Wonder series. The card contains a tuner and an analog-to-digital converter (collectively known as the analog front end) along with demodulation and interface logic. Some lower-end cards lack an onboard processor and, like a Winmodem, rely on the system's CPU for demodulation.

== Types ==
There are many types of tuner cards.

=== Analog tuners ===
Analog television cards output a raw video stream, suitable for real-time viewing but ideally requiring some sort of video compression if it is to be recorded.

Some cards also have analog input (composite video or S-Video) and many also provide a radio tuner.

An early example was the Aapps Corp. MicroTV for Apple Macintosh II, which debuted in 1989.

More-advanced TV tuners encode the signal to Motion JPEG or MPEG, relieving the main CPU of this load.

=== Hybrid tuners ===
A hybrid tuner has one tuner that can be configured to act as an analog tuner or a digital tuner. Switching between the systems is fairly easy, but cannot be done immediately. The card operates as a digital tuner or an analog tuner until reconfigured.

=== Combo tuners ===
This is similar to a hybrid tuner, except there are two separate tuners on the card. One can watch analog while recording digital, or vice versa. The card operates as an analog tuner and a digital tuner simultaneously. The advantages over two separate cards are cost and utilization of expansion slots in the computer. As many regions around the world convert from analog to digital broadcasts, these tuners are gaining popularity.

Like the analog cards, the Hybrid and Combo tuners can have specialized chips on the tuner card to perform the encoding, or leave this task to the CPU. The tuner cards with this 'hardware encoding' are generally thought of as being higher quality. Smaller USB-A tuner sticks became more popular around 2006 and 2007, but generally do not have hardware encoding due to size and heat constraints.

While most TV tuners are limited to the radio frequencies and video formats used in the country of sale, many TV tuners used in computers use DSP, so a firmware upgrade is often all that's necessary to change the supported video format. Many newer TV tuners have flash memory big enough to hold the firmware sets for decoding several different video formats, making it possible to use the tuner in many countries without having to flash the firmware. However, while it is generally possible to flash a card from one analog format to another due to the similarities, it is generally not possible to flash a card from one digital format to another due to differences in decode logic necessary.

== Radio tuners ==
Many TV tuners can function as FM radios; this is because there are similarities between broadcast television and FM radio. The FM radio spectrum is close to (or even inside) that used by VHF terrestrial TV broadcasts. And many broadcast television systems around the world use FM audio. So listening to an FM radio station is simply a case of configuring existing hardware.

== Mobile TV adapter ==
External TV tuner card attachments are available for mobile phones and also smartphones, for watching mobile TV, via TV stations on 1seg in Japan, Latin America and the Philippines. There was also a "converter" for watching DVB-H in Europe and elsewhere via Wi-Fi streaming video (PacketVideo).

== Video capture ==
Video capture cards are a class of video capture devices designed to plug directly into expansion slots in personal computers and servers. Models from many manufacturers are available; all comply with one of the popular host bus standards including PCI, newer PCI Express (PCIe) or AGP bus interfaces.

These cards typically include one or more software drivers to expose the cards' features, via various operating systems, to software applications that further process the video for specific purposes. As a class, the cards are used to capture baseband analog composite video, S-Video, and, in models equipped with tuners, RF modulated video. Some specialized cards support digital video via digital video delivery standards including serial digital interface (SDI) and, more recently, the emerging HDMI standard. These models often support both standard definition (SD) and high definition (HD) variants.

While most PCI and PCI-Express capture devices are dedicated to that purpose, AGP capture devices are usually included with the graphics adapted on the board as an all-in-one package. Unlike video editing cards, these cards tend to not have dedicated hardware for processing video beyond the analog-to-digital conversion. Most, but not all, video capture cards also support one or more channels of audio. New technologies allow PCI-Express and HD-SDI to be implemented on video capture cards at lower costs than before.

An early example is the Mass Microsystems Colorspace FX card from 1989.

=== Applications ===
There are many applications for video capture cards, including converting a live analog source into some type of analog or digital media, (such as VHS-to-DVD conversion), archiving, video editing, scheduled recording (such as a DVR), television tuning, or video surveillance. The cards may have significantly different designs to optimally support each of these functions. A common application of capture cards is making a recording of a video game longplay (LP) for purposes such as gameplay walkthrough videos.

Another of the most popular applications for video capture cards is to capture video and audio for live Internet video streaming. The live stream can also be simultaneously archived and formatted for video on demand (VOD). The capture cards used for this purpose are typically purchased, installed, and configured in host PC systems by hobbyists or systems integrators. Some care is required to select suitable host systems for video encoding, particularly HD applications which are more affected by CPU performance, number of CPU cores, and certain motherboard characteristics that heavily influence capture performance.

== Fall in popularity ==
Around the mid/late 2010s, TV tuners for computers and phones began going out of favor with consumers. The most commonly-speculated reasons for this are the rise of streaming services like Netflix, the removal and deprecation of services such as Windows Media Center, as well as the removal of tuners from traditional cable boxes and televisions.

== See also ==
- Comparison of PVR software packages
- Digital video recorder
- Frame grabber
- TV gateway
