= E2 Linux =

E2 Linux (Enigma 2)
- Developer: Dream Multimedia, OpenPLi, OpenViX, …
- Written in: C++, Python
- OS family: Linux
- Working state: current
- Initial release: 2001
- Latest release: Linux 4.4, Dreambox 2.6
- Package manager: opkg, dpkg
- Supported platforms: ARM, MIPS64, PowerPC
- Kernel type: modular kernel
- Default user interface: graphical Enigma
- Official website: Dream Service GmbH, OpenPLi, OpenViX, …

E2 Linux is an umbrella name for Linux distributions designed to control digital television receivers (DVB-S, DVB-C, and DVB-T), set-top boxes and IPTV receivers. E2 Linux was originally developed for Dreambox receivers, but after 2010 a number of other manufacturers began shipping devices with E2 Linux, including Formuler, GigaBlue, Octagon, Opticum, Unibox, Vu+, and Zgemma.

== History ==
A modification of the Linux operating system, now called E2 Linux, was developed by a group of enthusiasts in the TuxBox project between 2000 and 2001 for the digital satellite receiver DBox2, which was supplied by the German media group Kirch Group for access to the pay satellite station DF1 (later Premiere, then Sky Deutschland). The receiver was supplied with BetaResearch's Betanova firmware, which was based on Sun's ChorusOS and used Java for the user interface. Its responsiveness was slow and its capabilities limited. At least three user interfaces - Neutrino, Lcars (inspired by Star Trek), and Enigma - were developed as part of the TuxBox project, but KirchPayTV went bankrupt in 2002, ending production of the DBox2 receivers. As early as 2003, however, Dream Multimedia (now Dream Service GmbH) picked up the development and introduced the Dreambox 5600, 5620 and 7000 satellite receivers with a 252 MHz PowerPC processor and IBM STB04500 chips. Dream Multimedia chose the enigma interface for its receiver and named the entire operating system after it. In 2006 it developed a new version called enigma2. At that time, many other manufacturers appeared who did not contribute much to the development but competed with Dream Multimedia on price. The company therefore decided to close further development of the system.

== Hardware ==
Devices designed for Enigma2 (i.e. satellite receivers, set-top boxes and IPTV receivers, often collectively referred to as "box") are equipped with one or more DVB-S, DVB-C and DVB-T tuners (unless it is a pure IPTV receiver), a remote control receiver and an Ethernet and/or Wi-Fi network adapter. One or more decoder card slots are available for receiving encrypted programmes. For storing the operating system, the device is usually equipped with flash memory, and a larger hard disk, SSD, USB flash drive or memory card can be connected or inserted for recording programmes or for playing back files. The device can also use network storage or a disk volume on a personal computer using the Samba or NFS protocol. The system is designed to be controlled by a remote control similar to those used for television sets. A television connected to an Enigma device, usually by HDMI (or SCART in older systems) cable, acts as a multimedia monitor. The device can also usually be connected to a home audio system, usually via an S/PDIF interface.

== Software ==
The central application is Enigma2, which implements a graphical user interface (GUI) for controlling DVB receivers. Since many of the devices running E2 Linux have limited internal and external memory sizes, lightweight versions of Linux tools (BusyBox, dropbear, etc.) are usually used, and the OpenEmbedded (OE) environment is used for building. The configuration of the functions needed for system management is implemented as text dialogs.

The system can be accessed using standard terminal emulation programs, ssh or telnet, file-transfer protocols FTP, SFTP and can act as Samba and NFS server and client.

Plugins with additional features, like Kodi, Chromium , HbbTV, may be available in some E2 Linux distributions.

== Current state ==
In 2020, there are dozens of E2 Linux distributions that differ in enigma2 functionality, additional installed software, plugins, etc. Some of the most well-known include OpenATV, OpenViX, OpenPLi, OpenEight, Black Hole, EGAMI, PurE2. They come in the form of a disk image packaged in a ZIP file. The same format is used for complete backups of the entire system; there is also an option to backup only configuration files. Updates can be performed by using the opkg package manager. Dream multimedia no longer uses the name Enigma for the latest versions of its system, but a new system named Drembox OS. Some receivers support Multiboot - the ability to install multiple distributions or different versions of the current distribution, for feature checking and comparison purposes or as a rescue system in case of problems rather than for routine use.

== See also ==
- Enigma (DVB)
- Linux on embedded systems
- OpenEmbedded
- Set-top box
