= Eurovox =

The Eurovox is a Digital Cable set-top box, notoriously known for its ability to decode cable television services without a subscription, which has been imported into the UK from Korea since 2004.

== History ==
The Eurovox product heralded the 'new generation' of proprietary non-Linux based receivers and was designed to fill the market previously occupied by the DBox2 . The DBOX was a Linux-based German cable receiver — which became available through markets like eBay as second-hand receivers in the late 1990s / early 2000s.

Dream Multimedia produced the incredibly popular Linux-based Dreambox 500 receiver - which became the 'unofficial' new DBOX for Linux enthusiasts to enjoy. To ensure maximum market coverage these were available with a variety of tuners allowing the same Dreambox 500 shell to be used in Satellite, Cable and Terrestrial areas.

The ability to manipulate the code on the Dreambox/DBox2 was hugely popular within the UK cable community as it allowed hackers to produce firmware which could decrypt UK cable channels without subscription.

The Eurovox product became the fastest selling 'brand' name non-Linux based receiver in the UK as the huge uptake of free or low priced 'Internet Forums' allowed users across the country to share information about the product.

The Eurovox 2 was initially imported by one individual in the West Midlands. However, the questionable legality coupled with the huge potential market were sufficient to make larger organizations interested in re-branding the earlier product.

In 2005 a rival group headed by Rayyonics Ltd rebranded the product as the Eurovox MAX. Using a dedicated sales force and allowing only selected resellers to acquire the product wholesale, the 'MAX' became the best known 'non-Linux cable receiver' in the UK within a year.

It is believed that over 600,000 units are currently being used in the UK and Ireland.

== Legal Pressure ==
While never explicitly stated, it was widely known that the main purpose of the Eurovox to decrypt free channels from the main UK cable providers of that time (namely Telewest, ntl and Cable & Wireless Communications). The use of the Eurovox (and similar cable receivers - The Starview/Kryptview/Dreambox/ITGate etc.) and many other units of this type is strictly prohibited by Virgin Media's Terms of Service.

Following the merger of ntl and Telewest into NTL:Telewest and subsequently Virgin Media, there has been considerable pressure on importers, re-sellers and individuals trading online to stop the distribution of these units.

== See also ==
- Cable television piracy
- Pirate decryption
