= List of software based on Kodi and XBMC =

This is list of software projects or products that are third-party source code ports, modified forks, or derivative work directly based on Kodi (formerly XBMC), an open source media center application and entertainment platform developed by the non-profit technology consortium XBMC Foundation.

Kodi/XBMC is royalty-free and cross-platform software. The core code is written in C++ and is free and open-source software licensed under GNU General Public License version 2 (GNU GPL v2). It offers the possibility for easy rebranding by an original design manufacturer (ODM) or original equipment manufacturer (OEM), with customizing of interface look and feel using skins, and simple plug-ins from third-party developers, available via Python scripts for content extensions. Thus, many systems integrators have created modified versions of Kodi, along with a just enough operating system (JeOS) that are mostly used as a software appliance suite in a variety of devices including smart TVs, set-top boxes, digital signage, hotel television systems, in-flight entertainment platforms, frontend for pay-TV operators using IPTV or Pay-per-view, and network connected digital media players.

Popular derivative applications and devices such as MediaPortal, Plex, LibreELEC, OpenELEC, ToFu, Boxee, Horizon TV, and PrismCube have all initially been spun off from Kodi’s code base as their main software framework to create new digital ecosystems.

== 9x9 Player for 9x9CloudTV ==
9x9 Player, by Santa Clara, CA based 9x9Network, is an open source software media player client for 9x9Network's 9x9CloudTV peer-to-peer TV delivery network over internet. The frontend of this media player client uses XBMC's source code as its application framework platform, and 9x9Network as a company also used to be an official sponsor of the XBMC development project.

== Boxee ==
Boxee, made by startup company Boxee Inc., is a freeware and partly open source software cross-platform media center and entertainment hub with social networking features that is a commercial fork of XBMC software. Boxee supported Windows, Linux, and OS X, with the first Alpha made available on 16 June 2008. Boxee as a company was a former sponsor of the XBMC development project. The last version was 1.5. There will be no more versions of the desktop versions, with new emphasis on the Boxee Box. Boxee later stopped all development of their XBMC fork with their new hardware box, Boxee TV, which uses closed source software. Boxee as a company also used to be an official sponsor of the official XBMC development project. Boxee will be joining Samsung on 10 July 2013.

== Crystalbuntu ==
Crystalbuntu is an XBMC and Ubuntu-based Linux distribution operating system designed specifically made for and solely optimized for the first-generation Apple TV (a.k.a. the 'silver' Apple TV 1 and ATV1), these software firmware images and XBMC fork is maintained by its main developer, created by Sam Nazarko (who is also the developer of Raspbmc and LinXBMC).

== DVDFab Media Player ==
DVDFab Media Player by Fengtao Software Inc. is a media player software for Windows, based on the XBMC source code. DVDFab Media Player can play encrypted and DRM-protected Blu-ray Discs for 60-days for free before it has to be licensed to enable that feature again. It can however playback unencrypted and Blu-ray ISO-images, folders, and other DRM-free media files without a license.

== E2BMC ==
E2BMC is a XBMC-based software platform for DVR/PVR set-top boxes on-top embedded Linux hardware systems, designed as a hybrid integration between XBMC media center software and Dreambox's Enigma2 PVR software scripts, with OpenPLi (OpenEmbedded based Linux operating system for embedded systems) open source set-top box firmware images. "MK-Digital Cube" and "D-Cube R2" were the two first E2BMC based set-to boxes announced, and both was released in Q1 in 2014.

Mutant HD2400 or Opticum AX Quadbox HD 2400 are two new announced E2BMC box expected to be released in October 2014, and unlike prior ARM SoCs based E2BMC box, these new boxes are based on Broadcom BCM7424 MIPS chips.

The OpenATV Team, known for its community driven firmware images for Enigma2 based set top-boxes from Dreambox and Vu+, has promised to develop third-party OpenATV (also OpenEmbedded based) firmware images with XBMC for E2BMC compatible set-top boxes based on ARM and MIPS architectures.

== EmbER (formerly MX Linux) ==
Embedded Entertainment ROM (EmbER), formerly MX Linux, renamed after merger with the TinyHTPC project, is a free and open-source embedded Linux operating system, designed solely to run Kodi/XBMC Media Center with a minimum JeOS appliance OS on Android set-top boxes based on Amlogic's ARM chipsets. Similar OpenELEC, EmbER ROM images provides a complete media center software suite that comes with a pre-configured version of Kodi/XBMC and third-party addons for hardware management and over-the-air updates.

== EzeeCube by Ezee Systems ==
EzeeCube, by Ezee Systems Limited, is a set-top box media player that has a unique modular design made of stackable units. The hardware is based on Freescale i.MX6 SoC series, the operating-system is a Yocto-based embedded Linux which runs a custom forked version of XBMC/Kodi. It ran a successful crowd-source campaign in the later half of 2014, and finally began shipping the final product in June 2015.

== GeeXboX ==
GeeXboX is a free and open-source Live USB/Live CD based Linux distribution providing a home theater PC (HTPC) software suite for x86 personal and embedded ARM devices. Based on the OpenBricks framework, the GeeXboX distro comes since version 2.0 with a pre-configured version of XBMC media center as its main media player and GUI font-end.

== Horizon TV by Liberty Global ==
Horizon TV by Liberty Global (first-generation Horizon TV only), is a cross-platform media platform and DVB-C 6 tuner high-definition DVR/PVR set-top-box, (with hardware made by Samsung as model SMT-G7400), which runs native XBMC as its main media center GUI interface atop Linux for embedded systems, along with a hidden proprietary middleware framework for video on demand and handling DRM for streaming multimedia. It was first announced in September 2012, and it is also available from Dutch cable operation UPC Netherlands under the brand name "UPC Horizon TV".

Liberty Global, branded as "UPC" in Europe and worldwide better known as simply "Liberty", is since 2013, the world's largest international cable company, with operations in 14 countries, with Horizon TV being its flagship platform with more than 10 million first-generation Horizon TV devices sold.

== LeMedia by LeMaker ==
LeMedia by LeMaker is a Linux-based OS distribution designed that comes with a forked version of Kodi. It is mainly optimized for its Banana Pi, Banana Pro, and LeMaker Guitar single-board-computers (which are built on ARM-based SoCs from Allwinner and Actions Semi). LeMedia OS software firmware image is a fork of Debian Linux.

== LibreELEC ==
Libre Embedded Linux Entertainment Center (LibreELEC) is a non-profit fork of OpenELEC as an open source just enough OS (JeOS) Linux software appliance distro for Kodi. This fork of OpenELEC announced in March 2016 as a split from the OpenELEC team after "creative differences", taking most of its active developers at the time to join the new LibreELEC project.

== MediaPortal ==
MediaPortal is free and open-source software media center written for Microsoft Windows that is initially based on forked XBMC source code by Erwin Beckers (a.k.a. Frodo, who was also one of the original founders of XBMC) in February 2004. The reason for this fork to Microsoft Windows was to get away from hardware and software platform limitations of the Xbox game-console platform that XBMC development started on, mainly because of the Xbox inability to support TV-tuner adapters natively as Erwin wanted PVR functionality. Now after several years and innumerable feature changes there has been almost a complete re-design of the source code, however the skinning engine of MediaPortal 1.X.X still remains very similar to that of the original XBMC software making it relatively easy for people to port skins/themes back and forth between the two projects, something that is done quite frequently.

== MeeGo TV ==
MeeGo TV was the MeeGo TV stack SDK (Software Development Kit) for Smart TV developing platform, as a specialized branch of the MeeGo (Linux-based) open source mobile operating system. This Meego TV stack provided a GPLv2 compatible "OBS Light" (openSUSE's Open Build Service for clients) based SDK that used a derivative fork of XBMC media center software for embedded systems appliance devices. MeeGo and its Smart TV development platform was founded by the Linux Foundation, Intel, and AMD.

== MrMC ==
MrMC is an open source for-profit media player and media center software that is a stripped fork of Kodi, made by former XBMC developers Davilla and Amet and now joined to the project "koying" (the spmc fork developer). So far it has been released for iOS and tvOS as their first platforms, and Android (including Amazon App Store for Fire TV/Fire OS) as its second platform, with plans to also support other platforms such as Linux, OS X, and Tizen, which releases will come later.

== ONEvision by at-visions ==
ONEvision, by at-visions Informationstechnologie GmbH, (an international system integration and IT outsourcing firm for hotels), is a commercial fork of XBMC for use as hotel television system software in hotel environments and in the hospitality industry for in-room entertainment. It offers a platform for in-room service bookings and an IPTV interface, with custom theme branding. ONEvision is currently used throughout Europe and Asia at hotels such as Hyatt EMEA, Ramada Vienna, RIMC International, DWA Bratanki, Rogner International, EH&A, Heritage Hotel Hallstatt, St. Martins Therme, and Heiltherme Bad Waltersdorf. As of October 2010, at-visions as a company is also an official sponsor of the XBMC development project.

== Open Black Hole ==
Open Black Hole is an open source project for making unofficial third-party OpenPLi based images for newer Vu+ set-top boxes. Designed as a hybrid integration between Kodi/XBMC media center software and Dreambox's Enigma2 PVR software scripts, running on an OpenPLi forked from PLi git (which in turn is based on OpenEmbedded Linux operating system for embedded systems), it is as such also fully compatible with PLi plugins and coding infrastructure. The project was first announced on 25 May 2015, and is maintained by the Black Hole Team, a team of independent developers of long popular community driven firmware images for Vu+-based set top-boxes, however these Open Black Hole project images is completely separate from the original Black Hole image for Vu+.

== OpenELEC ==
Open Embedded Linux Entertainment Center (OpenELEC) is a free and open-source embedded operating system providing a complete media center software suite that comes with a pre-configured version of XBMC and third-party addons with retro style video game console emulators and digital video recorder (PVR/DVR) plugins. OpenELEC is a very small and fast booting Linux-based distribution, mainly designed to boot from flash memory card such as CompactFlash or a solid-state drive, similar to that of the XBMC Live distribution, but designed to a minimum set-top box hardware setup based on ARM system on a chip SoC's or Intel x86 processor and graphics.

Over the years OpenELEC have had partnerships and sponsor deals with several media player manufacturers and home theater PC media center system integrates as OEM firmware developers, with OpenELEC maintaining the operating-systems on their hardware.

== OpenPCTV ==
OpenPCTV is a XBMC-based open source Linux distribution for personal computers and embedded system to be used as DVR/PVR set-top boxes and media player appliance boxes. Just like E2BMC, OpenPCTV is also designed as a hybrid integration between XBMC and Dreambox's Enigma2 PVR software scripts, using Video Disk Recorder (VDR) as the TV tuner backend server and OpenBricks based Linux operating system images for embedded systems.

== OSMC (formerly Raspbmc) ==
OSMC (abbreviation taken from "Open Source Media Center"), is the successor to Raspbmc, is a Linux distribution based on Debian and Kodi. It supports a variety of platforms including ARM and x86. It is led by developer Sam Nazarko (who was also the lead developer behind Crystalbuntu and LinXBMC).

== Plex ==
On 21 May 2008, XBMC developer Elan Feingold forked the source code of XBMC and started a new project called Plex, (formerly, this Mac OS X port of XBMC was informally named the OSXBMC project). Feingold said that he would still try to collaborate with most Team-XBMC members behind the scenes and at least try to keep Plex skinning engine compatible with XBMC skins. While Plex began as a free software hobby project, since 2010 it is commercial software (freeware) that is today owned and developed by one for-profit startup company, Plex, Inc., and today parts of what Plex offers is closed source proprietary software. The Linux, Macintosh, and Windows servers and clients are free, and offer their Android and iOS clients for a small one-time charge.

Feingold was the Team-XBMC member who first initiated the Mac OS X port of XBMC, but soon after he left the original XBMC project due to what was arguably a falling-out with rest of Team-XBMC's developer members over the team's priorities feeling that the XBMC project should aim for strict adherence to the GPL and always keep to an open-source software mindset. This disagreement is claimed to be one of the main factors that led Elan to leave the XBMC project and create the Plex fork.

== PrismCube by Marusys ==
PrismCube by Marusys is a DVB-S2 Twin-Tuner high-definition DVR/PVR set top box with true Digital Satellite Equipment Control (DiSEqC) support running native XBMC as its main media center GUI interface atop Linux for embedded systems. Released in October 2013, this first hardware model is marketed as "PrismCube Ruby" in Europe, North Africa, and Middle East, and it is also sold under different brand names such as "Kasys Prismcube Ruby", "AB IPBox Prismcube Ruby", and "Openbox Prismcube Ruby".

PrismCube Ruby firmware image is based on OpenEmbedded-Linux, and uses Marusys's own PVR backend software that integrated itself into XBMC's GUI, so currently the PVR front-end GUI functions and features on PrismCube are not part of native XBMC core code, though they use the same skin texture elements to achieve a somewhat similar look and feel interface, a ported fork which Marusys calls "XBMC4STB" (XBMC for Set-Top-Boxes), which is the same name that Vu+ have given to their XBMC port too. Third-party firmware images for PrismCube Ruby is also being developed by the Black Hole Team, a team of independent developers of long popular community driven firmware images for Vu+-based set top-boxes.

== Qt Media Hub ==
Qt Media Hub, also termed QtMediaHub or Qt MediaHub, by Nokia, is a proof of concept port of XBMC to QML and Qt framework on ARM platforms for the MeeGo, Maemo, and Mer projects, to demonstrate the power and flexibility of using Qt/QML, and also to show the best practices when using Qt/QML.

== RasPlex ==
RasPlex is a Plex client for Linux distributions designed and optimized for the Raspberry Pi and other ARM based systems, like Plex it is a forked version of XBMC. RasPlex has the look and feel of Plex Home Theater. It is mainly designed to be a third-party client for Plex Media Server, but it can be used as a stand-alone media player also. RasPlex is a fork of OpenELEC.

== Rippl-TV ==
Rippl-TV by Rippl-TV Electronics is a development framework and software platform centered around XBMC for Android, (similar to TOFU Media Platform by Pivos). It is designed for both first-party (i.e., media player devices from Rippl-TV Electronics) and also licensed to third-parties (OEM/ODM) and other commercial partners for branding. Marketed as an "entertainment ecosystem" derived from XBMC Media Center, that builds atop an underlying custom Android operating system. Rippl-TV platform consists of "XBMC Rippl-TV Edition" which is a fork of XBMC, and the current version of "UtilOS" is a fork of Android 4.4 (KitKat) firmware.

== Seebo MAXX ==
Seebo MAXX, or MAXX by Seebo, is a DVB-S2 Twin-Tuner high-definition DVR/PVR and IPTV set-top-box running a forked version of XBMC as its main media center GUI interface atop native Linux for embedded systems. Released in October 2014, and initially targeting the Australian market, the hardware specification of the first model includes an Intel Atom dual-core processor, NVIDIA GeForce GT218 graphics, and 500 GB harddrive for storage.

== SPMC ==
SPMC by SemperPax is a fork of XBMC media center software for Android that is mainly maintained by Christian Browet (a.k.a. Koying), who is also a developer on Team-XBMC of the official XBMC for Android. SPMC is basically a plain fork of XBMC 13.x (Gotham), with some minor tweaks specific to various Android devices. The main difference between SPMC and the official upstream XBMC is that SPMC is available to download directly from most Android app stores, such as Google Play, Amazon Appstore, and Ouya App Store. Thus SPMC does not have to be side-loaded like the official upstream XBMC, yet the signature is different from the XBMC one, so both can co-exist on the same device, with separate userdata.

== TOFU Media Center by Pivos ==
TOFU Media Platform by Pivos Technology Group, Inc., is a development framework and software platform based on XBMC for Android, designed for both first-parties (i.e., media player devices from Pivos) and licensed to third parties (OEM) and other commercial partners. Marked as an "entertainment ecosystem" derived from XBMC Media Center, that builds atop underlying embedded operating systems such as Android or Linux variants.

TOFU Media Platform consists of TOFU Media Center which is a fork of XBMC, and the current version of TOFU Media OS is a fork of Android 4.2 (Jellybean). The first commercial third-party device to have official ToFu Media Center (Android version) application support was the GameStick video game console developed by PlayJam. Pivos's own first device that comes with the complete TOFU Media Platform (TOFU Media OS and TOFU Media Center) preloaded is their Pivos XIOS XS media player.

== VidOn Media Center by VidOn.me ==
VidOn.me, or VidOnMe, is a company that maintains a commercial fork and derivative of XBMC media center software, named VidOn Media Center (formerly VidOn XBMC), and other than offering non-XBMC based media player software for iOS and Android, they also sell set-top boxes and Mini PCs with Android 4.x that comes with XBMC pre-installed re-branded under the VidOn.me name. They also offer iOS and Android remote control apps for their VidOn.me media player software, both which the company claim to be fully cross-compatible with remote control apps designed for XBMC and vice versa. VidOn.me is also one of the official sponsors of the XBMC Foundation with annual donation.

== Voddler ==
Voddler was a commercial video-on-demand service and client software streaming movies and television programming, similar to Spotify and Grooveshark, but for video. The company is now defunct since 2018. From its first release at 1 July 2009 up until 24 February 2010, Voddler's media player software was initially based on a fork of the XBMC open source code. Voddler violated the license for XBMC's source code by neglecting to release all of their modifications that they used in their application as required per the GPL, and they have been publicly criticized for this.

Since 8 March 2010 Voddler's media player software is now based on the Adobe Air closed-source application platform.

== XBMC4STB project by Vu+ ==
Vu+, or VuPlus, is made by a Korean multimedia vendor, which is a manufacturer of Linux-based Digital Video Broadcasting (DVB) Satellite (DVB-S), and Terrestrial (DVB-T), digital television receivers (set-top box) with true Digital Satellite Equipment Control (DiSEqC) support that all currently are MIPS-based and uses Enigma2 toolkit software atop a Linux-based operating system as firmware.

In September 2011, Vu+ Day in Amsterdam it was first publicly announced that the next-generation Vu+ DVB satellite receivers to be released publicly in the end of 2012 will be ARM-powered and use XBMC Media Center software for its main GUI, an OpenEmbedded-based development-project that they call XBMC for Set-Top-Boxes (XBMC4STB), with beta releases of both the software and new hardware said to be made available to XBMC developers before they are released to the public.

It took two more years before a native source port of XBMC was available to use on the newer Vu+ (VuPlus) based set-top box models (Vu+ Solo SE, Vu+ Solo 2, and Vu+ Duo 2), with XBMC not being made available for older Vu+ set-top boxes due to hardware limitations regarding missing OpenGL graphics acceleration.

Today third-party firmware images with Kodi/XBMC for these newer set-top boxes are also being developed by the Black Hole Team, the OpenATV team, the VTi team, and the OpenViX (ViX) team independently.

== XBMC4XBox ==
XBMC4Xbox is a third-party developer spin-off project of XBMC, with still active development and support of the Xbox platform. This project was created as a fork of XBMC as a separate project to continue having a version of XBMC for the Xbox hardware platform. It was not started by official members of the official XBMC project, nor will it be supported by the Official Team XBMC in any way. It started when support for the Xbox branch was officially dropped by Team XBMC, which was announced on 27 May 2010.

== yaVDR ==
yaVDR (abbreviation of yet another VDR) is an Ubuntu-based IA-32 (i386) Linux distribution designed for Home Theater PC (HTPC) with TV tuner card for digital video recorder (DVR) abilities. yaVDR comes preinstalled and preconfigured ready-to-use version of XBMC Media Center from the PVR Subversion development branch as its main front-end media player interface, with Video Disk Recorder (VDR) integrated as its PVR back-end server. It also features xine as an alternative front-end media player interface to XBMC.

== ZDMC by Zidoo ==
Zidoo Media Center (ZDMC) by Zidoo is a fork of Kodi (formerly a fork of XBMC) media center software made for Zidoo's own series of Android-based media player hardware boxes, which in turn have so far all been based on Rockchip SoC chipsets. ZDMC fork of Kodi have some additional features for adding Blu-ray 3D decoding and BD-J (Blu-ray menus) as well as some specific platform tweaks for Rockchip SoC chipsets.

== See also ==
- Kodi (software) (formerly XBMC Media Center)
- Comparison of video player software
- Comparison of DVR software packages
- List of smart TV platforms
- Rebranding
- Original design manufacturer (ODM)
- Open design
