= MRMC =

MRMC may stand for:

- United States Army Medical Research and Materiel Command
- Markov Reward Model Checker, a probabilistic model checking tool
- MrMC, an open source for-profit media player software based on Kodi (formerly XBMC Media Center)
