= LocationFree Player =

Remote video streaming server by Sony

Sony LocationFree logo

Sony's LocationFree is the marketing name for a group of products and technologies for timeshifting and placeshifting streaming video. The LocationFree Player is an Internet-based multifunctional device used to stream live television broadcasts (including digital cable and satellite), DVDs and DVR content over a home network or the Internet. It is in essence a remote video streaming server product (similar to the Slingbox). It was first announced by Sony in Q1 2004 and launched early in Q4 2004 alongside a co-branded wireless tablet TV. The last LocationFree product was the LF-V30 released in 2007.

The LocationFree base station connects to a home network via a wired Ethernet cable, or for newer models, via a wireless connection. Up to three attached video sources can stream content through the network to local content provision devices or across the internet to remote devices. A remote user can connect to the internet at a wireless hotspot or any other internet connection anywhere in the world and receive streamed content. Content may only be streamed to one computer at a time. In addition, the original LocationFree Player software contained a license for only one client computer. Additional (paid) licenses were required to connect to the base station for up to a total of four clients.

On November 29, 2007, Sony modified its LocationFree Player policy to provide free access to the latest LocationFree Player LFA-PC30 software for Windows XP/Vista. In addition, the software no longer requires a unique serial number in order to pair it with a LocationFree base station. In December, 2007 Sony Dropped the $30 license fee for the LocationFree client. However, the software still requires registration to Sony's servers after 30 days.

== Clients ==
The player (server) can stream content to the following (client) devices:

- Windows or Mac computer - requires additional software
- Mobile/cellular phones - coming later in 2007
- Pocket PCs running Windows Mobile
- Smartphones/tablets running Android 2.2+
- Televisions - requires a Sony adapter

Sony (Client) Products:

- Sony wireless Tablets (listed below)
- PlayStation Portable (PSP) - system software version 2.50 or later (version 3.11 or later recommended due to inclusion of AVC support)
- Sony Ericsson P990i - European Base Stations only
- Sony VAIO laptops - starting Summer 2007, these laptops included an LF Vaio branded compatible client

These products do not act as DVRs, since they do not allow content to be recorded to a hard drive.

A user can also access and control from anywhere in the world any device connected to the unit, and switch between multiple devices.

== BASE Station Models ==
Base stations packaged with LocationFree Player installation disc and instructional DVD

- LF-PK1 ("PK" stands for "Pack" or "Package" as it is a package of the LF-B1 base station, LFA-PC2 LocationFree player software for the PC and instructional DVD)
  - First standalone model sold without a tablet
  - Only model in the North American market to ever come equipped with an RF coaxial input. However the European model did not have an RF coaxial input.
  - Wireless 11a/b/g. Can also be used as a conventional Wi-fi access point if connected to a wired router via Ethernet.
  - Three firmware versions released. Version 1.000 was the original release version for Japan and North America. Version 2.000 added support for the Sony PSP (with PSP firmware version 2.50 or higher). An update was made available for Japanese and North American owners. Version 3.000 was the original release version for the European version of the LF-PK1 meaning all European models shipped with this latest firmware version. It increased the maximum number of clients that can be registered from 4 to 8. It also enhanced the way settings were changed through the web interface. Previously, whenever a setting was changed, the base station would have to be rebooted. With the 3.000, setting changes no longer created a reboot. An update program was offered for Japanese owners of the LF-PK1, however no update to firmware 3.000 has ever been made available for the North American model, nor can the Japanese 3.000 update be installed on the North American model.
- LF-B10
  - Bundled with LFA-PC20 LocationFree player for the PC and instructional DVD
  - Wired 10/100
  - Two Infrared Ports
- LF-B20
  - Bundled with LFA-PC20 LocationFree player for the PC and instructional DVD
  - Wireless 11a/b/g. Can also be used as a conventional Wi-fi access point if connected to a wired router via Ethernet.
  - Two Infrared Ports
- LF-V30
  - Bundled with LFA-PC30 LocationFree player for the PC and instructional DVD
  - Wireless 11a/b/g. Can also be used as a conventional Wi-fi access point if connected to a wired router via Ethernet.
  - Component Support
  - Possibly known as LF-W1HD in Japan

Notes: - Wired models can be used via normal wireless routers. Access via internet via firewall provided necessary ports are opened. Can be used with DDNS.

Client box - enables users to watch streamed content on a television set, without the need for a PC or laptop.

- LF-Box 1

== LocationFree wireless tablet TV ==
In October 2004 Sony unveiled a portable, wireless and rechargeable SVGA 12.1" LCD tablet screen with dualband Wi-Fi technology (IEEE 802.11a/b/g) which can receive pictures from the LocationFree player up to 100 feet from the source signal. The TV also has web-browsing and email functions, a Memory Stick Duo slot and an on-screen hand-drawing function for use as a drawing tablet. The screen can also be used as an intelligent universal AV remote control. These tablets were bundled with Base Stations.

Three versions have been released:

- LF-X1
  - Original 12" Model, Aspect ratio 4:3 (LF-X1M is monitor only)
  - Besides included tablet, base station ONLY compatible with LFA-PC1 LocationFree player for the PC, sold separately. LFA-PC2 or later, as well as all other software players and the PSP are NOT compatible with this base station.
- LF-X5
  - 7" Model, Aspect ratio 16:9
  - Besides included tablet, base station ONLY compatible with LFA-PC1 LocationFree player for the PC, sold separately. LFA-PC2 or later, as well as all other software players and the PSP are NOT compatible with this base station.
- LF-X11
  - Bundled with same LF-B1 base station as LF-PK1. This means the base station also can be paired with other devices just like the LF-PK1 such as a PSP. However the LF-X11 tablet cannot be paired with another LF-B1 or other LocationFree base station, it is permanently bonded with the included LF-B1 base station.
  - Bundled with LFA-PC2 LocationFree player for the PC
  - Wireless 11a/b/g. Base station can also be used as a conventional Wi-fi access point if connected to a wired router via Ethernet.
  - Please read LF-PK1 description above for more information and details about the LF-B1 base station and its different firmware versions, as they are the same base station.

== Software ==
- LFA-PC1 LocationFree Player Software for Windows (Only compatible with LF-X1 and LF-X5 base stations. No other software is compatible with these base stations, including all later versions of LocationFree Player for Windows, and players for Macintosh and all other platforms)
- LFA-PC2 LocationFree Player Software for Windows (Only compatible with LF-PK1 and LF-X11)
- LFA-PC20 LocationFree Player Software for Windows (Compatible with LF-PK1, LF-X11, LF-B10 and LF-B20)
- LFA-PC30 LocationFree Player Software for Windows (Latest Windows Version & available as a one week trial. Compatible with all LocationFree base stations except LFA-PC1 specific base stations. Version 4.0.3.53 maintains Windows XP & Vista support. NOTE: This software is NOT YET AVAILABLE for UK LocationFree boxes - the software does region checks on the base station and refuses to install.)
- TLF-MAC/J is a retail software package for Mac OS X (Only compatible with Japanese base stations)
- TLF-MAC/E is a retail software package for Mac OS X (Only compatible with North American base stations)
- Miglia software package for Mac OS X (Only compatible with European base stations)
- NetFront LocationFree Player for Pocket PC (See link below)
- ThereTV free Android client for the LocationFree Protocol (See link below)

== See also ==
- Slingbox
- HDHomeRun
- Monsoon HAVA
- Dreambox
- DBox2
- Unibox
