= Xtreamer =

Xtreamer was a brand of home digital media player and HTPC (Home Theater PC) products. The product line's goal is to replace traditional video players in homes (such as DVD players) with more versatile, but still affordable, players. These players are capable of playing large collections of digital media - movies, music, and photos. The digital files can be streamed (fetched when needed) to the player from the local network (or the Internet), hence the name of the brand. The company has since shut down.

== Products ==
Xtreamer brand products are sold throughout the world by online sellers, and in some countries also in certain physical stores. However, the product is absent from most electronics stores - a move which the company claims helps reduce the products' prices.

Xtreamer Sidewinder, Xtreamer Pro, and Xtreamer DVD are three configurations of Xtreamer's original media player. All three can play media (movies, music and photos) from a local wired or wireless network, or from an attached USB device. The main difference between the three are in the physical dimensions of the device, and an additional internal storage option: The small and fan-less Sidewinder has room for one 2.5" internal hard disk; The bigger and fan-cooled Pro has room for two 3.5" hard disks, and the DVD has a DVD drive.

Xtreamer Sidewinder 2 and Xtreamer Prodigy are Xtreamer's second generation products. Both are fan-less (like the original Sidewinder); Both add built-in Wi-Fi, Gigabit Ethernet, USB 3, a general Web Browser and can connect to a USB keyboard or mouse making it easier to use this browser. The Sidewinder 2 has room for a 2.5" internal hard disk (up to 1 TB), while the Prodigy has room for a 3.5" disk, up to 3 TB. The Prodigy has two additional features: It supports 3D video, and it will be Xtreamer's first product to use Android in addition to Xtreamer's own user interface.

Xtreamer Ultra and "Xtreamer Ultra 2" are a settop computers based on Nvidia graphics and Intel Atom processors which comes pre-installed with OpenELEC and XBMC media center software for Home Theater PC pre-installed. The first-generation Xtreamer Ultra uses Nvidia Ion chipset with a 1.80 GHz Dual-Core Intel Atom D525 CPU, while the Xtreamer Ultra 2 uses discrete GeForce GT 520M graphics with a 2.13 GHz Dual-Core Intel Atom D2700 CPU.

Xtreamer Wonder and Xtreamer Prodigy4K released in 2015 are Android based media players with HEVC hardware decoding. The Prodigy4K also supports 3D Videos and UHDTV resolution.

eTRAYz is a NAS enclosure, i.e., a device that contains hard disks and serves their content on the local network, to be played by other streamers.

== Customer Support Concerns ==
Although Xtreamer offers a variety of products on its online store, many concerns about its poor customer support were expressed during the years. The company is known for its ignoring of customers who needed support after buying a product and deleting complaint messages from its forums or Facebook page. Many unhappy clients expressed their disappointment from the service of Xtreamer, both of its main site or local retailers.

== See also ==
- Digital Living Network Alliance
- XBMC Media Center
