= LIRC =

Free software

- Stable release: 0.10.2 / 4 October 2022; 2 years ago
- Repository: sourceforge.net/p/lirc/git/ci/master/tree/
- Written in: C
- Operating system: Linux
- Size: 653 kB (archived)
- Type: Infrared remote control
- License: GNU General Public License
- Website: https://lirc.org/

LIRC (Linux Infrared remote control) is an open source package that allows users to receive and send infrared signals with a Linux-based computer system.

There is a Microsoft Windows equivalent of LIRC called WinLIRC.

With LIRC and an IR receiver the user can control their computer with almost any infrared remote control (e.g. a TV remote control). The user may for instance control DVD or music playback with their remote control.

One GUI frontend is KDELirc, built on the KDE libraries.

== See also ==
- RC-5
