= Vu+ =

Series of Linux-powered DVB digital television receivers

The Vu+ (pronounced VuPlus), is a series of Linux-powered DVB satellite, terrestrial digital television receivers (set-top box), produced by Korean multimedia brand Ceru Co., Ltd.

== History and description ==
All older Vu+ hardware set-top boxes are MIPS-powered, newer are all ARM-powered and uses Enigma2 image based software as firmware.

Its firmware is officially user-upgradable, since it is a Linux-based computer, as opposed to third-party "patching" of alternate receivers. Firmware is based on Enigma 2, which was originally designed for Dreambox by Dream Multimedia. All units support Conax conditional access (CA) system, with software-emulated conditional-access modules (CAMs) available for many alternate CA systems. The built-in Ethernet interface allows networked computers to access the recordings on the internal hard disks and stream live picture from the tuners. It also enables the receiver to store digital copies of DVB MPEG transport streams on networked filesystems or broadcast the streams as IPTV to VideoLAN and XBMC Media Center clients. Unlike many PC based PVR systems that use free-to-air type of DVB receiver cards, the built-in conditional access allows receiving and storing encrypted content.

In the beginning of September in 2011, Dream Multimedia obtained a temporary injunction against the Satco Europe GmbH company for using their "Enigma 2" name in an advertising flyer to promote the Linux operating system installed on the Vu+ set-top-boxes, as "Enigma"(2) is a registered trademark name of Dream Multimedia GmbH.

== Models ==
Vu+ Duo front

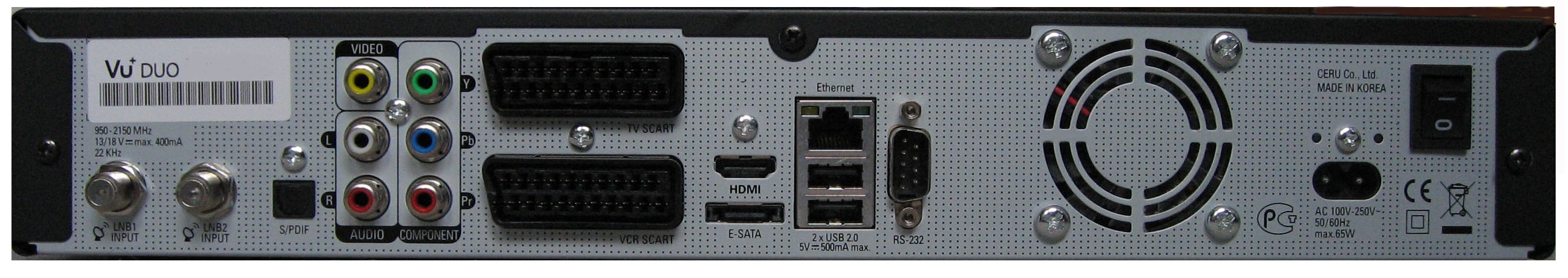
Vu+ Duo back

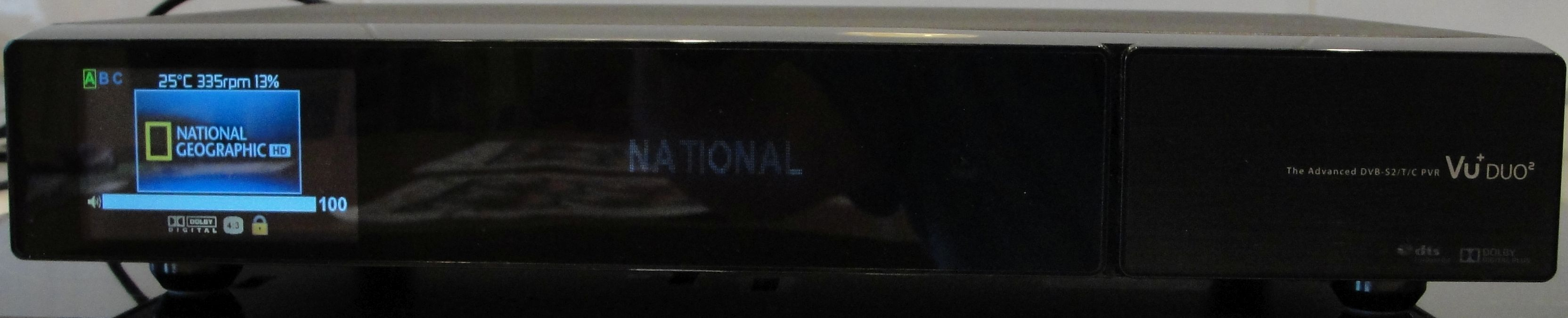
VU+ Duo2 front

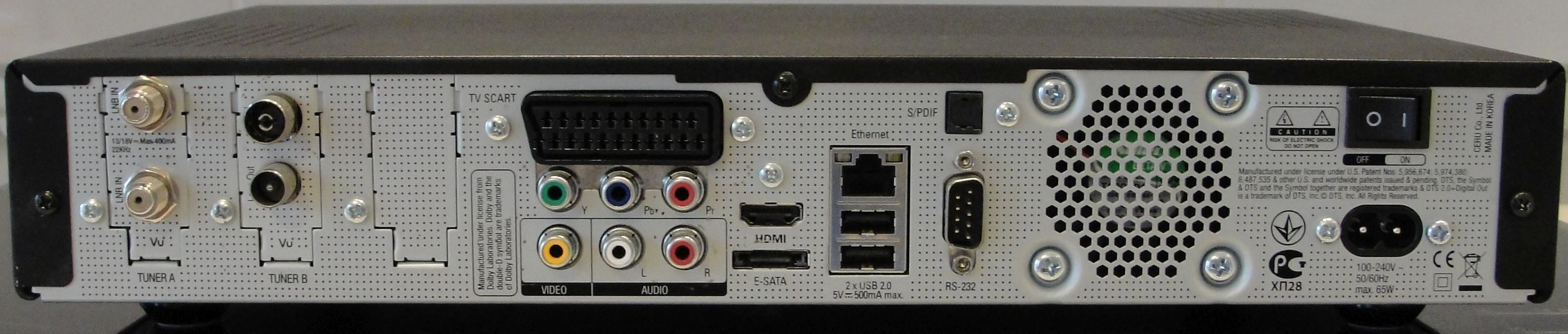
VU+ Duo2 back

Vu+	Ultimo	Ultimo 4K	Uno	Uno 4K	Uno 4K SE	Solo	Solo2	Solo SE	Solo SE V2	Solo 4K	Duo	Duo2	Duo 4K	Duo 4K SE	Zero	Zero 4K
Production	Discontinued	Discontinued	Discontinued	Discontinued	Available	Discontinued	Discontinued	Discontinued	Discontinued	Available	Discontinued	Discontinued	Discontinued	Available	Available	Available
Life cycle	2011 - 2013	2016 Dec.-	2011 - 2014	2016 Dec.-	2017-	2010 - 2013	2012-	2014-	2015-	2015-	2010 - 2013	2012-	2018-	2020-	2014-	2018-
SoC	BCM7413	BCM7444S	BCM7413	BCM7252S	BCM7252S	BCM7325	BCM7356	BCM7429	BCM7429	BCM7376	BCM7335	BCM7424	BCM7278	BCM7444S	BCM7362	BCM72604
CPU type	MIPS	ARM	MIPS	ARM	ARM	MIPS	MIPS	MIPS	MIPS	ARM	MIPS	MIPS	ARM	ARM	MIPS	ARM
CPU (MHz)	2x400	4x1500	2x400	2x1700	2×1700	333*	2x1300	2x1300	2x1300	2x1500	400	2x1300	4x2100	4x1500	742	2x1500
RAM (MiB)	512	3072	512	2048	2048	256	1024	1024	1024	2048	384	2048	2048	3072	512	2048
Flash (MiB)	1024	4096	128	4096	4096	128	256	256	512	4096	128	1024	4096	4096	256	4096
Flash type	NAND	eMMC	NAND	eMMC	eMMC	NAND	NAND	NAND	NAND	eMMC	NAND	NAND	eMMC	eMMC	NAND	eMMC
Default OS	Enigma2		Enigma2		Enigma2	Enigma2	Enigma2	Enigma2	Enigma2	Enigma2	Enigma2	Enigma2	Enigma2	Enigma2	Enigma2	Enigma2
DVB	3 ×P&P(S2/C/T)	2xP&P Dual FBC DVB-S2 or DVB-C + 1xP&P Dual DVB-S2 or Dual DVB-C/T2	1×P&P(S2/C/T)	1xP&P Dual FBC DVB-S2 or DVB-C	1 x Dual FBC DVB-S2X or FBC DVB-C or Dual T2 (Pluggable)	1×S2	2×S2	1xS2/C/T/T2	1xS2/C/T/T2	1×Fixed Dual S2 FBC + 1xP&P Dual DVB-S2 or Dual DVB-C/T/T2	2×S2	2×P&P(S2/C/T)	2xP&P slot: Dual FBC DVB-S2X, Dual DVB-T2, Dual FBC DVB-C	2xP&P slot: Dual FBC DVB-S2X, Dual DVB-T2, Dual FBC DVB-C	1×S2	1xFixed S2X or DVB-C/T/T2 tuner
HDTV	Yes	Yes	Yes	Yes	Yes	Yes	Yes	Yes	Yes	Yes	Yes	Yes	Yes	Yes	Yes	Yes
UHDTV	No	4K	No	4K	4K	No	No	No	No	4K	No	No	Yes	Yes	No	4K
3D TV	Yes		Yes	Yes	Yes	Yes	Yes	Yes	Yes	Yes	Yes	Yes	Yes		Yes	Yes
PiP	Yes	Yes/HD	Yes	Yes	Yes	No	Yes/HD	Yes	Yes	Yes	Yes	Yes/HD	Yes		No	No
Common Interface	2	2	2	1	1	2	1	1	1	1	2	2	2	2	0	1
Smart card	2	2	2	1	1	1	2	1	1	2	2	2	1	1	1	1
USB	3 x 2.0	2x3.0 + 1x2.0	3 x 2.0	2 x 3.0	2 x 3.0	2 x 2.0	3 x 2.0	2 x 2.0	2 x 2.0	2x3.0 + 1x2.0	3 x 2.0	3 x 2.0	2x3.0 (back) + 1x2.0 (front)	2x3.0 (back) + 1x2.0 (front)	2 x 2.0	1 x 2.0
RS-232	Yes	Yes	Yes	Yes	RJ11	Yes	Yes	Yes ***	Yes ***	Yes	Yes	Yes	Yes	Yes (RJ11)	Yes	Yes
LAN (Mbit/s)	100	1000 + WIFI N/AC 2.5/5 + BT 4.0	100	1000	1000	100	1000	100	100	1000	100	1000 + WIFI-N	1000 + WIFI N/AC 2.5/5 + BT 4.0	1000 + WIFI B/G/N/AC 2.5/5 + BT 4.0	100	100
HDD	2.5/3.5"	2.5/3.5"	2.5/3.5"	No	2.5" Detachable	No	2.5"	No	No	2.5" Detachable	3.5"	2.5/3.5"	2.5" Detachable	2.5" Detachable	No	No
ATA	SATA II		SATA II	No	No	No	SATA III	No	No	SATA III	SATA II	SATA III	SATA III		No	No
eSATA	Yes	No	Yes	No	-	No	No	Yes	Yes	No	Yes	Yes	No	No	No	No
SCART	1	No	1	No	No	1	1	No	No	No	2	1	No	No	No	No
HDMI	1.4	2.0 OUT/IN	1.4	2.0	1 x (2.0) IN 1 x (2.0) OUT	1.4	1.4	1.4	1.4	2.0	1.4	1.4	2.0 OUT/IN	1 x (2.0) IN 1 x (2.0) OUT	1.4	2.0
Display	graphical VFD	LCD (4.0")	VFD	Status LED	LCD (3.5" 240 x 400)	No	VFD	Status LED	Status LED	LCD (3.5")	VFD	LCD/VFD	LCD (3.5")	TFT (3.5"- MiniTV)	Status LED	Status LED
LNB pass-thru	Yes	No	Yes	No	No	No	No	Yes	Yes	No	No	No	No	No	No	No
Other connectors	1 x YPrPb				Digital Audio: S/PDIF	1 x YPrPb					1 x YPrPb	1 x YPrPb		Digital Audio: S/PDIF	Remote IR	Remote IR
Dimensions, WxHxD (mm)	380 x 60 x 290	380 x 70 x 278	340 x 60 x 272	230 x 41 x 170	280 x 50 x 222	280 x 50 x 200	280 x 50 x 200	211 x 45 x 185	211 x 45 x 185	315 x 65 x 255	380 x 60 x 280	380 x 60 x 290	310x60x241	310 x 68 x 255	160 x 30 x 145	140 x 50 x 115

- Note that Vu+ Uno and Vu+ Ultimo have a dual core processor BCM7413.
- * in most cases Solo is underclocked to 220.67MHz
- *** in Solo SE standard 9-pin D-sub connector is changed to 6-pin RJ11

=== Triple tuner ===
- Vu+ Ultimo (3 x pluggable DVB-S2 or DVB-T, T2/C tuners)
- Vu+ Ultimo 4K (2 x pluggable FBC DVB-S/S2 tuner or dual FBC DVB-C tuner and 1 x p&p DVB-S2 or DVB-T/C tuners)

=== Twin tuner ===
- Vu+ Duo 4K (2 x p&p slot for dual FBC DVB-S/S2X tuner, dual DVB-T2 tuner, dual FBC DVB-C tuner)
- Vu+ Solo 4K (2 fixed DVB-S/S2 tuner and 1 x pluggable DVB-S2 or DVB-T/C tuners)
- Vu+ Duo2 (2 x p&p DVB-S2 or DVB-T/C tuners)
- Vu+ Solo2 (2 x fixed DVB-S/S2 tuners)
- Vu+ Duo (2 x fixed DVB-S/S2 tuners)
- Vu+ Uno Twin (1 p&p DVB-S2 Twin tuner)

=== Single Tuner ===
- Vu+ Solo (1 fixed DVB-S/S2 tuner)
- Vu+ Solo SE (1 p&p DVB-S2 or DVB-T/C tuner)
- Vu+ Solo SE v2 (1 p&p DVB-S2 or DVB-T/C tuner)
- Vu+ Uno (1 p&p DVB-S2 or DVB-T/C tuner)
- Vu+ Uno 4k (1 p&p FBC DVB-S2 tuner or FBC DVB-C tuner)
- Vu+ Uno 4k SE (1 p&p Dusl FBC DVB-S2 or FBC DVB-C or Dual DVB-T2 Tuner)
- Vu+ Zero (1 fixed DVB-S/S2 tuner)
- Vu+ Zero SE (1 fixed DVB-S/S2 tuner)
- Vu+ Zero 4k (1 fixed Single DVB-S2X tuner or Single DVB C/T2 Tuner)

== XBMC4STB project by Vu+ ==
In September 2011, at "Vu+ Day", in Amsterdam, it was publicly announced that the generation of Vu+ DVB satellite receivers to be released publicly in the end of 2012 would be ARM-powered and use XBMC Media Center (now renamed to Kodi Entertainment System) software for its main GUI, an OpenEmbedded-based development-project that they call "XBMC4STB" (XBMC for Set-Top-Boxes), with beta releases of both the software and new hardware said to be made available to XBMC developers before they will be released to the public.

However it took two more years before a native source port of XBMC was available on the newer Vu+ (VuPlus) based set-top box models SoloSe, Solo2, and Duo2, all of which are MIPS instead ARM based. XBMC will not be made available for older Vu+ set-top boxes due to hardware limitations with missing OpenGL graphics acceleration.

=== Open Black Hole ===
"Open Black Hole" is an open source project for making unofficial third-party OpenPLi based images for newer Vu+ set-top boxes. Using the XBMC4STB software fork of Kodi/XBMC from Vu+, the images are designed as a hybrid integration between Kodi/XBMC media center software and Dreambox's Enigma2 PVR software scripts, forked from OpenPLi (based on OpenEmbedded Linux operating system for embedded systems), it is as such also fully compatible with PLi plugins and coding infrastructure. The project was first announced on 25 May 2015 and is maintained by the Black Hole Team, a team of independent developers of long popular community driven firmware images for Vu+-based set top-boxes, however these Open Black Hole project images are completely separate from the original Black Hole image for Vu+.

== See also ==
- Dreambox
- DBox2
- Enigma (DVB)
- Slingbox
- Kodi Entertainment System (formerly XBMC Media Center) software
- Video4Linux
- Smart TV
- Unibox
