= Unibox =

Digital TV receiver

Unibox is a satellite, cable and terrestrial digital receiver (set-top box). It has been distributed widely for use with Pay TV. It also enables the receiver to store digital copies of MPEG TS on internal harddisk or networked filesystems.

== Linux on the Uni-box ==
Unibox was based on the Linux operating system.

Originally Unibox was developed in Korea and sold in Europe, CIS, the Middle East and so on. Enthusiast groups in all over the world have developed localized software versions for the Unibox.

== Unibox models ==
There have been a number of different models of Unibox available. The numbers are suffixed with -S for Satellite, -T for Terrestrial and -C for Cable:

UD	Combo	1000HD	1100HD	2000HD
Product	Dis-continued	Available	Available	Will-be-available
Life Cycle	2011.May-	2011.Sep-	2011.Nov-	2011.Dec-
SoC	STi7105	STi7105	STi7110	STi7110
Size	290 x 200 x 58	180 x 145 x 38	180 x 145 x 38	180 x 145 x 38
CPU(MHz)	450	450	450	450
RAM(MB)	256	256	256	256
Flash(MB)	32	32	32	32
Flash type	NOR	NOR	NOR	NOR
Default OS	ST Linux	ST Linux	ST Linux	ST Linux
DVB	S2+T	S2/T/C	S2/T/C	S2 + S2/T/C
Common Interface	1	0	0	2
Smart card	2	1	1	2
USB	2 x 2.0	2 x 2.0	1 x 2.0	2 x 2.0
RS232	Yes	No	No	Yes
LAN(Mbit/s)	100	100	100	100
HDD	e-sata, USB	USB	USB	e-sata, USB
SCART	1	0	0	1
HDMI	1	1	1	1
Display	VFD	No	No	VFD
S/PDIF Optical	Yes	Yes	Yes	Yes
Component	Yes	No	No	Yes
Composite(RCA)	Yes	Yes	Yes	Yes

=== UD-Combo ===
This is essentially a full high definition(1080p) version of the UD Combo(S2+T) PVR, a 450 MHz MIPS processor, 32 MB of Flash memory, 256 MB of RAM. It also features one HDMI, two USB 2.0, one e-SATA and one 10/100 Mbit/s Ethernet interfaces. It has a VFD display.

=== UD-1000HD(180 x 145 x 40) ===
This is full high definition(1080p) USB PVR. It also features one HDMI, two USB 2.0, one 10/100 Mbit/s Ethernet interfaces. It has and touchpad on front.

=== UD-1100HD(180 x 145 x 40) ===
This is essentially a full high definition(1080p) version of the UD-1000HD(S2/T/C) USB PVR, a 450 MHz MIPS processor, 32 MB of Flash memory, 256 MB of RAM. It also features one HDMI, one USB 2.0, one 10/100 Mbit/s Ethernet interfaces. It has and touchpad on front.

The main differences of the UD-1100HD compared to the UD-1000HD are one USB port.

=== UD-2000HD(280 x 180 x 58) ===
This is full high definition(1080p) USB PVR. It supports one fixed tuner and one detachable tuner module (S2, T, C). It also features one HDMI, two USB 2.0, one eSATA, two Common Interface, two Smart card, one Optical and one 10/100 Mbit/s Ethernet interfaces.

=== Plug-ins ===
There are also many 3rd party plugins available. Plugins such as Weather forecast, YouTube, IRC chatting, WebCam, youporn, torrent are available.

In addition, unofficial third-party conditional access software modules (CAMs or emulators) are widely circulated on the Internet that emulate the CA systems developed by NDS (VideoGuard), Irdeto, Conax, Nagravision, Viaccess and other proprietary vendors. Some Uni-box owners use these softcams in conjunction with card sharing software to access pay TV services without a subscription card inserted in every connected box. This practice may be illegal in some jurisdictions and third-party software for this purpose is neither officially endorsed nor supported by UNIDIS and voids the official warranty.

== See also ==
- Dreambox
- Slingbox
- Vu+
- DBox2
- TV2Me - the original placeshifting device, developed by Ken Schaffer
- LocationFree Player
- HDHomeRun
- Monsoon HAVA
- Hauppauge MediaMVP - another connected device based on the IBM STB02500 chip
- Home theater PC
- Moxi
- Telly (home entertainment server)
