= Dreambox =

Linux-powered television receiver

Dreambox logo

Dreambox was a series of Linux-powered DVB satellite, terrestrial and cable digital television receivers (set-top boxes), produced by German multimedia vendor Dream Multimedia.

== History and description ==
The Linux-based production software originally used by Dreambox was originally developed for DBox2, by the Tuxbox project. The Dbox2 was a proprietary design distributed by KirchMedia for their pay TV services. The bankruptcy of KirchMedia flooded the market with unsold boxes available for Linux enthusiasts. The Dreambox shares the basic design of the DBox2, including the Ethernet port and the PowerPC processor.

Its firmware is officially user-upgradable, since it is a Linux-based computer, as opposed to third-party "patching" of alternate receivers. All units support Dream's own DreamCrypt conditional access (CA) system, with software-emulated CA Modules (CAMs) available for many alternate CA systems. The built-in Ethernet interface allows networked computers to access the recordings on the internal hard disks on some Dreambox models. It also enables the receiver to store digital copies of DVB MPEG transport streams on distributed file systems or broadcast the streams as IPTV to VideoLAN and XBMC Media Center clients. Unlike many PC based PVR systems that use free-to-air type of DVB receiver cards, the built-in conditional access allows receiving and storing encrypted content.

In 2007, Dream Multimedia also introduced a non-Linux based Dreambox receiver, the DM100, their sole to date, still featuring an Ethernet port. It has a USB-B port for service instead of the RS-232 or mini-USB connectors found on other models. Unlike all other Dreamboxes, it features an STMicroelectronics CPU instead of PowerPC or MIPS.

In 2023, Dream Property GmbH (formerly Dream Multimedia GmbH), the manufacturer of the Dreambox, entered liquidation.

== Dreambox models ==
There are a number of different models of Dreambox available. The numbers are suffixed with -S for Satellite, -T for Terrestrial and -C for Cable:

=== Table ===
DM	56x0	7000	7020	7025(+)	500(+)	100	600 PVR	800HD	820HD	8000	500HD	800HD se	7020HD	500HD v2	800HD se v2	7020HD v2	7080HD
Production	Discontinued	Discontinued	Discontinued	Discontinued	Discontinued	Discontinued	Discontinued	Discontinued	Available	Discontinued	Discontinued	Discontinued	Discontinued	Available	Available	Available	Available
Life cycle	2003-	2003-	2005-	2006-	2006-	2007-	2007-	2008-2012	2015-	2009-2012	2010-2013	2010-2013	2011-2013	2013-	2013-	2013-	2014-
SoC	STB04500	STB04500	STB04500	Xilleon 226	STB025xx	ST5100	STB025xx	BCM7401		BCM7400	BCM7405	BCM7405	BCM7405	BCM7405	BCM7405	BCM7405	BCM7435
CPU type	PPC	PPC	PPC	MIPS	PPC	ARM	PPC	MIPS	MIPS	MIPS	MIPS	MIPS	MIPS	MIPS	MIPS	MIPS	MIPS
CPU (MHz)	252	252	252	300	252	243	252	300		400	400	400	400	400	400	400	1400
RAM (MiB)	64	64	64	128	32 (96)	64	96	256	2048	256	256	256	512	512	512	512	2048
Flash (MiB)	8	8	32	32	8 (32)	32	32	64	4096	128	64	64	1024	1024	1024	1024	4096
Flash type	NOR	NOR	NAND	NAND	NOR (NAND)	NOR	NAND	NAND		NAND	NAND	NAND	NAND	NAND	NAND	NAND	eMMC
Default OS	Enigma1	Enigma1	Enigma1; Enigma2 (beta)	Enigma2	Enigma1	ST OS	Enigma1; Enigma2 (beta)	Enigma2		Enigma2	Enigma2	Enigma2	Enigma2	Enigma2	Enigma2	Enigma2	Dreambox OS
DVB	1 × S	1 × S	1 × S	2 × S/C/T	1 × S/C/T	1 × S	1 × S/C/T	S+S2/C/T	1 × S/C/T (modular)	2 × S+S2 (2 × S/C/T optional)	1 × S2	1 × S/C/T	1 × S2, 1 x C+T (in total 2x DVB-S/C/T optional)	1 × S2	1 × S/C/T	1 × S2, 1 x C+T (in total 2x DVB-S/C/T optional)	2 x S2 (2 * S/C/T optional)
HDTV	No	No	No	Yes	No	No	No	Yes	Yes	Yes	Yes	Yes	Yes	Yes	Yes	Yes	Yes
Common Interface	2	1	1	1	0	0	0	0	0	4	0	0	2	0	0	2	2
CompactFlash	0	1	1	1	0	0	0	0	MicroSD	Yes	0	0	0	0	0	0	0
Smart card	1	2	2	2	1	1	1	1	2	2	1	2	2	1	2	2	2
Host USB	No	1 x 1.1	1 x 1.1	1 x 1.1	No	No	No	2 x 2.0	2 x 2.0	3 x 2.0	No	2 x 2.0	3 x 2.0	No	2 x 2.0	3 x 2.0	2 x 3.0, 2 x 2.0
Service	No	RS-232	RS-232	RS-232	RS-232	USB-B	RS-232	RS-232	MiniUSB	RS-232	MiniUSB	MiniUSB	MiniUSB	MiniUSB	MiniUSB	MiniUSB	MiniUSB
LAN (Mbit/s)	100 (DM5620)	100	100	100	100	100	100	100	1000	100	100	100	100	100	100	100	1000
HDD	No	3.5 in	3.5 in	3.5 in	No	No	2.5 in	2.5 in, eSATA	2.5 in, eSATA	3.5 in and DVD	eSATA	2.5 in, eSATA	3.5 in + eSATA	eSATA	2.5 in, eSATA	3.5 in + eSATA	3.5 in + USB 3.0
ATA	No	parallel	parallel	parallel	No	No	parallel	serial	serial	serial	serial	serial	serial	serial	serial	serial	serial
RF mod.	Yes	No	Yes	Yes	No	No	No	No	No	No	No	No	No	No	No	No	No
SCART	2	2	2	2	1	1	1	1	0	2	1	1	1	1	1	1	0
HDMI / HDCP	0 / -	0 / -	0 / -	0 / -	0 / -	0 / -	0 / -	0 / -	1 / -	0 / -	1 / -	1 / -	1 / -	1 / -	1 / -	1 / -	1 x in, 1 x out / -
DVI	0	0	0	0	0	0	0	1**	0	1**	0	0	0	0	0	0	0
Display	LCD	LCD	LCD	OLED	No	No	No	OLED	OLED	OLED	No	multi-colour OLED	OLED	No	multi-colour OLED	OLED	OLED
LNB pass-thru	Yes	Yes	Yes	Yes	Yes	Yes	Yes	Yes	No	No	No	No	No	No	No	No	No
S/PDIF Optical	Yes	No	No	Yes	No	No	Yes	Yes	Yes	Yes +RCA	Yes	Yes	Yes	Yes	Yes	Yes	Yes
Modem	No	No	No	No	No	No	Yes	Yes	No	Yes	Yes	Yes	Yes	Yes	Yes	Yes	No
Other connectors						S-Video	S-Video		HDMI-In	Component, S-Video							

- **HDMI via DVI to HDMI adapter.
- Remark: The new 7020hd v2 has a new Flash with another structure, that is why you need a different Linux Image. All new v2 Modells have a new TPM module inside. The rest of the Hardware is identical with the older one.

=== DM 7000 ===
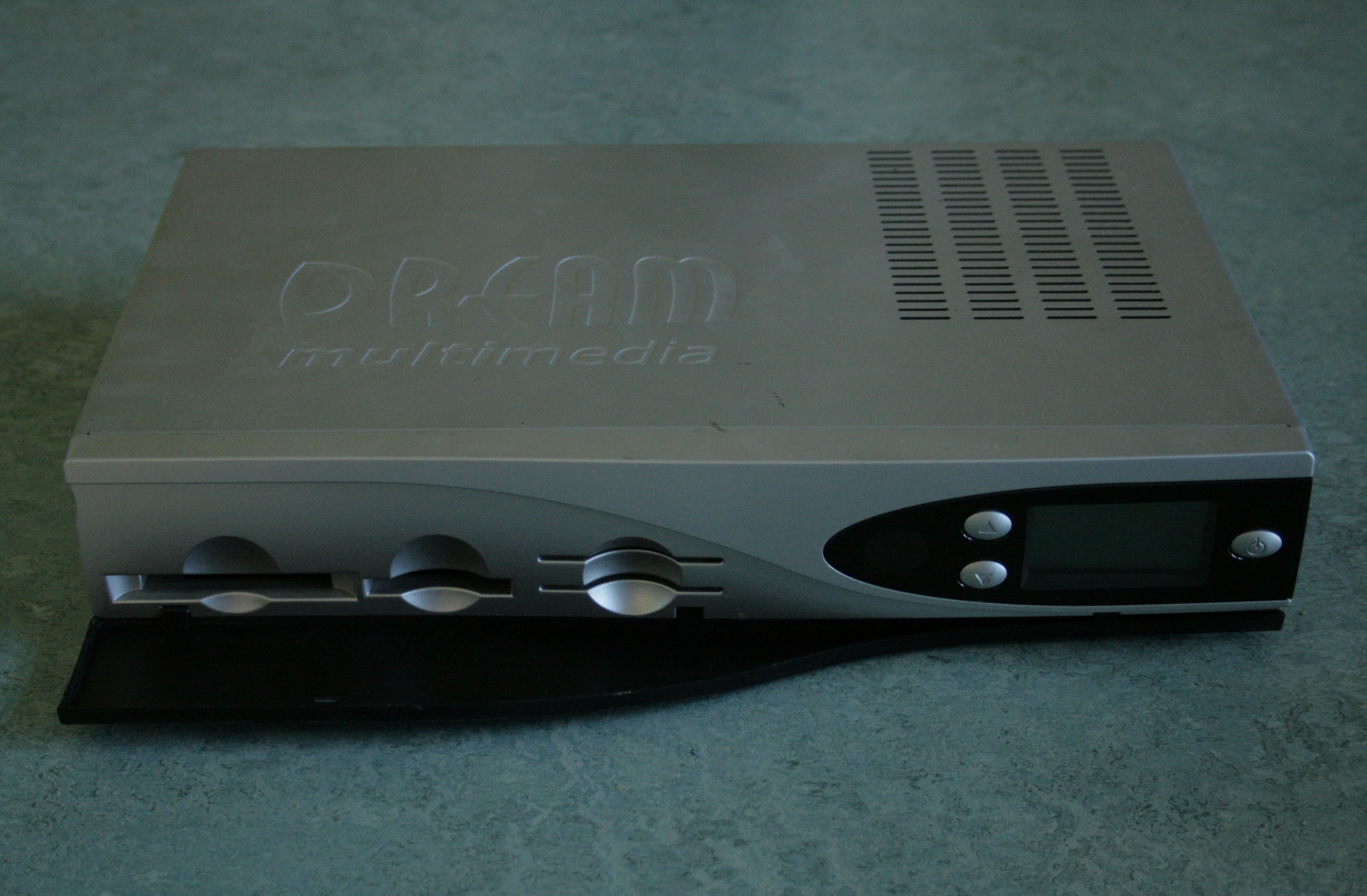
DM 7000-S

The DM 7000 is based around the IBM STB04500 controller, featuring a PowerPC processor subsystem and hardware MPEG decoding, has 64 MiB of RAM, 8 MiB of NOR flash memory (directly executable), a Common Interface slot, a dual smart card reader, a CompactFlash card reader, a USB 1.1 port, and an IDE (also known as PATA) interface for attaching an internal 3.5 in hard disk drive to convert the unit into a digital video recorder. Accepts only 230 V AC power.

Because the boot loader resides in flash memory, this model may require the use of a JTAG in case of bad flashing which destroyed the boot loader. However, a bad flash will occur under rare scenarios, and rarely, almost never, will you need a JTAG.

=== DM 5600, DM 5620 ===
There was a DM 5600 and also a DM 5620 model. The only difference being that the DM 5620 included an Ethernet port. Otherwise, the DM 56X0 models were a cut down version of the DM 7000 without an IDE interface. They did, however, include an RF modulator allowing them to be used with older TVs that lack a SCART connector.

=== DM 500, DM 500+, DM500HD ===
The DM500 is the successor to the DM5620 and is the smallest and cheapest Dreambox. It is based around an IBM STBx25xx Digital Set-Top Box Integrated Controller, featuring notably a 252 MHz PowerPC processor subsystem, hardware MPEG-2 video and audio decoding and smart card interfaces. The DM500 features 32 MB of RAM and 8 MB of NOR flash memory, of which 5 MB are used for read-only firmware (cramfs and squashfs filesystems), 256 kB by the boot loader and the rest by a writable jffs2 filesystem.

It has the standard features of a free-to-air (FTA) satellite receiver, plus extensive Fast Ethernet networking connectivity and a single smart card reader. It does not feature a 7-segment LED display, normally found in other FTA decoders.

Also has the ability to be used on Digital satellite, cable and terrestrial broadcasts (also known as DVB-S, DVB-C, DVB-T).

The DM500+ model has 96 MB of RAM instead of 32, and 32 MB of NAND flash instead of 8 MB of NOR flash. This makes it similar to the DM600 PVR model. It is only available in DVB-S versions.

The new DM500HD was announced in Cologne on May 26, 2009. The price will be between € 350 and € 400.

=== DM 7020 ===
The DM 7020 is essentially an updated DM 7000 with 96 MiB of RAM, 32 MiB of NAND flash (disk-like) and an RF modulator. Changes were also made on the software side, utilizing Open Embedded for the base Linux operating system.

Because the flash memory of this model is not directly executable, the primary boot loader resides in ROM and can recover corrupted secondary boot loader in flash by loading from the serial port.

There are some Enigma 2 (beta) images already available for this model.

=== DM 7025, DM 7025+ ===
The DM 7025 is similar to the DM7020 but with the ability to add a second "snap-in" tuner that makes it possible to watch one program while recording another. It is possible to change the tuner module, selecting between any two of Satellite, Terrestrial or Cable versions.

Internally, it features a Xilleon 226 system-on-a-chip from ATI, integrating a 300 MHz MIPS CPU core instead of the traditional PowerPC found in other models, and has 128 MiB of RAM. It uses Enigma 2, this is a complete rewrite of the original Enigma GUI, and is still going through growing pains as features that were present in Enigma are added to Enigma2. Enigma2 is Python-based instead of C code.

The DM 7025 has the ability to decode MPEG-2 HD as well. Unfortunately, it must downconvert this to 480i or 576i to display it. The DM 7025+ model features an Organic light-emitting diode (OLED) display instead of an LCD one, an eject button on the Common Interface slot and improved power supply.

=== DM 600 PVR ===
The DM 600 PVR is the same small size as the DM 500 but includes an IDE interface allowing to add an internal 2.5 in laptop-type hard disk drive, the box will only recognise 5600rpm drives. On the outside it adds an S-Video output connector and an analog modem port. It is built around the same IBM STBx25xx integrated controller, but features 32 MiB of flash and 96 MiB of RAM, of which 64 MiB are user-accessible. It is possible to change the tuner module, selecting between Satellite, Terrestrial and Cable versions. There is still just one SCART connector and no 7-segment LED display, just 2 status LEDs. The provided remote control unit is the same one supplied with the 7000, 7020 and 7025 and allows one to control the TV set as well.

=== DM 800HD PVR / DM 800 HD se ===
This is essentially a high definition version of the DM 600 PVR, featuring a single pluggable DVB tuner (S/S2, C or T), a 300 MHz MIPS processor, 64 MiB of Flash memory, 256 MiB of RAM and room for an internal SATA 2.5 in disk. It also features one DVI to HDMi Cable, two USB 2.0, one eSATA and one 10/100 Mbit/s Ethernet interfaces. It has an OLED display.

DM 800HD se was introduced in late 2010. The main differences of the DM800HD se compared to the DM 800HD are a 400 MHz MIPS processor, a HDMI connector and a color OLED display. Another difference is the improved system chip in DM800se providing native DIVX support among other improvements.

=== DM 8000 HD PVR ===
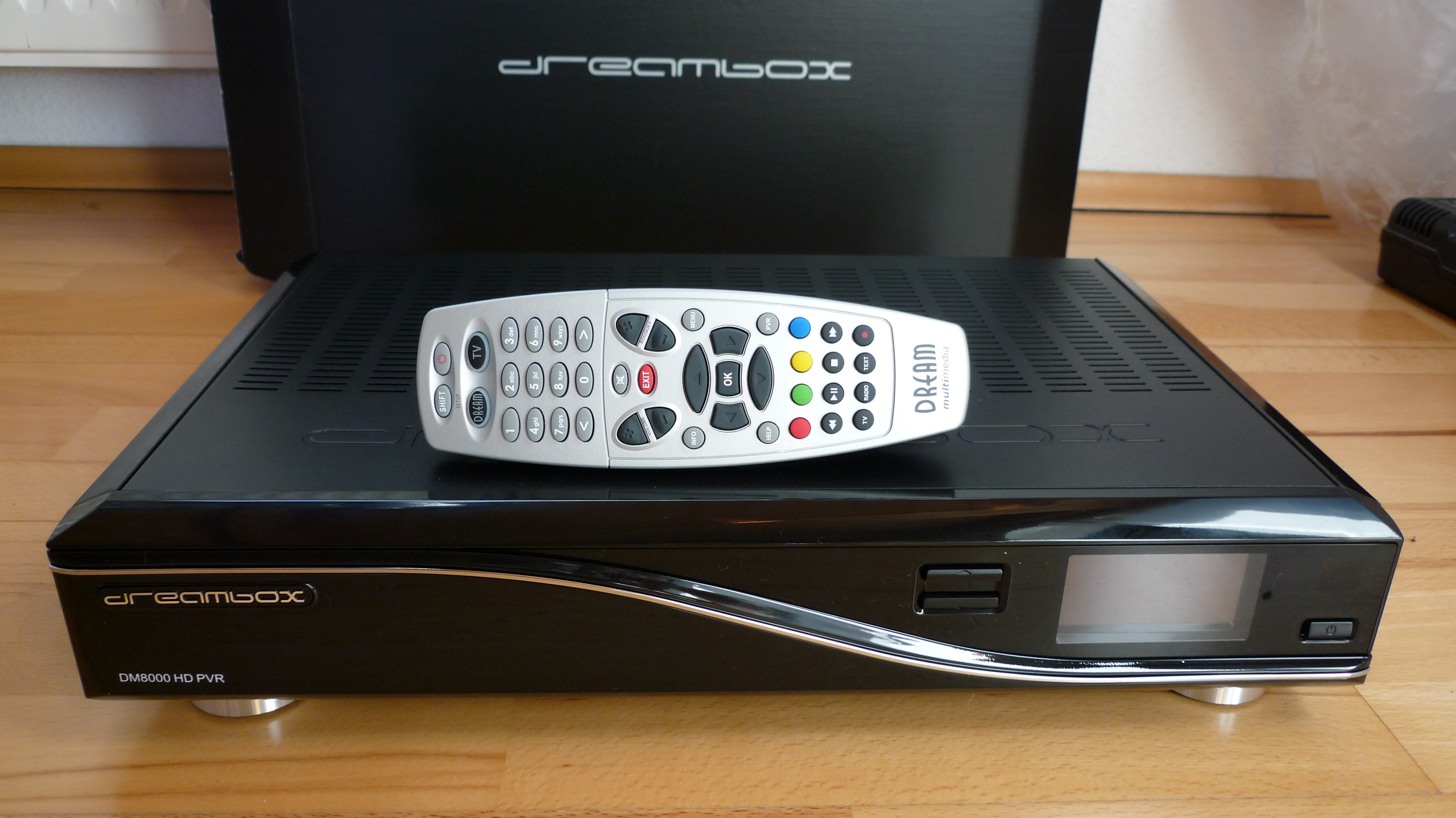
DM 8000 HD PVR

This is the high definition PVR. Like the DM-7025, it supports pluggable tuner modules. In addition to High Definition, it has an upgrade for a DVD drive (slot in). And it has USB 2.0. Physically on the box it has one DVI-port, but with the supplied DVI to HDMi Cable you get HDMI video.

Originally announced to become available in the beginning of 2007, its release date was pushed back. The product then began shipping on 12.12.2008. The planned features were revised as well. Originally, this model was supposed to have 128 MiB of RAM (now 256), 32 MiB of flash (now 256 MiB) and a 300 MHz processor (now 400 MHz Broadcom 7400). Other Linux-based HD receivers became available in the meantime.

In June 2012, Dream Multimedia announced the discontinuation of the DM 8000 HD PVR because several electronic components are no longer available. It was also announced, that no direct successor will be developed since Dream Multimedia is already working at "Project Goliath".

=== "Project Goliath" ===
"Project Goliath", announced in June 2012, is supposed to be a possible successor of several Dreambox models. According to Dream Multimedia, it is a "totally new hardware and software product, combining all the features of the successful Dreambox series, and indeed will go beyond that".

=== DM 900 ultraHD ===
- Dreambox OS
- Dreambox API
- CPU: Dualcore 12K DMIPS
- 2 × HDMI (Input 1.4a and Output 2.0)
- Plug&Play tuner slots
- 3" color LC display
- Touch on/off
- MPEG-2/H.264 decoder (Full HD)
- H.265 decoder (Ultra HD)
- Smartcard reader
- SD card reader
- Common Interface slot (CI)
- DVB-S2 or DVB-C/T2 tuner
- 2 GB RAM
- 4 GB Flash (eMMC)
- Gigabit Ethernet interface
- 2 × USB 3.0
- Mini USB service port (Flash rescue)
- S/PDIF digital bitstream out
- Automatic service scan
- 2.5″ HDD slot for optional internal SATA hard drive
- WiFi support (optional)
- Web interface for PC and smartphone
- DiSeqC 1.0, 1.1, 1.2, USALS, Unicable
- FBC technology
- Dimensions: 270 × 187 × 60 mm (W × D × H)

=== DM 920 ultraHD ===
- Dreambox OS
- Dreambox API
- CPU: Dualcore 12K DMIPS
- 2 × HDMI 2.0 (input and output)
- 2 × Plug&Play tuner slots
- 3″ color LC display
- Touch on/off
- MPEG-2/H.264 decoder (Full HD)
- H.265 decoder (Ultra HD)
- Smartcard reader
- SD card reader
- 2 × Common Interface slot (CI)
- FPGA technology
- 2 GB RAM
- 8 GB Flash (eMMC)
- Gigabit Ethernet interface
- 2 × USB 3.0
- Mini USB service port (Flash rescue)
- S/PDIF digital bitstream out
- Automatic service scan
- 2.5″ HDD slot for optional internal SATA hard drive
- WiFi support (optional)
- Web interface for PC and smartphone
- DiSeqC 1.0, 1.1, 1.2, USALS, Unicable
- Multistream support
- FBC technology
- Dimensions: 270 × 187 × 60 mm (W × D × H)

=== Dreambox One ===
After multiple postponements, an approximate release date for the Dreambox One (satellite variant) was announced as part of a preliminary test at the end of March 2019. A combo variant with one DVB-S2X and one DVB-C/T2 tuner was scheduled to appear in April 2019, and a pure Android streaming box without tuner in summer 2019 (“Dreambox Play”).

- Operating system: Linux E2 & Android 8.1 (dual boot)
- CPU: Quad-core processor A73 plus dual A53
- GPU: ARM Mali-G52, 850 MHz
- 16 GB flash
- 2 GB RAM
- Tuner: 1× DVB-S2X (satellite variant), 1× DVB-S2X and 1× DVB-C/T2 (combo variant)
- 53,360 DMIPS
- Dual-boot capability
- Extensible via Android apps
- 7-day (multi) EPG
- H.264/H.265 hardware encoding (1080p60)
- Unlimited memory slots & favorites lists
- 32 languages
- HDTV formats: 2160p, 1080i/p, 576p, 480i/p
- DiSEqC and Unicable support: 1.0, 1.1, 1.2 and USALS
- Multistream-capable
- Recordings via EPG & timer
- 1× Dual Band WLAN interface (802.11 a/b/c/g/ac 2 × 2 MIMO)
- 1× HDMI 2.0 output (rear)
- 1× S/PDIF optical (rear)
- 1× USB 3.0 (rear)
- 1× USB 2.0 (rear)
- 1× Gigabit LAN (rear)
- 1× service port (rear)
- 1× 12V power connection (rear)
- 1× SD card reader (front)
- 1× smartcard reader (front)
- Dimensions: 172 × 34 x93 millimeters
- Weight: 306 grams

== Alternative firmware and plug-ins ==
The factory-installed distribution on the Dreambox is mostly available under the GNU General Public License (GPL) and uses standard Linux API's, including Linux DVB API and Linux Infrared Remote Control (LIRC). Several models (7025, 800 and 8000) use GStreamer as a multimedia framework. This configuration encourages enthusiasts to modify its functions, particularly in the form of so-called images.

=== Plug-ins ===
There are also many third party addons and plugins available that will extend the functionality of the Dreambox. Some plugins are model specific, while others run on all boxes. Plugins such as Jukebox and SHOUTcast playback, also external XMLTV guides, a web browser are available, and a VLC media player interface for on demand streaming media. Games are also abundant like Pac-Man and Tetris.

In addition, unofficial third-party conditional access software modules (CAMs or emulators) are widely circulated on the Internet that emulate the CA systems developed by NDS (VideoGuard), Irdeto, Conax, Nagravision, Viaccess and other proprietary vendors. Some Dreambox owners use these softcams in conjunction with card sharing software to access pay TV services without a subscription card inserted in every connected box. This practice may be illegal in some jurisdictions and third-party software for this purpose is neither officially endorsed nor supported by Dream Multimedia and voids the official warranty.

== Clones ==
Clones of the DM500-S are wide spread. As a result, Dream Multimedia introduced the DM500+, with changes to try to prevent further counterfeiting.

Clones also exist of DM500, DM800, DM800se and DM800se V2 built around the same commodity IBM SoC chip and hence having identical or slightly superior features they are also sold without the Dreambox brand name (e.g., the Envision 500S, with 48 megabytes of RAM instead of 32, also available in a 500C cable version, the Eagle box or the Linbox 5558, or Sunray DM800se). They have a retail price approaching that of non-Linux receivers, generally a fraction of the Dreambox 500 price. Since they contain a copy of the copyrighted original DM500 bootloader program, the legality of these devices is questionable.

In April 2008, Dream Multimedia allegedly introduced a time bomb into their latest flash to disable the boot loader on counterfeit models. An unofficial firmware group called Gemini who used the latest flash drivers in their firmware, found that flash corruption would be caused on clone DM500-S receivers. Other developers of unofficial firmware groups would find boxes to be affected by this if they use the latest drivers, providing another time bomb is to be introduced.

== See also ==
- DBox2
- Slingbox
- Vu+
- Hauppauge MediaMVP - another connected device based on the IBM STB02500 chip
- Unibox
