= DBox2 =

Digital television integrated receiver decoder

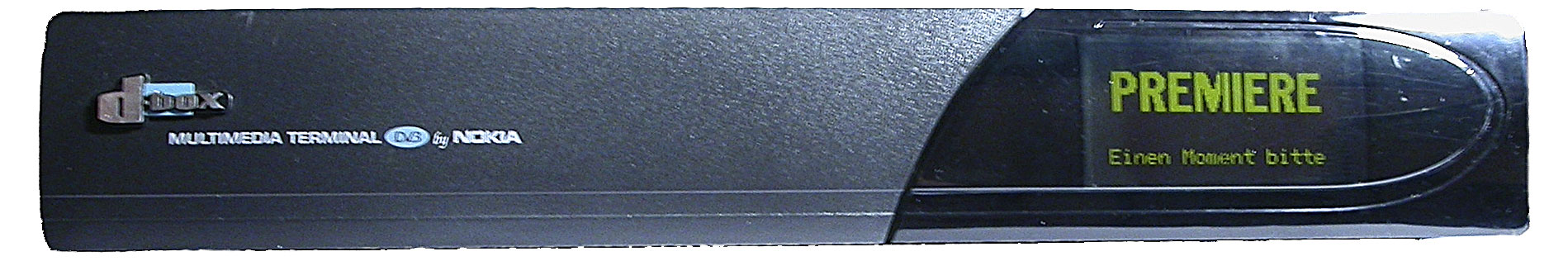
A DBox2

The DBox is a DVB satellite and cable digital television integrated receiver decoder (set-top box). It were distributed widely for use with Pay television channels. It was commissioned by the Kirch group's DF1, an early German provider of digital television that later merged with Premiere. The hardware was developed and produced by Nokia though later also produced by Philips and Sagem under license.

The combination of third-party developers and network connectivity which facilitates card sharing, makes DBox2 (and the DBox2 based Dreambox) use particularly common among enthusiasts and those who intend to obtain services without payment. It also enables the receiver to store digital copies of DVB MPEG transport streams on networked filesystems or broadcast the streams as IPTV to VideoLAN and XBMC Media Center clients.

In 2001, following the bankruptcy of Kirch Media, production of the D-box ceased. However, many devices continue to be traded second-hand (often using online auction sites) and fairly high prices are paid because of the ability to gain services without payment. For this reason, there are also a significant number of, mostly German language, web sites and forums devoted to the devices.

When the device was in production, both free and pay TV were limited to the SD resolution (e.g., PAL and NTSC), thus it is not possible to receive today's programs in HD with any of the D-Boxes or to modify them accordingly.

== Linux on the Dbox-2 ==
Since 1997 an alternative operating system has been available for the predecessor of the Dbox2, the Dbox. This was DVB98 (later DVB2000), developed by a single programmer. Despite programming the hardware directly using machine code, DVB2000 is superior in many respects relative to the original software.

For the DBox2, an effort was created to port the Linux operating system. This is now the most popular choice. Installation involves first putting the box into its debug-mode, a mode intended for internal development. It is then possible to take a backup copy of the original operating system (including vital micro-code images for the MPEG decoder chipset) and flash an image based on Linux to the device.

In addition to the Linux kernel and drivers, a significant amount of code is needed to allow the DBox2 to function as a digital receiver. This code is all maintained under a single open-source project - TuxBox. There is, however, a choice of user-interfaces that can be used, the most popular being Neutrino and Enigma. Enigma is also used on the Dreambox.

=== Hardware upgrades ===
The DBox2 does not have a hard disk drive or other internal storage. Modules have however become available for attaching IDE hard drives and SATA hard drives and MMC and SD flash memory cards. Support for these is included in some software distributions.

== See also ==
- HDHomeRun
- Monsoon HAVA
- Slingbox
- LocationFree Player
- Unibox
- Eurovox
