= RVU =

RVU may refer to:

- Rocky Vista University College of Osteopathic Medicine
- RVU Alliance
- RVU protocol
- Relative Value Units in healthcare management systems, specifically Medicare
- Radio Volks Universiteit, a former educational broadcaster in The Netherlands, now merged into Omroep NTR
- Rift Valley University College
