= Bell Video Store =

Premium Internet VOD service offered by Bell Sympatico

Bell Video Store (formerly VideoPlay.ca) was the premium Internet video-on-demand service offered by Bell Sympatico. It had a French language equivalent, LaBanqueVideo/Boutique video Bell. It started in Beta mode on 4 May 2007 and launched in Canada in 2008. It offered movies, television shows, and music videos/concerts for $1.99 and up.

It forged agreements with Paramount Pictures and various digital production companies to provide the latest TV shows and movie releases for legal purchase or rental. A purchase included a full-resolution video file with the rights to download on up to 4 devices.

For display on a computer or transfer to a portable device, the service required the installation of a client application (Media Player) which managed playback and the transfer of video to devices.

It ceased operations on 15 July 2009. Movies were not available for purchase or rent after 15 June 2009.

== Compatibility ==
The Video Store player was compatible with the Windows XP family of operating systems and Windows Vista. The content could be viewed using the Bell Video Player, Windows Media Player, a Media Centre compatible computer, and a PlaysForSure portable device (May 2008). With the Media Centre capability, content could then be streamed to a television using a Windows Media Center Extender such as an Xbox 360 console from a PC running Windows XP Media Center Edition or Windows Vista (Home Premium or Ultimate). Downloaded videos could be burned to a DVD for storage purposes, but the resulting DVD would not play on a DVD player.

== Social networking ==
The Video Store had a social networking component and partnered with Broadband Mechanics to deliver a series of "widgets" that allowed users to interact with content on the site. Examples of this included 5-star ratings, reviews, comments, adding friends, sending messages, and more.

== Video quality ==
The content delivered by Bell Video Store was "DVD and above quality". Bit rates ranged from 1.5 to 2.5. The encoding rate used created a file size which made one hour of programming roughly equal to one gigabyte (1 GB) of file space in a computer. In comparison, a typical DVD makes a 2-hour movie about 4.7 GB.

Due to the large size of the files being downloaded, the service required a broadband internet connection capable of sustaining transfer speeds of 800 kbit/s. A 2-hour film might have taken 7 hours and 20 minutes to download using a 750 kbit/s DSL/cable connection or 1 hour and 50 minutes with a 3.0 Mbit/s DSL/cable connection.

For Bell Video Store users with a high speed connection, the service delivered a progressive download feature which aimed to have any Bell Video Store files playing within 5 minutes.
