= Media center application =

Multimedia application designed for large screens

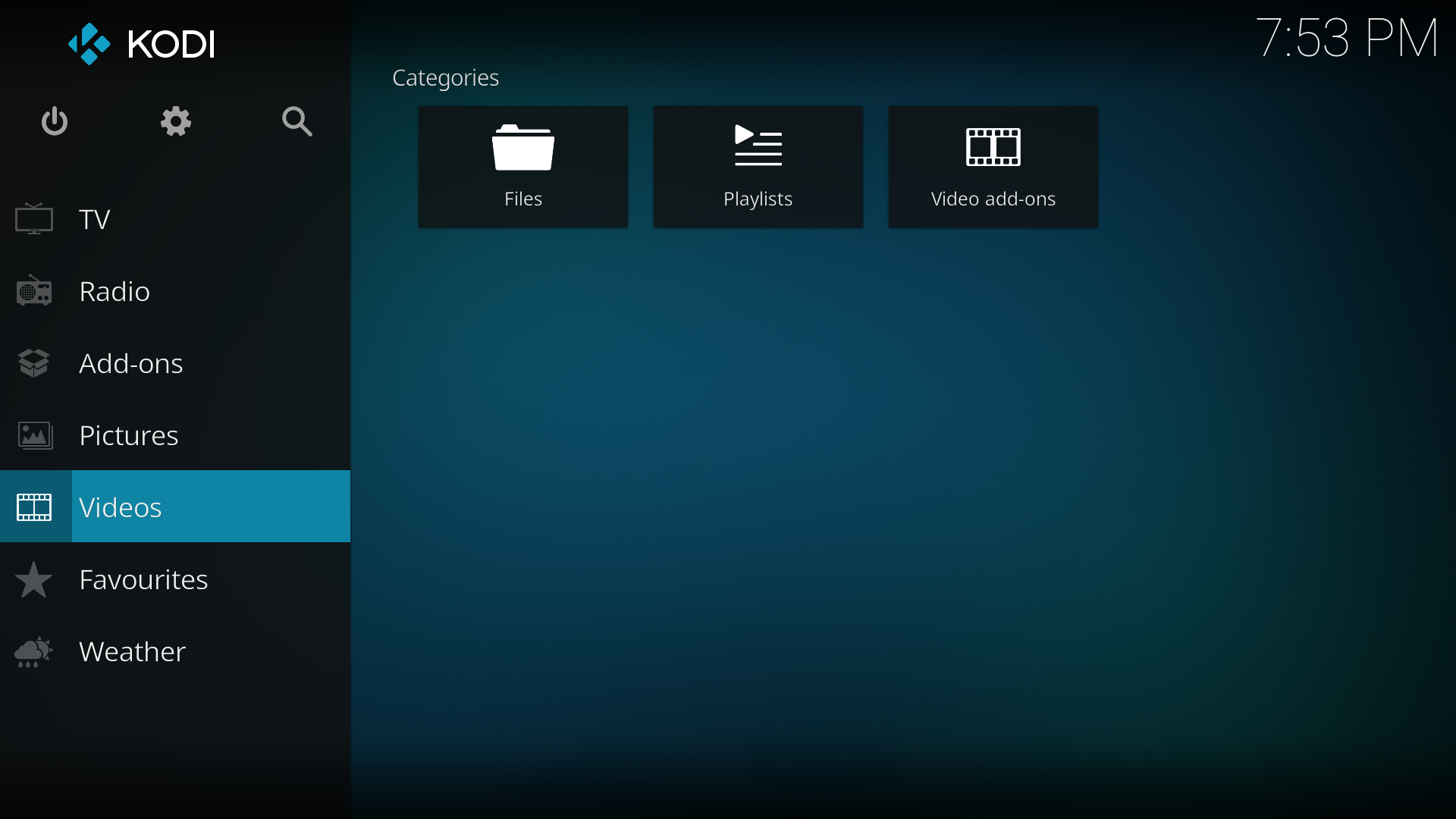
Kodi is a free and open-source media center application and combines media playback, library organization, live TV, media streaming enabled by add-ons, and more, all in a 10-foot interface designed to be displayed on a large screen and controlled by a remote.

A media center application, or simply media center, is a type of multimedia and technological convergence software that is designed to be used on a large screen like a television or a projector. They are intended to be controlled by wireless devices such as a remote, game controllers, or a smartphone connected via Wi-Fi.

They usually inherit the combined capabilities of media playback, digital media library organization and aggregation, connection to a media server, music and video playlist creation, music visualizations, live TV playback, media streaming, among others. They then present the content on a 10-foot interface that is easy to view from a couch or seat, and can have multiple views for browsing media.

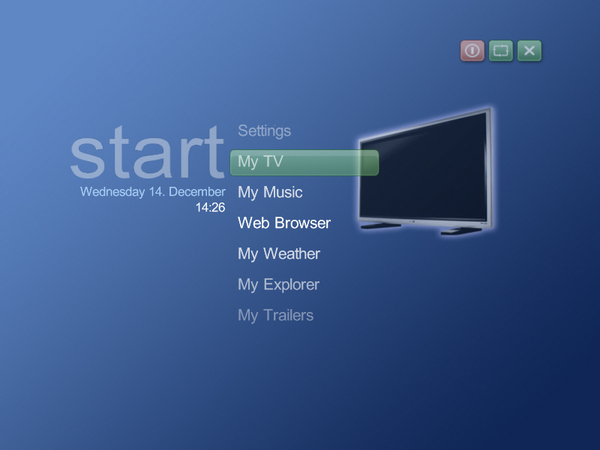
MediaPortal, a Windows exclusive application with an XP Windows Media Center-esque skin shown.

Media center applications started appearing during the early 2000s as large screens and DVD players were becoming mainstream, and they provide a solution for personal computers to be used as a front-end interface for large screens. They are the main software application of home theater PCs and can also be seen on regular computers, mini PCs, or digital media players.

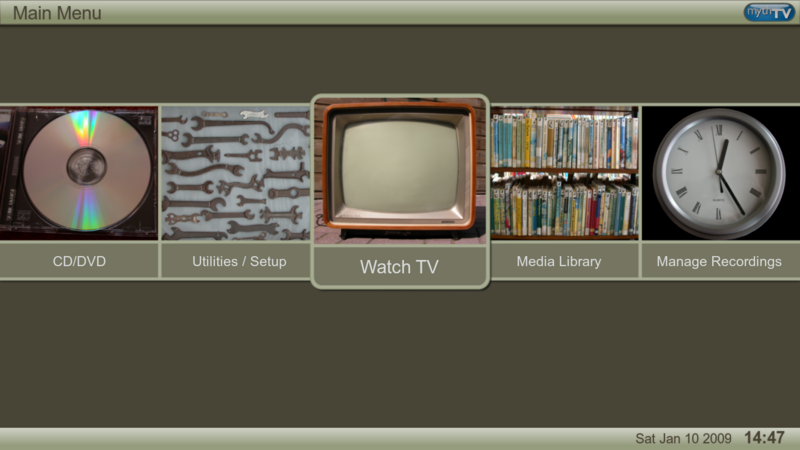
MythTV, usually used as a live TV backend, is also a media center application in its own right.

One of the first media center applications to be created is Kodi. Originally created in 2002 as a homebrew mod for the original Xbox, it has expanded to many platforms such as Windows, Android, Fire TV, and more. MythTV was released in the same year as Kodi and while mainly used as a live TV backend, it is also a standalone media center application. Once popular among some Windows users, Windows Media Center is included with Windows XP MCE, Windows Vista, and Windows 7 before its discontinuation. MediaPortal, released in 2004, is a Windows exclusive application often considered as a modern alternative to WMC. Other applications include the Plex App, JRiver Media Center's theater mode, NextPVR Player, and SageTV. Discontinued applications include Apple's Front Row, GB-PVR, Beyond TV, and Boxee.

Nowadays, features these applications usually have are incorporated into game consoles, digital media players, and some smart TVs combining local content with streaming content. Digital media players include the NVIDIA Shield, Amazon Fire TV, Roku, and Apple TV. They have largely replaced media center applications for most people, though some users still use these applications for added flexibility or use cases such as enhanced live TV or local library functionality.

== Overview ==
Media center applications are multimedia applications for digital media and combines many media functions, such as live TV playback and media browsing, and are designed to be displayed on a large screen through a 10-foot user interface. They allow users to list and search media, play media, and control the application using a remote.

The applications are usually run on computers or digital media players and provide for one's media preferences. They are the main software application of home theater PCs other than operating systems such as Microsoft Windows and are defined by their dedicated use for large screen televisions or projectors, and their combination with the application.

=== Interface ===
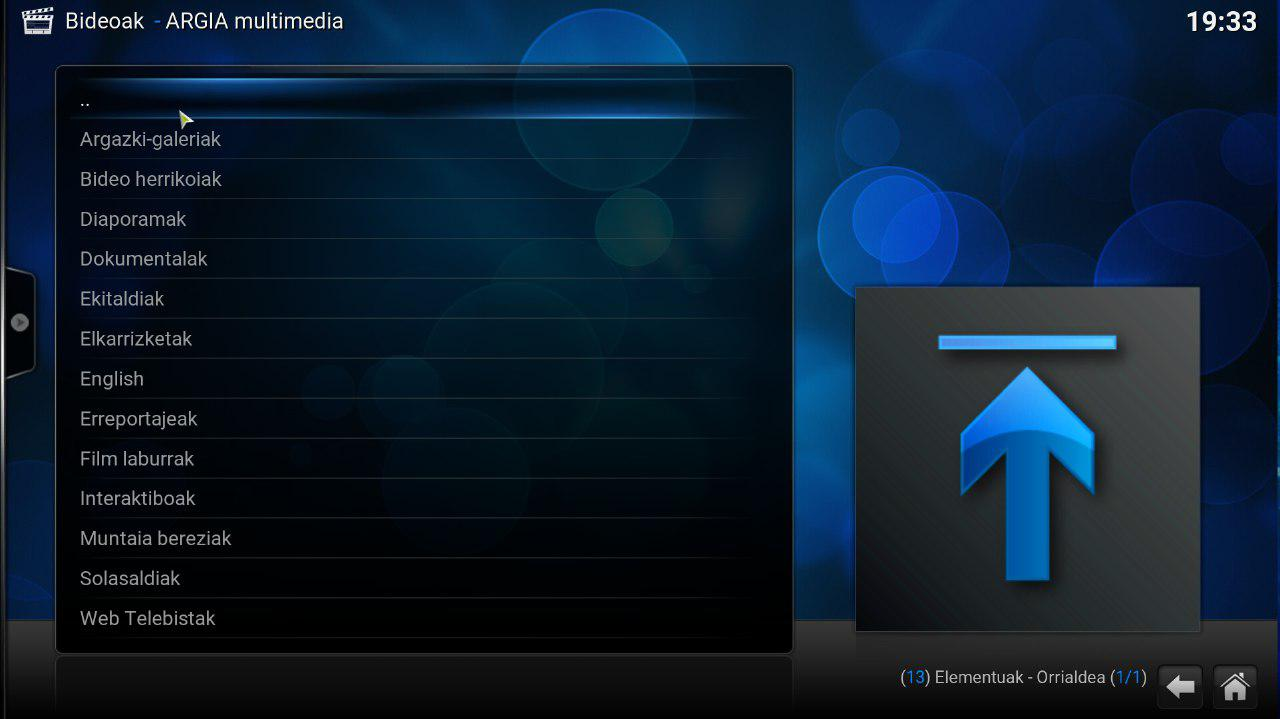
Browsing through the Argia magazine in list view, through an add-on in Kodi with the Basque language.

The interface of media center applications is a 10-foot user interface designed for large screens, where the content and text are large and the interface is fullscreen, and is designed for easy viewing from a distance, such as a couch or a seat. In some applications such as Kodi or MythTV, the user interface is fully customizable and can install new themes or sound effects which let users customize their experience.

They usually start with a home screen with buttons to the types of media and services, and can contain widgets that show information locally or from the internet such as what's new and trending or continue watching. Home screens can be customized on some applications to fit one's preferences and interests.

Media center applications usually present the content in unique views such as thumbnail, list, film banner, or more while browsing content locally or online. The content can also be sorted by rules such as name, date created, genre, and more. The interface can also include a search box within the folder, or globally for searching content.

=== Media libraries ===
Most media center applications allow users to curate and organize their media library from a variety of sources, local or online. Common local sources include photos and videos taken from digital cameras or phone cameras, photos and videos downloaded from the internet. music ripped from CDs or downloaded from the internet, and movies and TV shows ripped from DVD or Blu-Ray discs, or recorded from a stream for saving. Sources online can include media from streaming services such as YouTube, live TV and its guide data, RSS feeds, and more.

Media center applications can play music and video playlists and can show the playback queue on what's coming next. Some applications can also create playlists by selecting the media using a remote then saving the playlist. Other applications can also play external playlists within a local network or online, playing back items that can point to a file within local storage, or stream within a local network or online.

Some applications can connect to an external media server that serves them files and information such a network-attached storage through the local network or, if configured, remotely.

=== Playback ===
Media center applications are designed with media playback and its controls are designed for large screens. The basic playback functions such as play/pause, seeking by any amount of seconds, and volume control are included in the interface or remote. Other playback functions include displaying the queue, speeding up or slowing down footage, controlling photo or video slideshow playback, and stopping.

Most applications can also play and record live TV through a TV tuner card, a capture card, IPTV, or a backend such as MythTV. They can get the guide data and usually allow users to set the exact time when to record based on the guide data, or manually. The media center then records the program then saves it as a video to the library.

Some applications can gain the ability the ability to curate, display, and stream content from services such as YouTube or Spotify through official or unofficial add-ons. One downside however, is that it may require some knowledge to obtain the API key if the service does not officially support the media center, or the API key is unavailable. In these cases, it is inconvenient for the average person and the application's growth is halted. If an official app is installed outside of the media center application, it is usually easier to use that instead.

=== Remote control ===
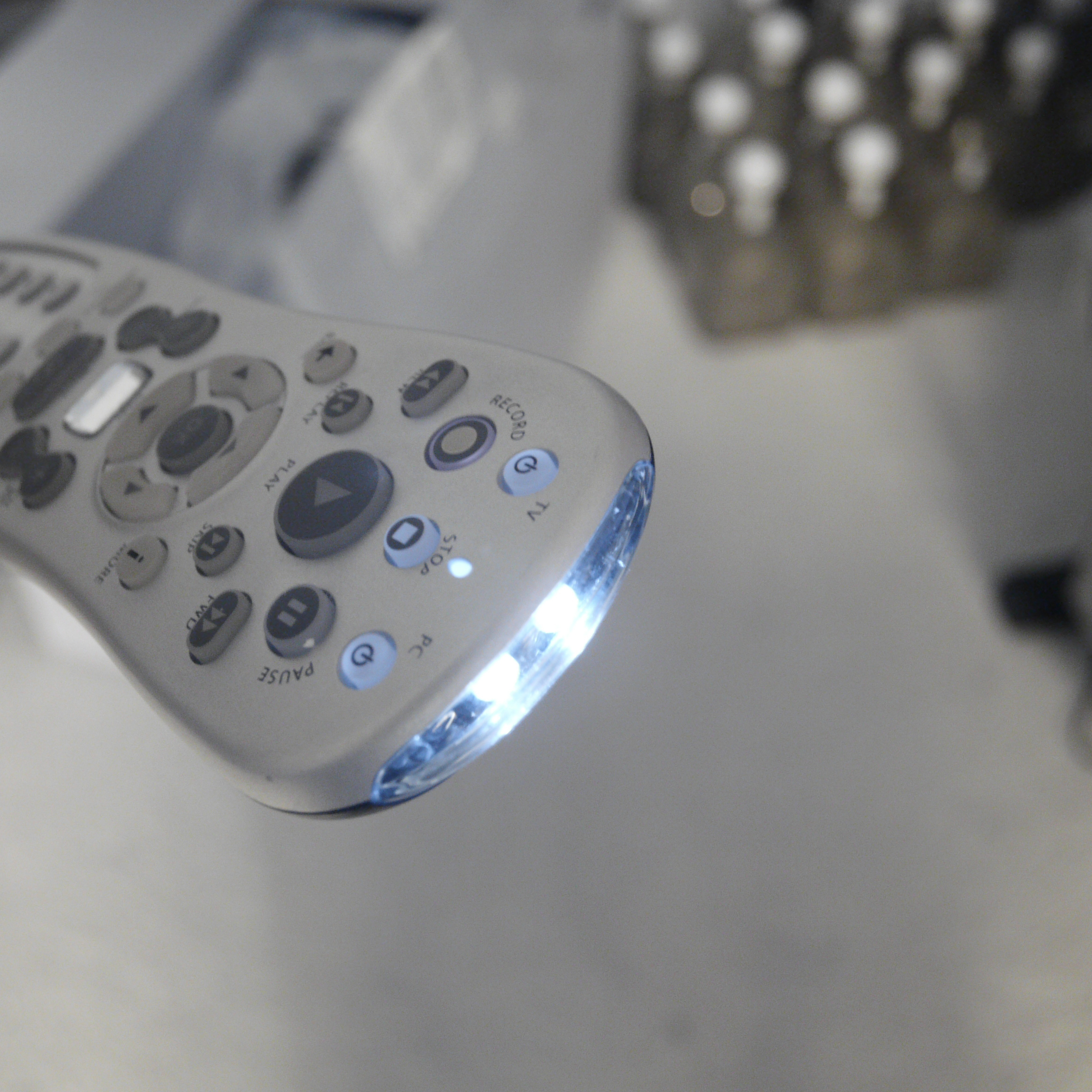
A Windows Media Center remote with its infrared LED shown.

With their main interface being designed for large screens, media center applications are usually controlled by remotes from a distance, such as a living room couch or a home cinema seat. The use of compact remotes instead of larger forms of input, such as a mouse or keyboard, makes it possible to control the interface with a single hand.

A popular remote for many applications is the Windows Media Center remote, which is supported by Windows Media Center, Kodi, MediaPortal, and JRiver Media Center. Other media center applications such as Kodi or MythTV support many other remote control types and protocols through addons.

Many media center applications support the use of smartphones as remotes, and many smartphone applications have been created to control the media center applications. Kodi, MythTV, and JRiver Media Center has their own respective smartphone apps for remote control; Kore, MythMote, and JRemote.

Kore is an Android app made by the same developers as Kodi, and is designed to control Kodi with extra features such as viewing information on what's playing on phone screens, managing playlists, and wake-on-LAN functionality for powering on the hardware with Kodi in it. An official alternative for iOS devices is Official Kodi Remote. MythMote is an Android app for controlling the front-end interface of MythTV, and JRemote can control JRiver Media Center and browse, search, and play through JRiver's media libraries on the phone screen.

A number of third party remote applications for smartphones have also been created, such as Yatse, designed to control Kodi and Plex Media Server and also has a swipe gesture control mode, and allows users to browse and search through the media center applications’ media libraries.

== Features ==
Media center applications are software applications dedicated for digital media and can have a lot of features included built-in, or have new features added by add-ons. A media center application can have the following functions:

- Create and manage a media library from folders, playlists, and online content
- Connect to a media server such as Jellyfin or a NAS
- Display what's new from the internet in widgets or the home page
- Display weather information
- Contain unique views such as thumbnail, list, or film banner view for media browsing
- Allow user interface customization through background ambience, sound effects, and themes
- Perform music and video playback and seeking
- Display music album art while playing
- Display music visualizations
- Display photos and photo slideshows
- Create or display photo albums
- Play or create music and video playlists
- Create and play auto playlists based on artist, genre, year, and more
- Aggregate movie and TV show information from the internet
- Enable media streaming from services such as YouTube, Netflix, or Spotify
- Display and record live TV through a TV tuner card, a capture card, IPTV, or a backend like MythTV
- Display movie pre-rolls
- Perform video game emulation
- Create shortcuts to external programs such as those in Windows for extra utility
- Allow remote control through Wi-Fi or Bluetooth remotes, game controllers, smartphones, and more
- Allow custom command control through command scripts, custom devices, and more
- Allow integration into a home automation system

== Applied hardware ==
Media center applications can run on a variety of devices. They are usually run on a personal computer or a digital media player, but its features can be seen in digital media players, some smart TVs or game consoles such as the Xbox 360 or the PlayStation 4.

For operating systems that weren't made for large screens in mind, such as Microsoft Windows or MacOS, they provide a solution for the devices running these systems to be used as a powerful front-end for a large screen. They also add and enhance functionality to devices such as the Fire TV.

=== Computers ===
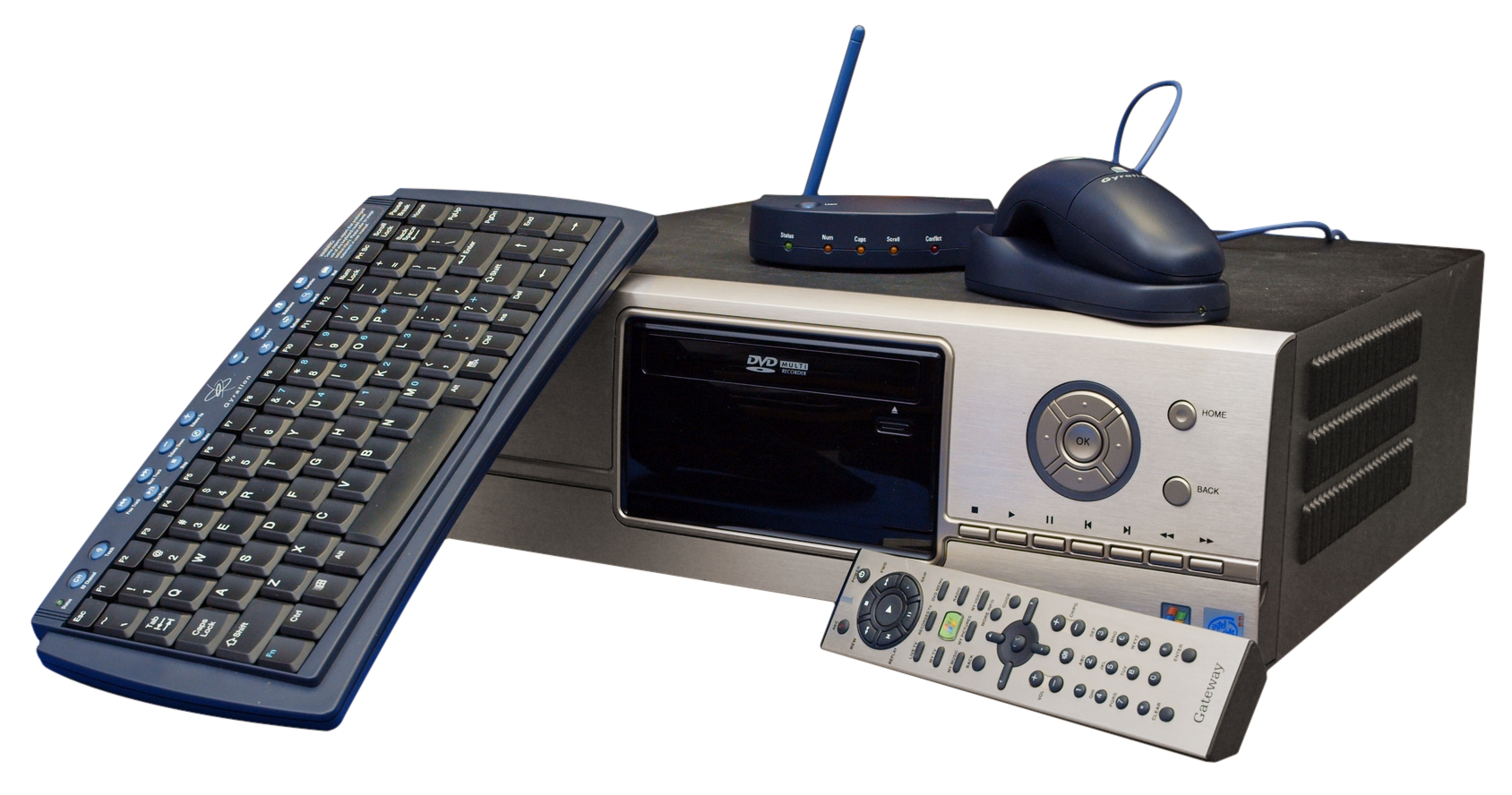
This HTPC from the 2000s, a Gateway FMC-901X, came with Windows XP MCE pre-installed and included a WMC remote and its receiver. It also has some buttons and a display on its front.

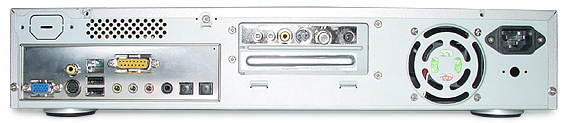
This HTPC has a diverse selection of ports on its rear side.

Computers may use a long HDMI cable to serve a large screen inside or outside a room while still maintaining desktop functionality on a desk, be placed near a large screen or a projector for easy cable routing, or be bought for this purpose. On normal computers, TV tuner or capture cards expand a computer with local live TV playback and recording functionality, and optical disc drives enable the computer for disc playback.

Computers can be solely dedicated for use in a living room with a large screen or a home cinema. Such computers are called home theater PCs (HTPCs) and are defined by their dedicated use for large screens and their combination with the application. They can come in a variety of form factors, such as a mini PC form factor, and they can also be on low power, saving electricity in the long run.

Some HTPCs nowadays or those during the 2000s such as those with Windows XP MCE may have unique features such as bundled remotes and receivers, a diverse selection of ports such as DVI or RCA, large hard disk drives, extra slots for more hard disk drives, built-in volume sliders, or built-in displays for information such as volume alongside the typical TV tuner cards and optical disk drives.

Media center applications provide a solution for computers to be used as a front-end and can take advantage of a computer's processing power to display advanced user interfaces with lots of widgets, advanced music visualizations, display and transcode codecs such as H.265 without stuttering, emulate video games, or add shortcuts to OS programs such as Steam Big Picture or other programs within the application.

On Windows, it is possible to sign in automatically and boot directly into a media center application using Registry Editor and Task Scheduler respectively, bypassing File Explorer, making it more seamless if the computer is intended for that purpose.

=== Game consoles ===
Netflix for the Xbox 360 allowed users to watch content from the instant queue that was added from computers logged in to the same account.

Game consoles, once exclusively used for playing video games by the 1990s, has expanded with media capabilities such as using the optical drive for playback, storing local media on disk or on an external flash or hard drive via USB, displaying the media in a 10-foot interface, playing music in the background while a game is playing, and more. Apps such as YouTube, Netflix or Spotify enables consoles for streaming from said services officially.

Consoles such as the Xbox 360 and the PlayStation 3 even has advanced music visualizations that take advantage of their processing power; the former console's visualization is called Neon, and the PlayStation 3 and Wii includes Photo Gallery and Photo Channel respectively for the viewing and organization of home photos and slideshow playback, the former of which can create albums and organize by face, scene, and more, and the latter of which is preinstalled and can display home video.

Game consoles have most features of a media center application already included besides live TV, but some consoles such as the Xbox One are compatible with some media center applications such as Kodi, which expands their functionality.

=== Digital media players ===
Digital media players are compact and low-power devices which can run from a TV or projector's USB outlet. They are usually meant for media streaming from services such as YouTube, Netflix, or Spotify, but can also have local media functions built-in. They are faster and more powerful than a smart TV, but less powerful than computers and game consoles, and are easy to setup, making them convenient for most people compared to computers.

Digital media players can have an app store which lets users install apps that expand its functionality. Some app stores can also have dedicated media center applications such as the Plex app available to install. Other digital media players, for example the Fire TV, can install apps such as Kodi outside of its app store.

== List of media center applications ==
Since the early 2000s, various media center applications have been released for various purposes and operating systems. Applications such as Windows Media Center and MediaPortal are exclusive to a single operating system, while others such as MythTV and SageTV have a focus on live TV functionality.

=== MediaPortal ===
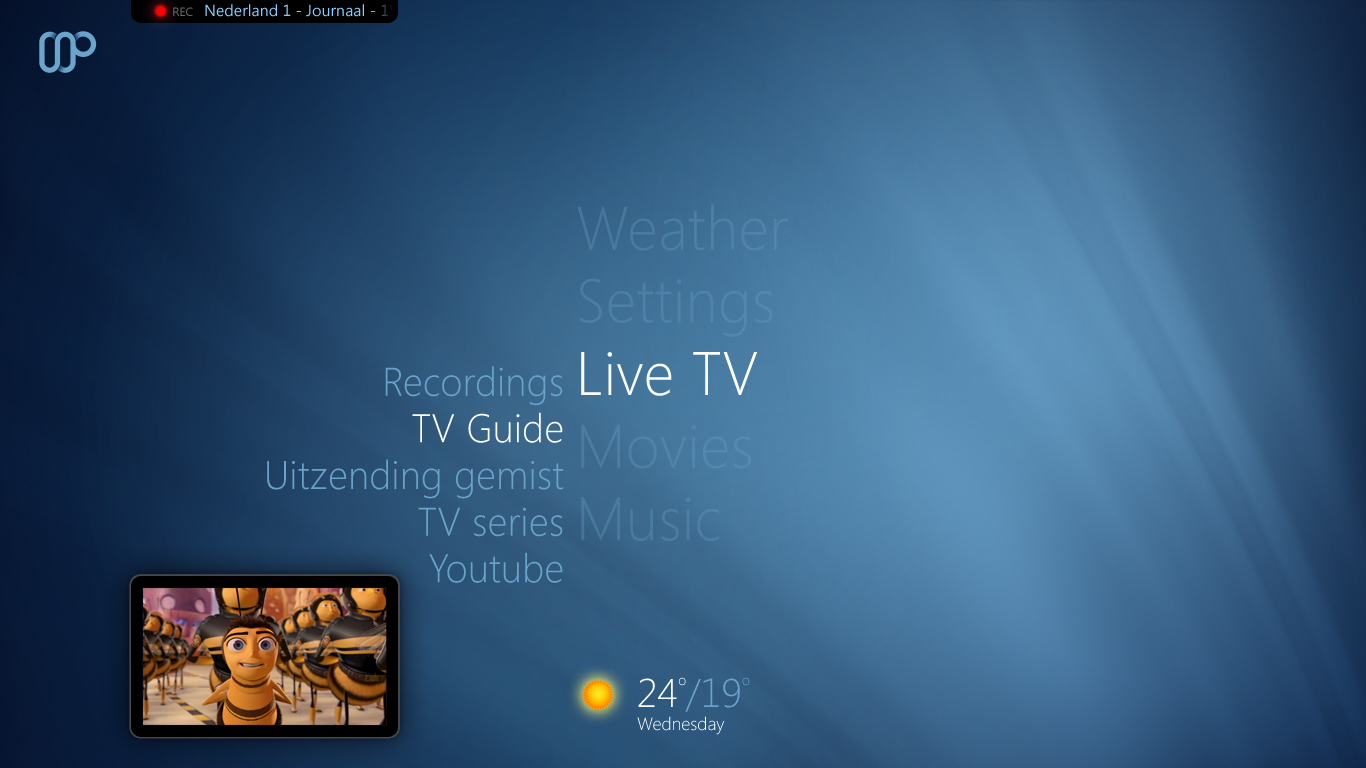
MediaPortal 1 using the Maya skin with a Picture-in-Picture.

MediaPortal is a free and open-source Windows exclusive media center application that started development in 2004 and left beta status on December 2008, and is often considered as an alternative to Windows Media Center. MediaPortal has many functions including internet radio and live TV playback and recording, music visualization, home photo and video slideshow playback, DVD and Blu-Ray playback, RSS feed aggregation, and displaying weather forecasts. It is compatible with Windows Media Center remotes and pressing the center green button opens MediaPortal.

It presents the content on its fully customizable 10-foot interface and has many skins to install, and plug-ins expand MediaPortal's functionality in a variety of ways, including scraping movie and TV show information from a database, syncing play history with an online service such as Trakt.tv, streaming from online services, displaying RSS feed information, and more, though there are more themes and plug-ins available for MediaPortal 1 than MediaPortal 2.

=== Kodi ===
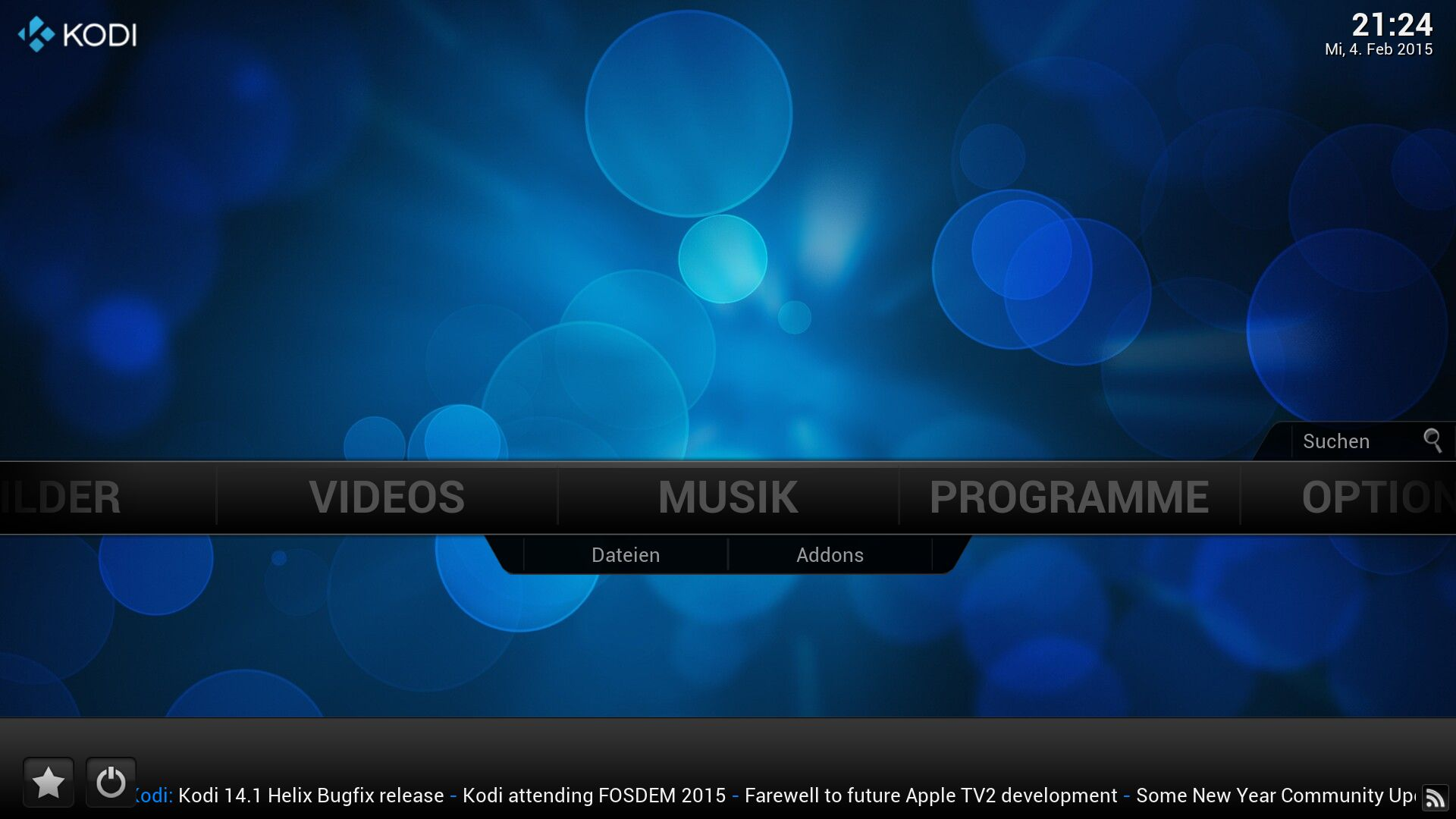
The Confluence theme was the default theme for Kodi since 2009 before version 17, Krypton, released in 2017.

Kodi (formerly XBMC) is a free and open-source media center application originally created as a homebrew mod for the original Xbox in 2002, that expanded to multiple platforms including Windows, Fire TV, and Linux. It has support for many remote control options including smartphones via Wi-Fi, game controllers, receivers for many remotes, and more. Kodi has robust media library organization capabilities and supports many codecs out of the box. It can play photos, videos, music, movies, TV shows, and live TV.

Kodi has a diverse library of add-ons that expand the application's features due to its open-source nature. Add-ons include, but are not limited to: movie and TV show information scraping, live TV clients, weather forecast display, extra remote control options, or music visualizations. Add-ons can provide streaming from services such as YouTube or Spotify, though this usually requires an API key due to no official solution from said streaming services.

The user interface is fully customizable and many themes have been created for Kodi. Users can download and install custom themes and sound effects that change the look and feel of Kodi, and some themes come with built-in options to customize the theme by adding or removing sections or widgets, changing the layout of the theme, or changing the background dynamically. Themes can change the views of content to many forms such as film banner view or list with information view.

=== Plex app ===
The Plex app is a cross-platform multimedia and media center application commonly used as a front-end for a Plex Media Server back-end for the display and playback of photos, videos, music, movies, and TV shows, but it also supports ad-supported movie streaming, live TV playback and recording from many channels, displaying movie and TV show information and where it is streamed, displaying newsfeeds, and combines local content with online content in the Plex app. Some features such as live TV are only available with a paid Plex Pass subscription or lifetime license.

The Plex app supports a wide range of platforms including Android, Android TV, Apple TV, Chromecast, Fire TV, Roku, iOS, iPadOS, macOS, PlayStation, Sonos, webOS, Windows and Xbox. On most platforms, the user interface is 10-foot and is controlled by the device's remote, though the mobile and desktop apps don't have this interface.

=== MythTV ===
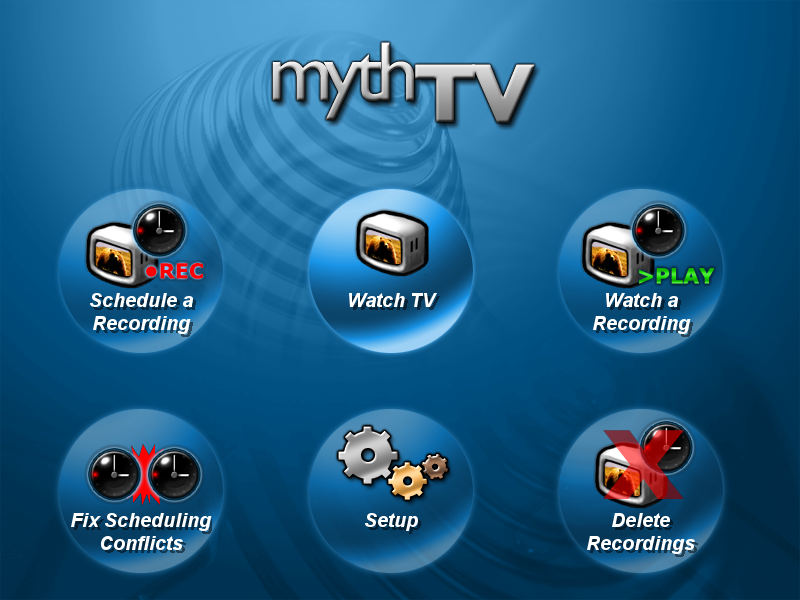
The MythTV frontend's former user interface, Blue, only supported live TV functionality around 2004 and has since been replaced.

MythTV, primarily used as a live TV backend, is a free and open-source media center application and digital video recorder software released in 2002. MythTV has a backend DVR solution and a frontend solution and can either be both installed on the same hardware, or be installed separately in different hardware.

MythTV has many live TV features, including rewinding, automatic commercial skipping, video capture from unencrypted sources, and more. The frontend's user interface is fully customizable and also features media library organization. It can display photos, videos, music, movies and TV shows, RSS feed information, weather forecasts, and more through optional modules. MythTV can be controlled by smartphones via an Android app called MythMote or other remotes.

=== JRiver Media Center ===
Screenshot of JRiver Media Center's Theater mode, which is a 10-foot interface and can be controlled by remotes.

JRiver Media Center is a paid multimedia application that also has a 10-foot interface called Theater mode. It has a comprehensive list of settings which greatly expand its capabilities, and skins for Standard or Theater mode customize the interface. JRiver Media Center has many views for Standard and Theater mode separately, such as list, jukebox, thumbnail, showroom, and more. It can be controlled by remotes through a receiver, or by smartphones through its associated JRemote application.

JRiver Media Center has a wide variety of use cases, including photo and video organization and slideshow playback, music organization and tag management, movie and TV show information aggregation, independent media playback to multiple outputs, playing podcasts or internet radio, streaming from the local network, and more.

=== Other applications ===
==== NextPVR Player ====
NextPVR is a personal video recorder application that succeeded GB-PVR and also has a media center application called NextPVR Player. The player can watch and record live TV from the PVR application, browse through the TV guide, display content in a horizontal or vertical view, play the recorded videos, play photos, videos, music, and DVD discs. There are also plug-ins for NextPVR Player such as weather information and internet radio.

NextPVR also has a web interface for devices with a browser to play and record live TV and play recorded videos, and Kodi with the NextPVR add-on allows it to be controlled by Kodi's interface and allows live TV playback from NextPVR in Kodi.

=== Discontinued applications ===
==== Windows Media Center ====
Screenshot of Windows Media Center's home screen, with music, movies, home pictures and videos, and extras shown.

Windows Media Center is a discontinued media center application included with Windows XP MCE, Windows Vista, and Windows 7, and it supports licensed Windows Media Center remotes and receivers for remote control. It displays the content on a multiple row horizontal strip that users scroll through and includes multiple sorting options above. There is also a search box above for searching media in a folder.

Windows Media Center can display and play home and downloaded photos and videos, music, and movies and TV shows with on-screen controls and also supports live TV through a TV tuner card and can display the guide and record live TV for saving.

==== Front Row ====
Screenshot of Apple's Front Row main menu.

Front Row is a discontinued media center application by Apple released in October 2005 for Mac computers and Apple TV digital media players. It can browse through and play movies, TV shows, music, podcasts, and photos on its 10-foot interface and is controlled by an Apple Remote or a keyboard. It can also play optical disks or media from the internet. Front Row was discontinued with the release of OS X Lion in 2011 and has no official successor.

==== GB-PVR ====
GB-PVR's main menu.

GB-PVR is a discontinued personal video recorder and media center application and featured live TV playback and recording, scheduling recording of a TV program, browsing and searching through the TV guide, and local photo, video, and music playback. It was discontinued and was succeeded by NextPVR.

==== Beyond TV ====
Beyond TV is a discontinued digital video recorder and media center application for Windows. It was used to play and record live TV, view the TV guide, schedule recording of a TV program, skip commercials, compress TV recordings, and burn DVDs with the recorded TV program in its 10-foot interface. Beyond TV was discontinued in 2010.

==== Boxee ====
Boxee was a cross-platform media center application that emphasized social networking features designed for large screens. It enabled its users to view, rate and recommend content to their friends through many social network services and multimedia related features.

Boxee supported a wide range of multimedia formats, and it included features such as playlists, music visualizations, slideshows, weather forecast information, and a variety of third-party plugins. Boxee used to play most audio and video file containers, and used to display images from many sources, including optical drives, USB flash drives, streaming from the internet, and local area network shares.

Marketed as the first ever "Social Media Center", the first public alpha of Boxee was released on 16 June 2008. The UI design of the Alpha prototype was designed with design firm Method Incorporated, who also created Boxee's brand identity. The first public beta version was officially released for all previously supported platforms on 7 January 2010. Boxee gained the ability to watch live TV on the Boxee Box using a live TV stick in January 2012. By the end of 2012 the developers had discontinued all desktop versions and support. In July 2013, Samsung bought Boxee Inc.'s assets and has since discontinued the company.

== See also ==
- Digital video recorder
- Streaming media
- List of streaming media services
- Media player software
- Image organizer
- Home cinema
