= Entertainment system =

An entertainment system is a system of entertainment usually of electronic components that handle audiovisual, computers, video games, etc.

More specifically, an entertainment system may refer to:

- Home cinema
- Home theater PC
- In-car entertainment
- In-flight entertainment
- Video game console
