= Home theater PC =

PC meant to be used in a home theater setting

A Mac Mini as a home theater PC showing Apple's discontinued Front Row media center application

A home theater PC (HTPC) or media center computer is a convergent device that combines some or all the capabilities of a personal computer with a media center application that focuses on video, photo, audio playback, and sometimes video recording functionality. Since the mid-2000s, other types of consumer electronics, including game consoles and dedicated media devices, have crossed over to manage video and music content. HTPCs are defined by their dedicated use for large screens like televisions or projectors, and their combination with media center applications, though said applications are also usually run on regular computers and digital media players.

HTPCs and other convergent devices integrate components of a home cinema into a unit co-located with a home entertainment system. An HTPC system typically has a media center application with remote control and the software interface normally has a 10-foot (3 m) user interface design so that it can be comfortably viewed at typical television viewing distances. An HTPC can be purchased pre-configured with the required hardware and software needed to add video programming or music to the PC, or they can also be pieced together to build a system out of discrete components as part of a software-based HTPC.

Since the mid-2000s, digital media players and smart TV software has been incorporated into consumer electronics through software or hardware changes including video game consoles, Blu-ray players, networked media players, televisions, and set-top boxes. The increased availability of specialized devices, coupled with paid and free digital online content, now offers an alternative to multipurpose (and more costly) personal computers.

== History ==
The HTPC as a concept is the product of several technology innovations including high-powered home computers, digital media, and the shift from standard-resolution CRT to high-definition monitors, projectors, and large-screen televisions.

Integrating televisions and personal computers dates back to the late 1980s with tuner cards that could be added to Amiga computers via the Video Toaster. This adaptation would allow a small video window to appear on the screen with broadcast or cable content. Apple Computer also developed the Macintosh TV in late 1993 that included a tuner card built into a Macintosh LC 520 chassis but quickly withdrew from the market with only 10,000 units shipped.

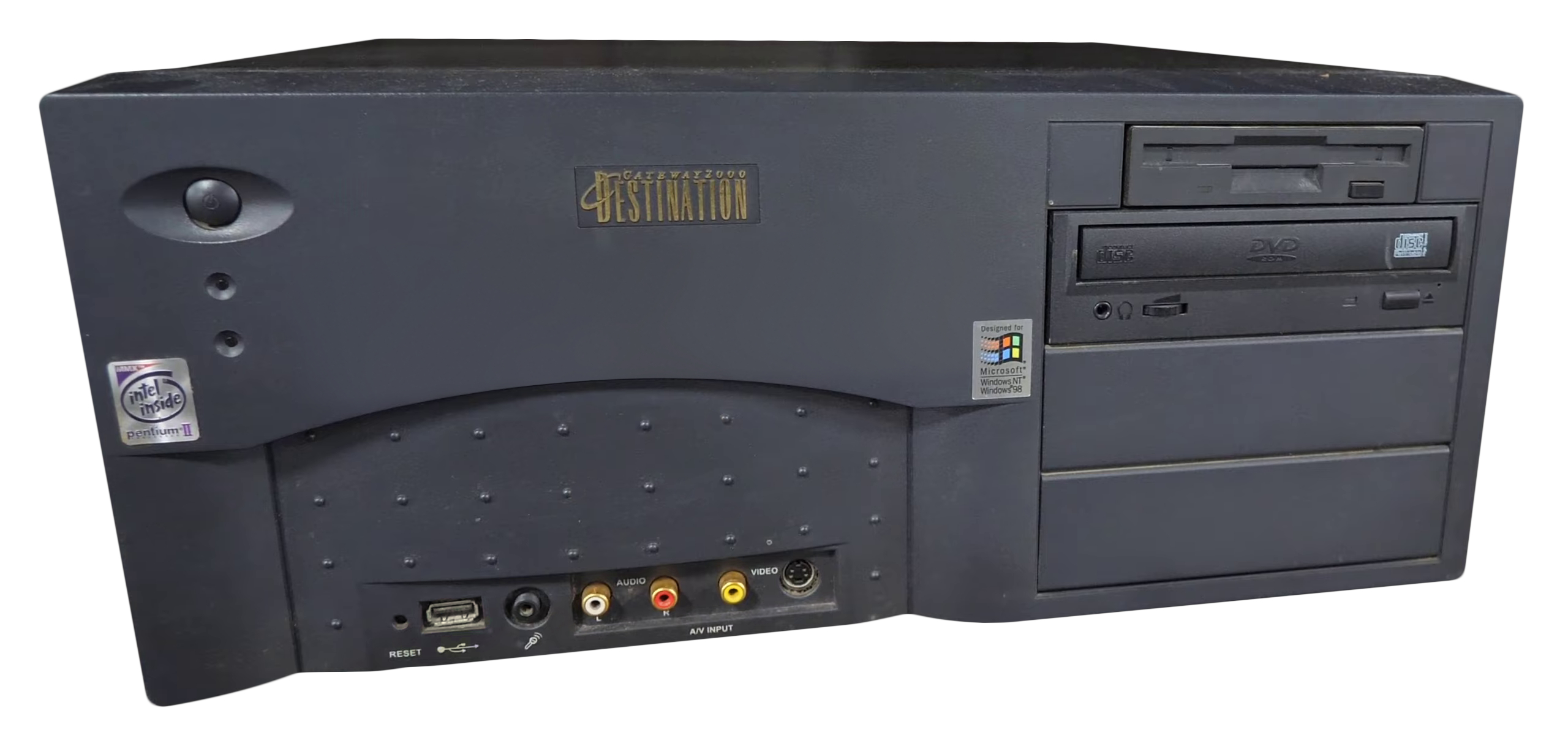
The Gateway 2000 Destination, home theater PC first released in 1996

In 1996 Gateway 2000 unveiled the Destination computer, which included a tuner card and video card. The unit cost $4,000 and mostly integrated television viewing and computer functions on one color monitor. The Destination was called a "PC-TV Combo" but by December the term "Home-theater PC" appeared in mainstream media: "The home theater PC will be a combination entertainment and information appliance."

By 2000, DVD players had become relatively ubiquitous and consumers were seeking ways to improve the picture. The value of using a computer instead of standalone DVD player drove more usage of the PC as a home media device. In particular, the desire for progressive scanning DVD players (480p instead of 480i) with better video fidelity led some consumers to consider their computers instead of very expensive DVD players.

As DVD players dropped in price, so did PCs and their related video-processing and storage capabilities. In 2000, DVD decryption software using the DeCSS algorithm allowed DVD owners to consolidate their DVD video libraries on hard drives. Innovations such as TiVo and ReplayTV allowed viewers to store and timeshift broadcast content using specially designed computers. ReplayTV for instance ran on a VxWorks platform. Incorporating these capabilities into PCs was well within the ability of a computer hobbyist who was willing to build and program these systems. Key benefits of these DIY projects included lower cost and more features. Advancements in hardware identified another weak link: the absence of media management software to make it easy to display and control the video from a distance.

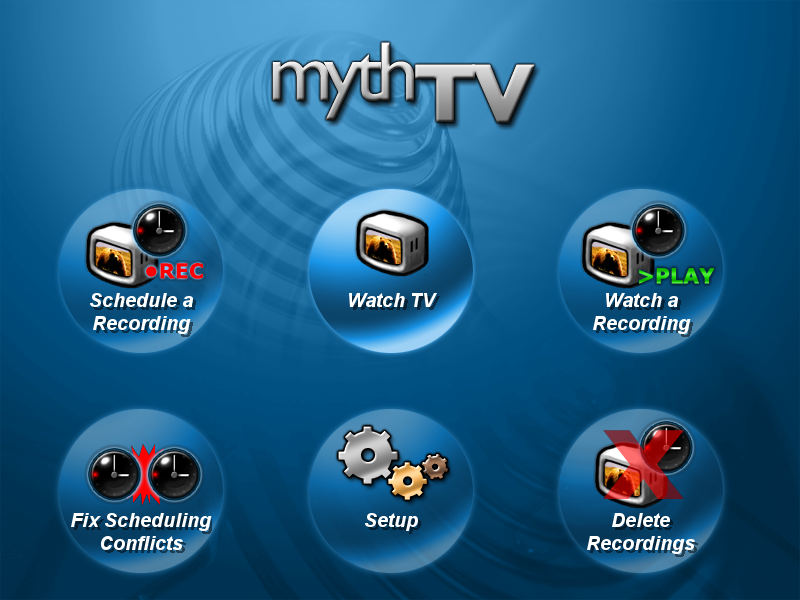
Original MythTV Home Screen c. 2002

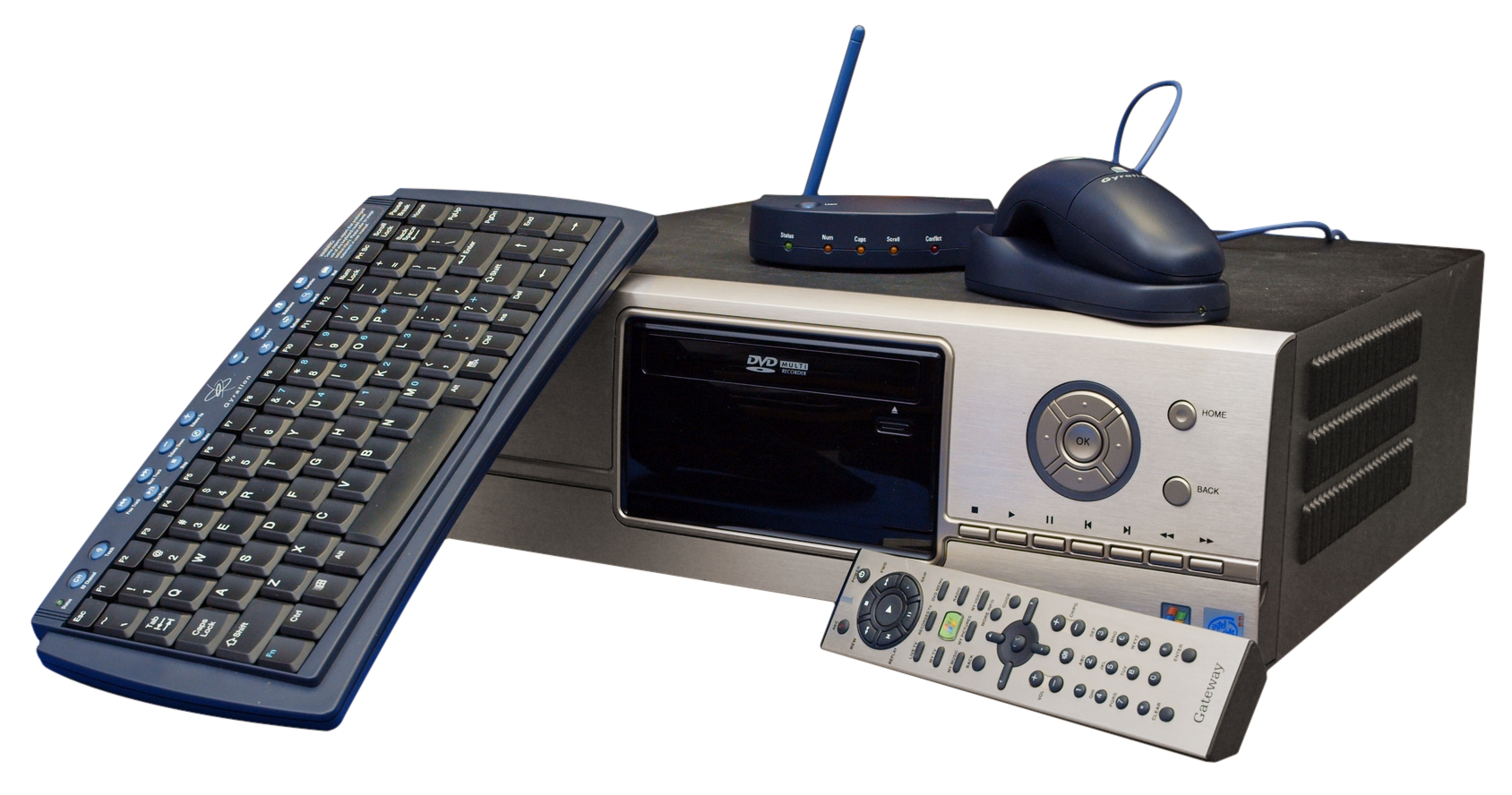
The Gateway FMC-901X was bundled with Windows XP MCE and included a WMC remote and its receiver, and some buttons and a display on its front.

By the early 2000s, major software developments also facilitated media management, hardware integration, and content presentation; these software applications are called media center applications. MythTV, released in 2002, provided a free and open source solution using Linux. The concept was to combine a digital tuner with digital video recording, program guides, and computer capabilities with a 10-foot (3 m) user interface. Kodi, formerly XBMC, was another free and open software project released in the same year as MythTV. It started with re-purposing the Xbox as a home theater PC but has since been ported to many other platforms such as Windows, Linux, and more. Various derivatives of Kodi were created, including Boxee and Plex, the latter of which expanded to other fields such as media servers, streaming media, and live TV. Mainstream commercial software packages included Microsoft's Windows Media Center, included with Windows XP MCE, Windows Vista, and Windows 7, and Apple's Front Row (2005), bundled with Mac OS X until 10.7 Lion in 2011.

Many HTPCs during the 2000s were bundled with Windows XP MCE as a commercial HTPC package for consumers, and by early 2006, other commercial examples of this integration included the Mac Mini which had the Apple Remote, 5.1 digital audio, and an updated Front Row interface that would play shared media. Because of these features and the Mini's small form factor, consumers began using the Mini as a Mac-based home theater PC.

As digital cable and satellite became the norm, media center applications became more dependent on external decoder boxes, and the subscription costs that came with them. For instance, MythTV is capable of capturing unencrypted HDTV streams, such as those broadcast over the air or on cable using a QAM tuner. However, most U.S. cable and satellite set-top boxes provide only encrypted HD streams for "non-basic" content, which can be decoded only by OpenCable-approved hardware or software. In September 2009, OEM restrictions were officially lifted for cableCARD devices, opening up the possibility of HTPC integration.

The advent of fully digital HDTV displays helped to complete the value and ease of use of a HTPC system. Digital projectors, plasma and LCDs often came pre-configured to accept computer video outputs including VGA, DVI and component video. Furthermore, both the computers and the displays could include video scalers to better conform the image to the screen format and resolutions. Likewise, computers also included HDMI ports that carry both audio and video signals to home video displays or AV receivers.

The simplified integration of computer and home theater displays has allowed for fully digital content distribution over the internet. For instance, by the mid-2000s, Netflix "watch instantly" subscribers could view streaming content using their HTPCs with a browser or with plug-ins with applications such as Plex and Kodi. Similar plug-ins are also available for Hulu, YouTube, and broadcasters such as NBC, CBS and PBS.

== HTPC characteristics ==
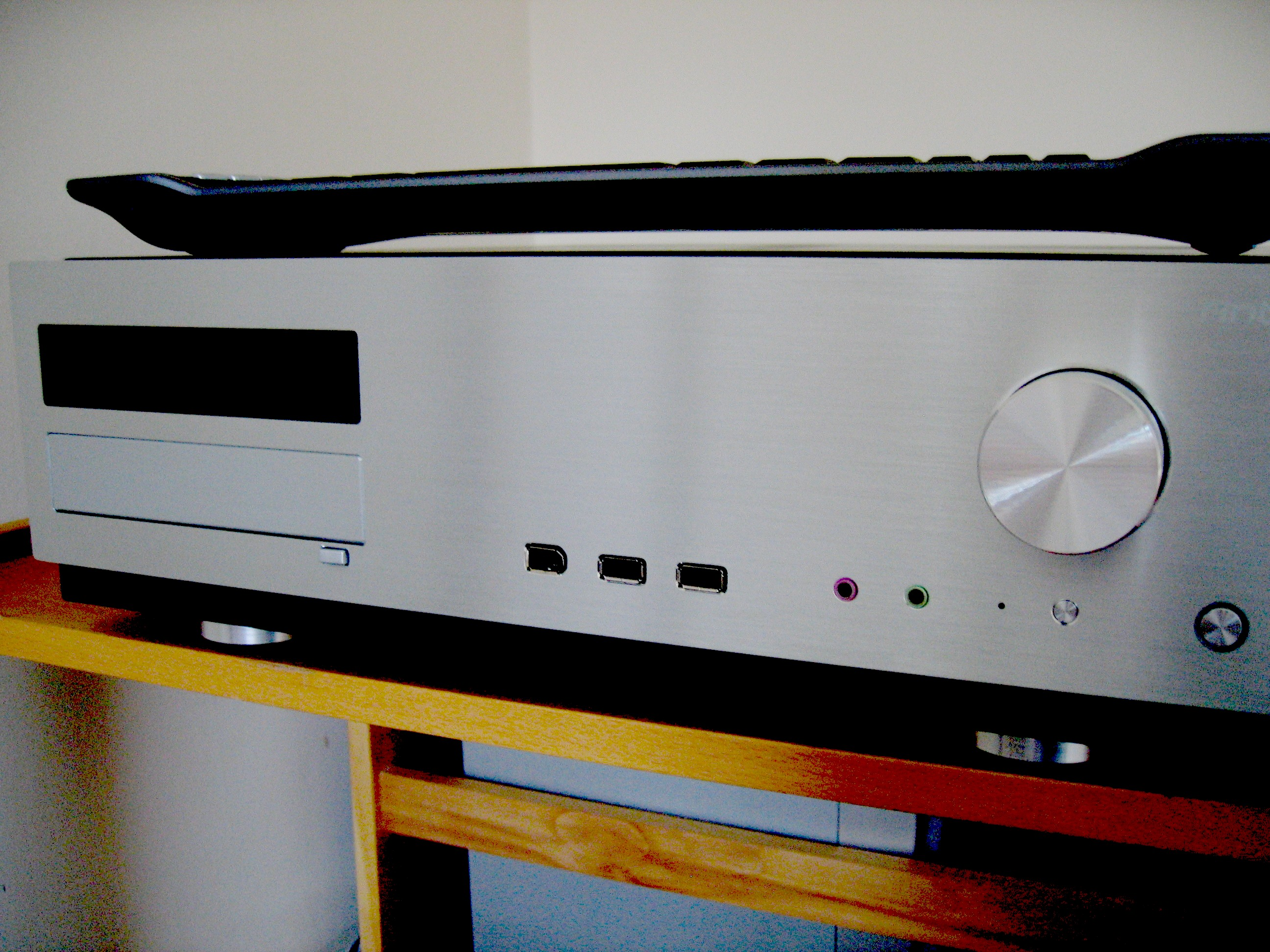
Antec Fusion V2 home theater PC case with VFD display, 5.25" drive bay, volume control and some ports on front and keyboard on top

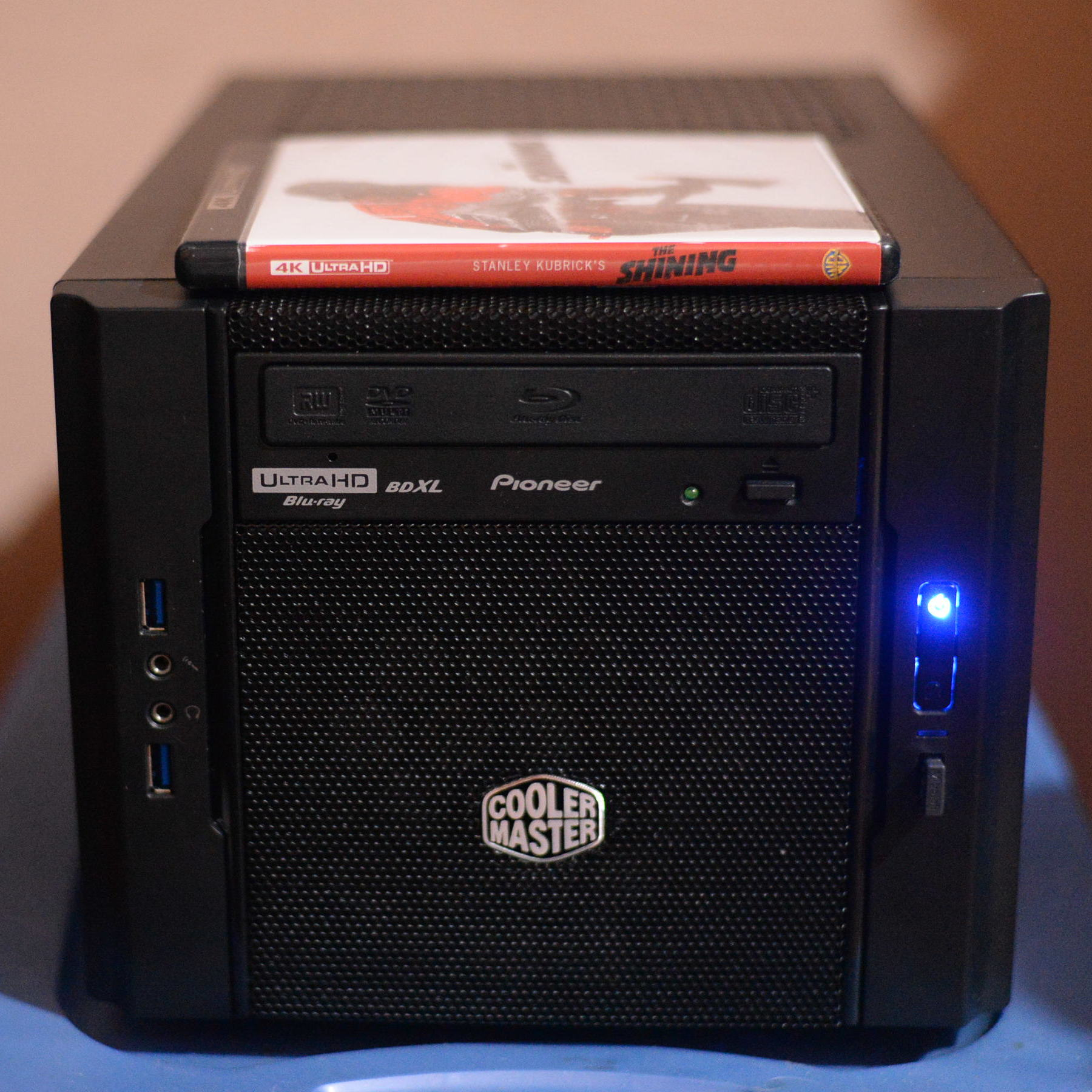
Home theater PC capable of playing Ultra HD Blu-ray discs

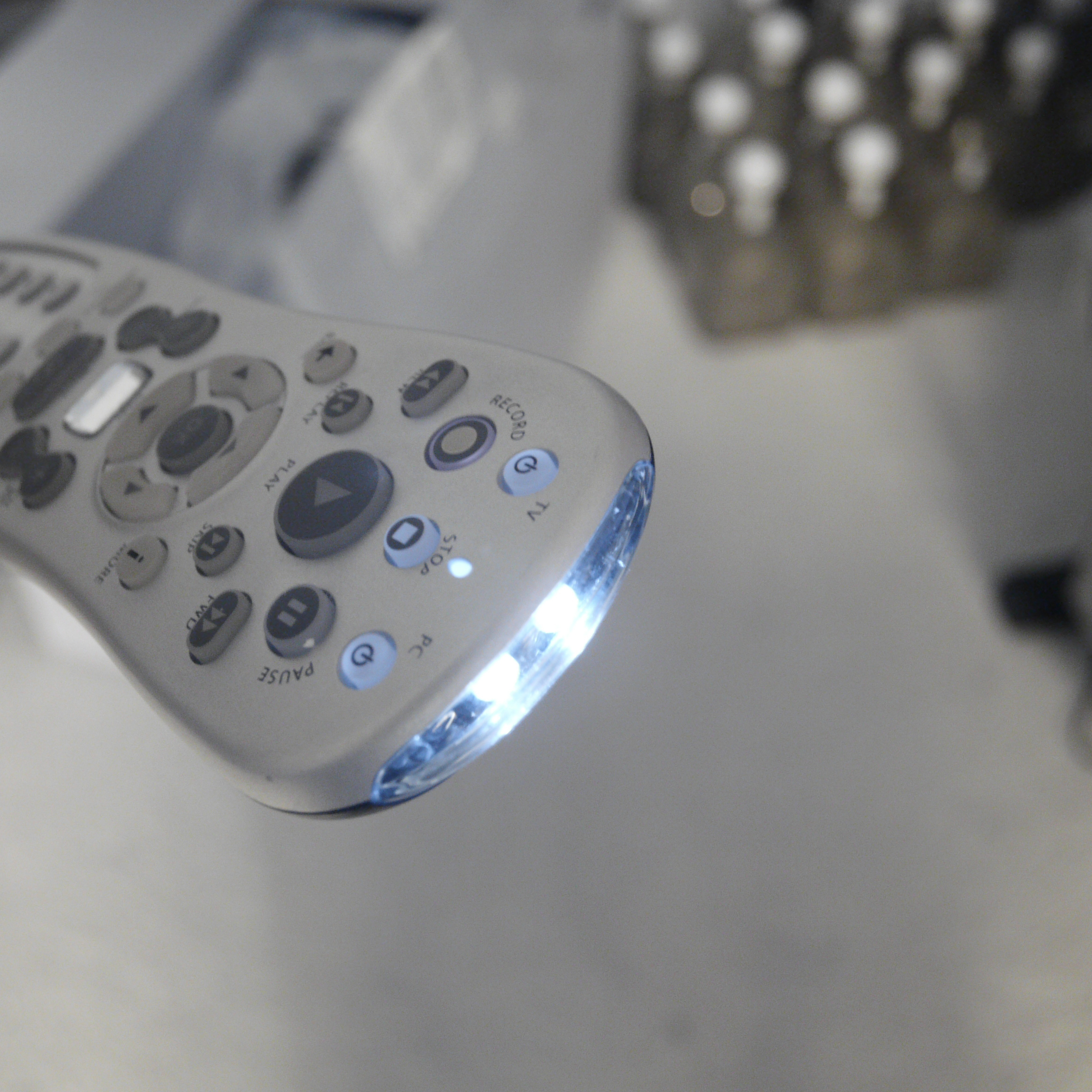
A Windows Media Center remote with its infrared LED shown

The media itself may be stored, received by terrestrial, satellite or cable broadcasting or streamed from the internet. Stored media is kept either on a local hard drive or on network attached storage. Some applications are capable of doing other tasks, such as finding news (RSS) from the Internet.

Beyond functioning as a standard PC, normally HTPCs have some additional characteristics:

=== Television connectivity ===
Standard PC units are usually connected to a CRT or LCD, while HTPCs are designed to be connected to a television. HTPCs usually feature a TV-out option, using either an HDMI, DVI, DisplayPort, component video, VGA (for some LCD televisions), S-Video, or composite video output.

=== Remote control ===
The Plex smartphone application used to control playback on a computer

Integrating a HTPC into a typical living room requires a way of controlling it from a distance. Many TV tuner/capture cards include remote controls for use with the applications included with the card. Media center applications such as Kodi, MythTV, MediaPortal, SageTV, NextPVR, Boxee, and Beyond TV support the use of Windows Media Center remotes and other remote controls. Another option is an in-air mouse pointer such as the Wii Remote, GlideTV Navigator, or Loop Pointer, which gives cursor control from a distance. It is also possible to use common wireless keyboards and other peripherals to achieve the same effect (though the range may not be as long as a typical remote control's).

Some HTPCs, such as the Plex/Mac Mini combination, support programmable remote controls designed for a wide range of typical home theater devices. More recent innovations include remote-control applications for Android and iOS smartphones for applications such as Kodi or the former Plex Media Player.

=== External and networked storage devices ===
Because of the nature of the HTPC, units require higher-than-average capacities for storage of pictures, music, television shows, videos, and other multimedia. Designed almost as a 'permanent storage' device, space can quickly run out on these devices. Because of restrictions on internal space for hard disk drives and a desire for low noise levels, many HTPC units can use or connect to a Network Attached Storage (NAS) device, a media server software such as Jellyfin, or another type of network-connected file server.

=== TV tuner cards ===
A TV tuner card is a computer component that allows television signals to be received by a computer. Most TV tuners also function as video capture cards, allowing them to record television programs onto a hard disk. Several manufacturers build combined TV tuner plus capture cards for PCs. Many such cards offer hardware MPEG encoding to reduce the computing requirements. Some cards are designed for analog TV signals such as standard definition cable or off the air television, while others are designed for high-definition digital TV.

=== Network TV tuner ===
A network TV tuner or TV gateway is a TV server that converts TV signal from satellite, cable or antenna to IP. With multiple TV tuners, the TV gateway can stream multiple TV channels to devices across the network. Several TV gateway manufacturers build the device to stream the entire DVB stream, relying on the host player device to process the feed and to capture/record, while other devices such as VBox Home TV Gateway provide a variety of option from full PVR and live TV features, to streaming of specific DVB layers to support less powerful devices and to save network bandwidth.

=== Quiet/minimal noise ===
A common user complaint with using standard PCs as HTPC units is background noise, especially in quieter film scenes. Most personal computers are designed for maximum performance, while the functions of a HTPC system may not be processor-intensive. Thus, passive cooling systems, low-noise fans, vibration-absorbing elastic mounts for fans and hard drives, and other noise-minimizing devices are used in place of conventional cooling systems.

== Software ==
Software options for HTPCs exist for each of the major operating systems: Microsoft Windows, Mac OS X and Linux. These software applications are called media center applications and HTPCs are defined by their combination with these applications.

=== Linux, Unix, and BSD ===
A number of media center software solutions exist for Linux-, Unix-, and BSD-based operating systems; for example MythTV is a fully fledged integrated suite of software which incorporates TV recording, video library, video game library, image/picture gallery, information portal and music collection playback among other capabilities. Kodi is also available (as it is for many platforms), and can be used to present all the available media including TV programmes recorded by MythTV. Freevo, VDR, SageTV and Boxee are other solutions.

Linux, partially due to its opensource nature, is available as customized versions including the media center applications pre-installed and with superfluous software removed. Examples include MythBuntu (based on Xubuntu), and Ubuntu TV or Kodibuntu (formerly XBMCbuntu), (all based on Ubuntu).

LinuxMCE is a complete home automation solution including lighting/curtains, security, and MythTV capability.

Contemporary efforts on a TV based software package includes Plasma Bigscreen.

=== Mac OS X ===
For Mac OS X versions before 10.7 (Lion), HTPC functionality is built into the operating system itself. Specifically, the applications Front Row and Cover Flow, used in conjunction with the Apple Remote, allow users easily to browse and view any multimedia content stored on their Macs. With the July 2011 release of Mac OS X Lion, Front Row has been discontinued.

Several third-party applications provide HTPC support, including Plex, and Kodi.

Beyond the operating system itself, add-on hardware-plus-software combinations (for adding more full-featured HTPC abilities to any Mac) include Elgato's EyeTV series PVRs, AMD's "ATI Wonder" external USB 2.0 TV-tuners, and various individual devices from third-party manufacturers.

=== Microsoft Windows ===
For Microsoft Windows, a common approach was to install a version that contains the Windows Media Center (Home Premium, Professional, Enterprise or Ultimate for Windows 7 or Home Premium or Ultimate for Windows Vista). Windows Media Center included additional capabilities that covered the DVR functions of HTPCs and regular computers, including free program guide information and automatic program recording. Windows 7, Windows Vista Home Premium and Windows Vista Ultimate included an MPEG2 decoder. With the introduction of Windows 8, Windows Media Center was no longer included with the operating system; instead it was necessary to buy Windows 8 Pro and then purchase the Media Center Pack via the Windows Control Panel. Windows Media Center is not available at all for Windows 10. However, it may be restored by a number of unofficial ways.

Alternative media center applications may be built with the addition of a third party software DVR to a Windows PC. SageTV, NextPVR, and DVBViewer have integrated placeshifting comparable to the Slingbox, allowing client PCs and the Hauppauge MediaMVP to be connected to the server over the network. Snapstream provides heuristic commercial detection and program recompression. When using a faster CPU, SageTV and Beyond TV can record content from TV capture cards which do not include hardware MPEG2 compression. For a free alternative, GB-PVR and MediaPortal provide full home theater support and good multi-card DVR capabilities. NextPVR also has a free client, free mediaMVP client, and free network media playback. MediaPortal provides a full client/server set-up with live TV/DVR (recorded or timeshifted) streaming. MediaPortal is open-source and offers a variety of skins and plugins for music videos, Netflix, Pandora and others.

== Digital media receivers and consumer electronics integration ==
Although digital media players are often built using similar components to personal computers, they are often smaller, quieter and less costly than the full-featured computers adapted to multi-media entertainment.

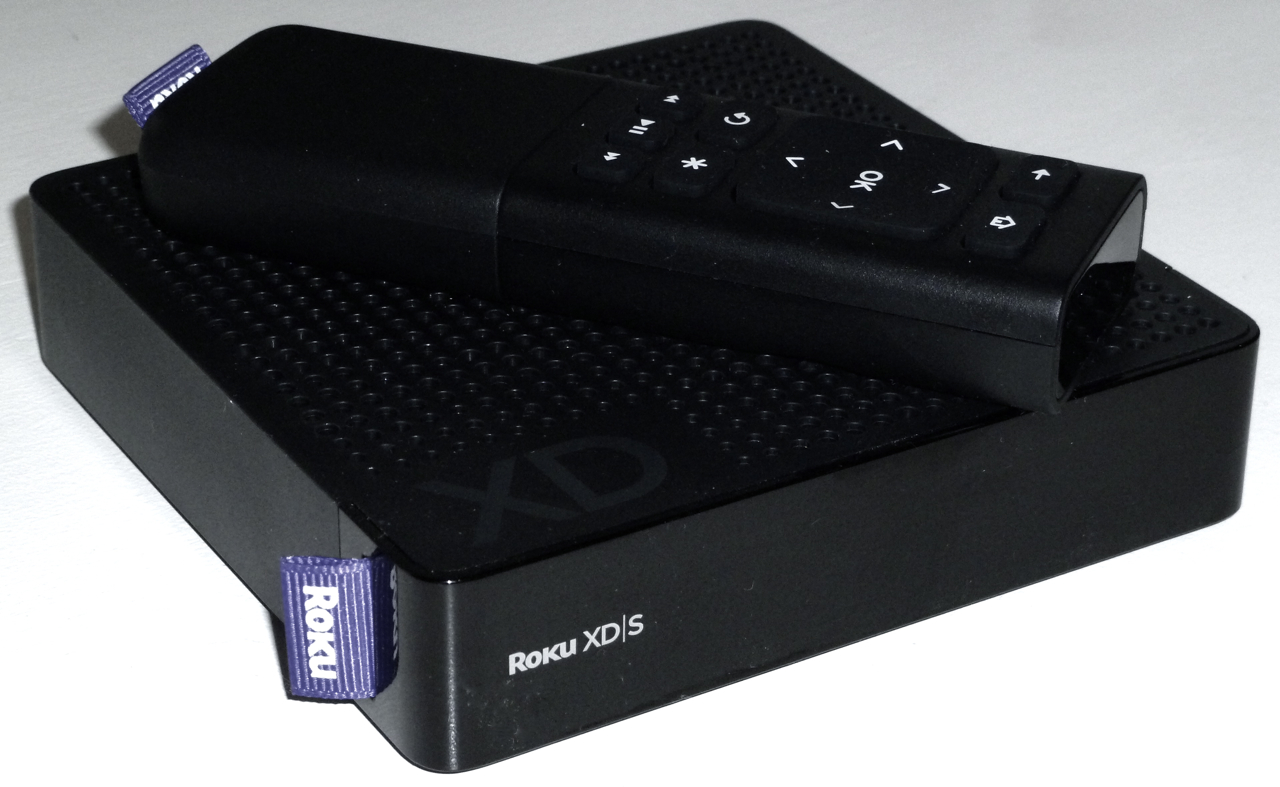
The Roku XD/S player supports streaming internet media and local media through a USB port or home media servers such as Plex.

Netflix has integrated its streaming player in many consumer electronics devices including the Xbox 360.

In recent years, convergence devices for home entertainment including gaming systems, DVRs, Blu-Ray players and dedicated devices such as the Roku have also started managing local video, music and streaming internet content. Likewise, some managed video services such as Verizon's FiOS allow users to incorporate their photographs, video, and music from their personal computers to their FiOS set-top-box including DVRs. Gaming systems such as the Nintendo Wii, Sony PlayStation 3 and the Microsoft Xbox 360 support media management beyond their original gaming orientation.

As computing power increases and costs fall, traditional media devices such as televisions have been given network capabilities. So-called Smart TVs from Sony, Samsung, and LG (to name a few) have models that allow owners to include some free or subscription media content available on the Internet. The rapid growth in the availability of online content, including music, video and games, has also made it easier for consumers to use these networked devices. YouTube, for instance, is a common plug-in available on most networked devices. Netflix has also struck deals with many consumer electronics makers to have their interface available for their streaming subscribers. This symbiotic relationship between Netflix and consumer electronics makers has helped propel Netflix to become the largest subscription video service in the U.S., using up to 20% of U.S. bandwidth at peak times.

Other digital media retailers such as Apple, Amazon.com and Blockbuster have purchase and rental options for video and music on demand. Apple in particular has developed a tightly integrated device and content management ecosystem with their iTunes Store, personal computers, iOS devices, and the Apple TV digital media receiver. The most recent version of the Apple TV, at $99, has lost the hard drive included in its predecessor and fully depends either on streaming internet content, or another computer on the home network for media.

== Impact on traditional television services ==
The convergence of content, technology, and broadband access allows consumers to stream television shows and movies to their high-definition television in competition with traditional service providers (cable TV and satellite television). The research company SNL Kagan expects 12 million households, roughly 10%, to go without cable, satellite or telco video service by 2015 using over-the-top services. This represents a new trend in the broadcast television industry, as the list of options for watching movies and TV over the Internet grows every day. Research also shows that even as traditional television service providers are trimming their customer base, adding broadband Internet customers. Nearly 76.6 million U.S. households get broadband from leading cable and telephone companies, although only a portion have sufficient speeds to support quality video streaming. Convergent devices for home entertainment will likely play a much larger role in the future of broadcast television, effectively shifting traditional revenue streams while providing consumers with more options.

== See also ==
- Apple TV
- Media center application
- Comparison of DVR software packages
- Comparison of digital media players
- Cord-cutting
- Digital video recorder
- Digital media player
- Home cinema
- Media server
- Portable media player
- Theme (computing)
- Set-top box
- Smart TV
