= MediaPortal =

Free and open-source media center application

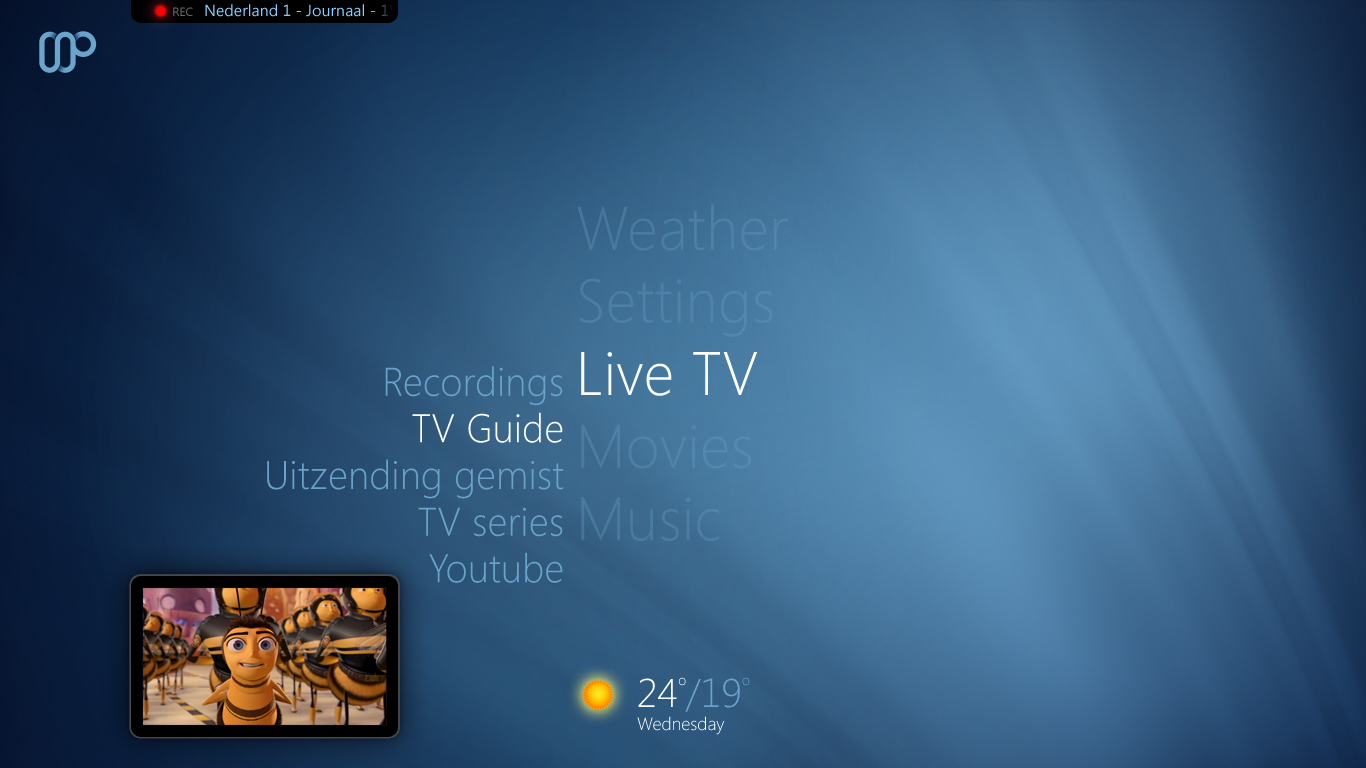
- MediaPortal with the Maya skin
- Release: 2004; 22 years ago
- Stable release: 2.5 / 23 January 2024; 2 years ago
- Written in: C#
- Operating system: Microsoft Windows
- Platform: IA-32, x64
- Type: Media center application and digital video recorder
- License: GNU General Public License
- Website: team-mediaportal.com
- Repository: github.com/MediaPortal/MediaPortal-2

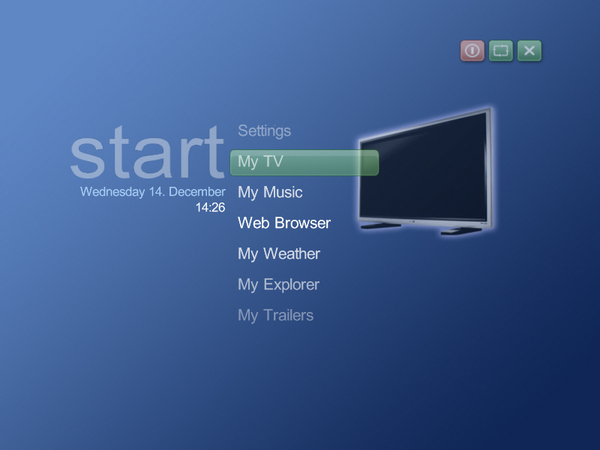
MediaPortal using a Windows XP MCE Windows Media Center-esque skin.

MediaPortal is a free and open-source media center application and digital video recorder software for Windows, often considered an alternative to Windows Media Center. It provides a 10-foot user interface for performing typical PVR/TiVo functionality, including playing, pausing, and recording live TV; playing DVDs, videos, and music; viewing pictures; and other functions. Plugins allow it to perform additional tasks, such as watching online video, listening to music from online services such as Last.fm, and launching other applications such as games. It interfaces with the hardware commonly found in HTPCs, such as TV tuners, infrared receivers, and LCD displays.

The MediaPortal source code was initially forked from XBMC (now Kodi), though it has been almost completely re-written since then. MediaPortal is designed specifically for Microsoft Windows, unlike most other open-source media center applications such as MythTV and Kodi, which are usually cross-platform.

== Features ==
- DirectX GUI
- Video Hardware Acceleration
- VMR / EVR on Windows Vista / 7
- TV / Radio (DVB-S, DVB-S2, DVB-T, DVB-C, Analog television (Common Interface, DVB radio, DVB EPG, Teletext, etc...)
- IPTV
- Recording, pause and time shifting of TV and Radio broadcasts
- Music player
- Video/DVD player
- Picture player
- Internet Streams
- Integrated Weather Forecasts
- Built-in RSS reader
- Metadata web scraping from TheTVDB and The Movie Database
- Plug ins
- Skins
- Graphical user interfaces

=== Control ===
MediaPortal can be controlled by any input device supported by the Windows operating system, such as a PC Remote; keyboard and mouse; a Gamepad, Kinect, Wii Remote; or Android / iOS/ WebOS / S60 handset devices.

== See also ==
- Home theater PC
- Windows Media Center
- Windows XP Media Center Edition (MCE)
- Windows Media Center Extender
- Windows Media Connect
- Windows Media Player
- Kodi – the GPL open source software that MediaPortal was originally based upon.
- Comparison of PVR software packages
- Microsoft PlaysForSure
- 2Wire MediaPortal
- List of codecs
- List of free television software
