= RVU protocol =

Remote user interface protocol

The RVU protocol (RVU, a pseudo-acronym pronounced "R-view") is an Application Layer protocol, that combines the pre-existing Digital Living Network Alliance (DLNA) standards and a new Remote User Interface (RUI) protocol, which works similar to Remote Desktop Protocol (RDP). The RVU RUI protocol is intended to allow an RVU-enabled client, such as a TV, to receive a pixel-accurate display of the user interface available on an RVU server.

RVU, combined with DLNA's ability to transmit media (video, photos and music) across a home network, allows for the entire user experience of a media server to be transmitted to an RVU client, makes the user interface available via the RUI protocol while all processing is being done by the server software and plug-ins happen at the host computer; only the user interface is streamed to the client devices. The protocol is primarily intended to operate over a home network. The RVU protocol has been developed with a focus on passing broadcast video coming from a multichannel video programming distributor through a residential gateway or dedicated media server to other consumer electronic devices in the home. However the protocol has much broader applications than just this.

== Overview ==
The RVU Protocol was defined to solve the problem of how to provide a consistent television user interface throughout the home, without requiring the use of a dedicated set-top box for each television. The RVU Protocol is a communications protocol which runs on a media server device and multiple client devices. RVU uses open standards (including DLNA and UPnP) which are already in use in the consumer electronics field.

The clients can consist of various manufacturer-branded TVs, Blu-ray players or other client devices. The server generates the user guide and other data and sends this for the client to display. In this way the clients can be low complexity or "thin" client devices, while still providing a full user interface experience to the user. Once an RVU compliant device is connected to an RVU server, the TV viewer can watch the same or different content from any room of the home. Viewers can access the same prerecorded or live content from the server via the client device as if a set-top box were present, with the same user guide experience.

RVU supports networking on existing home infrastructure, but is agnostic to the transport mechanism and can work on Wireless technologies such as 802.11 or wired technologies such as Ethernet or MoCA.

RVU supports a Remote User Interface (RUI) that allows user interactions such as trick play (e.g., pause and rewind) and the running of interactive applications.

As such, the device can render the interface even though the media center specific software (or the plug-ins) might not be installed there. However, the media files are streamed over a different protocol. To render the media, the Extender needs to have an implementation of the codec used to package the media locally installed on the client which works as an extender; having the codec on the host computer is not enough. Alternatively media can be trans-coded on the fly by the host computer to a codec that is supported by the client.

== History ==
The RVU Protocol specification V1.0 was released on 3 December 2009.

== Specification ==
The RVU Protocol specification V1.0 is currently ratified by the board and available to members for implementation.

The RVU protocol specification V2.0 became available on January 7, 2013.

The specification is in large part dependent on the DLNA specification.

The specification uses DTCP/IP as "link protection" for copyright-protected commercial content between one device to another.

== Certification ==
RVU certification Devices are subject to certification by the Consumer Technology Association.

== See also ==
- AllVid - FCC effort to create an industry wide mandated standard similar to RVU
- Media Center Extenders (MCX) software makes the user interface available via the RDP protocol, all processing done by the MCE software and plug-ins happen at the host computer; only the user interface is streamed to the MCX devices (officially "Extender for Windows Media Center")
