= Windows Media Center =

Media center application created by Microsoft

- Windows Media Center screenshots
- Developer: Microsoft
- Operating system: Included with: Windows XP Media Center Edition; Windows Vista (Home Premium and Ultimate editions); Windows 7 (Home Premium, Professional, Ultimate and Enterprise editions); Xbox (Media Center Extender Version 1); Xbox 360 (Media Center Extender Version 2); Also available for: Windows 8 (Pro with Media Center only); Windows 8.1 (Pro with Media Center only)
- Type: Media center application and digital video recorder
- Website: Last archive.org copy of defunct full site; Archive.org copy of support.microsoft.com article

Windows Media Center (WMC) is a discontinued media center application and digital video recorder software published by Microsoft. Media Center was first introduced to Windows in 2002 on Windows XP Media Center Edition (MCE). It is included in the Home Premium and Ultimate editions of Windows Vista, as well as all editions of Windows 7 except Starter and Home Basic. It was also available on Windows 8 Pro and Windows 8.1 Pro as a paid add-on. It was discontinued as of Windows 10 and the operating system also removes all of Windows Media Center during an upgrade from previous versions of Windows, although it can reportedly be unofficially reinstalled using a series of Command Prompt commands.

Media Center's main feature is viewing and recording TV content on a PC thanks to its support for TV tuner hardware and an Electronic program guide. TV tuner hardware support was introduced in Windows with the Broadcast Driver Architecture in Windows 98, and evolved over time to add support for digital and HD broadcasts and newer terrestrial, cable and satellite television standards. Media Center as a built-in DVR software did not appear until Windows XP Media Center Edition.

Media Center can play slideshows, videos and music from local hard drives, optical drives and network locations. Users can stream television programs and films through selected services such as Netflix. Content can be played back on computer monitors or on television sets through the use of devices called Windows Media Center Extenders. It is also possible to watch and pause live TV. Up to six TV tuners on a tuner card are supported simultaneously. Both standard- and high-definition unencrypted video are supported through DVB-T and ATSC standards. It is possible to view encrypted cable television channels by using an internal or external tuner that supported CableCARD.

Shortly after Windows 7's 2009 release, Microsoft disbanded the Media Center development team, thus abandoning any further software developments. Consequently, the Media Center interface remained unchanged for Windows 8 and 8.1 users. In May 2015, Microsoft announced that Windows Media Center would be discontinued on Windows 10, and that it would be removed when upgrading; but stated that those upgrading from a version of Windows that included the Media Center application would receive the paid Windows DVD Player app for free to maintain DVD playback functionality.

== Features ==
Windows Media Center uses TV tuner devices to play back and record TV shows from standard antenna, cable or satellite signals. Users can record television programs manually or schedule recording via the electronic program guide. Recordings can be burned to Video DVD or, barring copy restrictions, be transferred to a portable media player. Media Center supports both analog and digital tuners and allows up to six of each tuner type (analog, digital terrestrial, Clear QAM, CableCard) to be configured. All the tuners use the same guide data but it can be edited and configured to include additional channels such as Clear QAM not found or included in most Titan Guides. While playing live television, the program keeps a buffer that allows users to rewind or pause live TV and skip commercials. A third party program MCEBuddy allows automatic commercial skipping on recorded programs.

Media Center can stream both live and recorded contents to Windows Media Center Extenders such as the Xbox 360 console, but other Windows computers can just access recorded content. Playback of content on television is possible through Media Center Extenders or by directly connecting a computer running Windows Media Center to a television. The menus of Windows Media Center are displayed in a 10-foot user interface suitable for viewing on large screen televisions and can be navigated using various remote controls. Windows Media Center PCs require a sensor to be able to interact with the remote control. To advertise Media Center support, remote controls must also have certain buttons such as the Green Media Center logo Start button and buttons for navigation, playback and volume controls, power and channel flipping.

=== Media file support ===
Windows Media Center organizes and displays videos and music found on both local and networked computers. Music albums are arranged with accompanying album art that can be downloaded off the Internet automatically or added manually into Media Center. Users can create playlists of different songs or albums as well. While playing music, the user can pause and fast forward songs and view visualizations. Analog FM radio support is also available if the user's TV tuner supports it.

Media Center allows users to browse pictures and play them in slideshows, as well as play video files. Media can be categorized by name, date, tags, and other file attributes. In addition, users can organize and play films through the "Movie Library" feature introduced in Windows Vista Media Center. Through the "Internet TV" feature, users can also stream television and web shows from select content providers.

=== CableCARD support ===
Windows Vista Media Center introduced support for CableCARD devices. However, CableCARD was only supported on OEM hardware that had been certified by CableLabs. Windows 7 Media Center supports adding CableCARD to existing hardware, provided the hardware meets certain requirements. Shortly after the release of Windows 7, Microsoft released the Digital Cable Advisor tool to verify that the requirements are met before activating CableCARD support.

=== Portable devices ===
Windows Media Center allows synchronization with certain portable devices. These devices include Windows Mobile Pocket PCs, smartphones, Portable Media Centers and other players that can sync with Windows Media Player. Microsoft's Zune cannot use the sync function, but can play Media Center recorder TV files when they are copied to a Zune monitored folder.

While synchronizing television shows, Windows Media Center encodes the shows using Windows Media Encoder to a Windows Media Video format at a lower quality than the original format used for viewing on the desktop media center. This is to complement the limited storage space and processing power of such portable devices. Optionally, music can also be re-encoded to a smaller file size upon synchronization.

== Version history ==
=== Windows XP Media Center Edition ===
Windows Media Center, codenamed "Freestyle", is first included with Windows XP Media Center Edition.

=== Windows Vista ===
A new version of Windows Media Center included in the Home Premium and Ultimate Windows Vista editions. The user interface was redesigned and tailored for the 16:9 aspect ratio. Support for multiple tuners was added in later releases and varies depending upon the version of the operating system purchased. Support for many Windows Media Center Extender hardware devices, that had been released pre-Vista, was also dropped leaving many owners out of luck if they did not upgrade to one of the supported Windows Vista versions from the Windows XP Media Center Edition. Also introduced to U.S. users was Internet TV, which allows access to streaming content through WMC. It also allows video game content.

Each button in the main menu, which contains sections such as "Music", "Videos", and "TV", gets encased in a box when selected, and for each selection, a submenu comes up, extending horizontally. When any of the options is selected, the entries for each are presented in a grid-like structure, with each item being identified by album art, if it is an audio file, or a thumbnail image if it is a picture, a video or a TV recording, and other related options, such as different views for the music collection if "Music" is selected, extend horizontally along the top of the grid. Similarly, other items are identified by suggestive artwork. The grid displaying the items is also extended horizontally, and the selected item is enlarged compared to the rest.

Other features of Windows Media Center include:

- Support for two dual-tuner cards.
- Native DVD/MPEG-2 support.
- Addition of Movies and DVD button which lists all the movies on the hard drive and DVD.
- Tasks button that provides access to jobs such as setting up and configuring a media center extender device.
- Any video playing is overlaid on the background of the user interface, if the UI is navigated while the video is still playing.
- Support for high-definition (HD) content, and CableCARD support.
- Uses the .NET 2.0 CLR.

Microsoft later updated Windows Media Center with a feature pack known as TV Pack 2008. This release, codenamed "Fiji", was only made available via OEMs for new computers that came preinstalled with the update. It is not available as an update for existing WMC users. The update tweaked the user interface, added support for digital subchannels, QAM, DVB-S and MHEG, and increased the total number of each type of tuner allowed. It used .wtv files instead of .dvr-ms. Beta versions also supported H.264 format but this feature was removed upon release to manufacturing.

=== Windows 7 ===
An updated version of Windows Media Center is included in all the Windows 7 editions except Starter and Home Basic. Much of the functionality added with TV Pack 2008 is included with the version of Media Center included in Windows 7, along with an update to the user interface.

Windows Media Center has retained much of the design and feel of its predecessor, but with a variety of user interface shortcuts and browsing capabilities. Playback of H.264 video both locally and through a Media Center Extender (including the Xbox 360) is supported.

Some notable enhancements in Windows Media Center include a new mini guide, a new scrub bar, the option to color code the guide by show type, and Internet content that is more tightly integrated with regular TV via the guide. All Windows 7 versions now support up to four tuners of each type (QAM, ATSC, CableCARD, NTSC, etc.).

When browsing the media library, items lacking album art are shown in a range of foreground and background color combinations instead of using white text on a blue background. When the left or right remote control buttons are held down to browse the library quickly, a two-letter prefix of the current album name is prominently shown as a visual aid. The Picture Library includes new slideshow capabilities, and individual pictures can be rated.

Also, while browsing a media library, a new column appears at the top named "Shared." This allows users to access shared media libraries on other Media Center PCs from directly within Media Center.

For television support, the Windows Media Center "TV Pack" released by Microsoft in 2008 is incorporated into Windows Media Center. This includes support for CableCARD and North American (ATSC) clear QAM tuners, as well as creating lists of favorite stations.

A gadget for Windows Media Center is also included in Windows 7.

The Public folder also contains a hidden Recorded TV library that appears in the Windows Explorer side pane when TV is set up in Media Center for the first time.

=== Windows 8 and 8.1 ===
Windows Media Center was not included with any of Windows 8 editions. Instead, it was part of a Windows 8 Media Center Pack add-on available only for retail versions Windows 8 Pro, and Windows 8 Pro Pack that upgrades Windows 8 to Windows 8 Pro available through the Add features to Windows 8 service. The Windows 8 Pro Pack was available for US$69.99, while the Windows 8 Media Center Pack was available at no charge from October 26, 2012, until January 31, 2013, as a promotion to encourage users to upgrade to Windows 8. After the promotion, the price of the Windows 8 and 8.1 Media Center Pack changed to US$9.99, until it was discontinued on October 30, 2015.

Windows Media Center cannot run on startup or on top of other windows because of "new Windows OS requirements and behaviors".

=== Windows 10 Technical Preview ===
On Windows 10 Technical Preview builds, adding Windows Media Center using a purchased Windows 8.1 product key will result in the system subsequently identifying itself as "Windows 8.1 Pro with Media Center", along with a warning that the OS has not been activated. The issue also prevented users from getting updates, patches and future preview builds.

== Application development ==
Windows Media Center was designed as a programmable platform; other programs can tie into the Media Center UI using the WMC API, which is provided as a managed API. The functionality of Windows Media Center can be extended by three different types of applications:

=== Presentation Layer Applications ===
These are managed applications written using the WMC API and packaged as CLI assemblies. Presentation Layer applications can have full access to both the .NET Framework as well as the Windows Media Center API, with the latter exposing a managed object model to access and manipulate the current states of the media management and playback, live television, video recording as well as the presentation capabilities of Windows Media Center. Presentation Layer applications are rendered using the bitmap-based Windows Media Center Presentation Layer, the user-input and presentation system of Windows Media Center. Presentation Layer includes support for animations, dynamic layout, keyboard/mouse as well as remote navigation. Presentation Layer applications can be streamed over RDP to Windows Media Center Extenders; so Presentation Layer applications run on the extenders without any modification. Presentation Layer, however, exists only in the Windows Vista version of Windows Media Center.

Presentation Layer applications are created using an XML-based declarative markup language, known as Media Center Markup Language (MCML). MCML is used to define the user interface, with animation, text input, navigation, data binding, and local storage support available from the markup itself. If custom code or other functionality is required to implement a certain feature, CLI assemblies can be referred. Any CLI language can be used to write the code-behind assemblies that implement the required functionality. An MCML document defines the interface as a collection of UI elements, each exposing four attributes: Content which defines what that UI element will display, Properties to control the presentation aspects of the element, Locals which enumerate the set of private state data for the element, and Rules which allow the attributes to be modified based on certain triggers. By modifying these attributes at runtime, either from markup or code behind classes, the interface is generated.

Presentation Layer applications can either be locally installed, or downloaded from the web as necessary. However, in the latter case, the code is untrusted; only the .NET classes that are marked as safe for use by Internet-originating code can be used. Before an application can be used, it has to be registered with Windows Media Center. An application can either register itself as a top-level menu item, in any of the sub-menus (depending on the type of application), as an autoplay handler, into the Program Library (the menu category for all programs), or as a background application without a user interface running as long as a Windows Media Center session continues.

=== XAML Browser Application ===
Windows Media Center can also act as host for XAML Browser Applications (XBAP), which are rendered in the user interface itself. XBAPs are rendered using the vector-based resolution-independent Windows Presentation Foundation component of .NET Framework 3.0. XBAPs have their UI written in XAML with code behind in any .NET language. XBAPs are also limited to Windows Vista. Windows Media Center provides limited support for streaming XBAPs to Windows Media Center Extenders. XBAPs have been declared deprecated in Windows Media Center SDK version 5.3.

=== Hosted HTML Applications ===
Windows Media Center can host Internet Explorer within its own UI (using WMC UI widgets) and can display web pages and web applications. This feature is supported in both Windows XP and Windows Vista. Web applications written specifically for being hosted in WMC can use a subset of the WMC API which is exposed via JavaScript. HTML applications are also not fully supported for streaming to extenders.

== Discontinuation ==
During the 2015 Build developers' conference, a Microsoft executive confirmed that Media Center, with its TV receiver and PVR functionality, would not be updated for or included with Windows 10; thus the product would be discontinued. Those upgrading to Windows 10 from a version of Windows that included the Media Center application would receive the paid Windows DVD Player app for free to maintain DVD playback functionality after the first Windows Update.

Some users who wanted Microsoft to provide an official port of the Windows Media Center for Windows 10 created two change.org petitions and sent thousands of requests to Microsoft via their Windows Feedback app included with Windows 10. Despite all efforts, only the community maintains apps and support for the feature.

=== Electronic Program Guide ===
In early July 2015, Microsoft announced that the Electronic Program Guide (EPG) for Windows Media Center was being updated on July 7, 2015 with new video data packages. This update to the EPG changed the service provider from Zap2It to Rovi. Since the update a large number of reports have been posted to the Microsoft Media Center Feedback page indicating that the EPG data feed from Rovi has significant data quality issues relating to incorrect channel lineups, outdated and incorrect program data and failure to download the EPG data from Rovi through Microsoft's servers. This update was not given to the early Insider Preview builds of Windows 10 even though they included the WMC.

=== Program Guide Data Service ===
Support for Electronic Program Guide service officially ended on January 14, 2020, coinciding with the end of support for Windows 7. This applies to all versions of WMC including users running WMC on discontinued products such as XP and Vista. Despite the announcement, EPG data continued to be updated until the first week of April 2020. Alternatives exist that acquire program information and load it into the WMC EPG data base. Some use fee-based subscription services to obtain the information. Some require multiple processing steps but are generally automatable.

Some alternate TV listing providers are:

- epg123 (free software that lets WMC get EPG data from other sources)
- WebGrab+Plus (standalone EPG software)
- SchedulesDirect (provides EPG data for software like EPG123, at a cost of $35 per year)
- EPG Collector (open-source software to insert over-the-air EPG data into Windows Media Center 7)

Some DVR-like alternatives to WMC that support Program Guide Data:

- Jellyfin – free and open source software, with Program Guide and IPTV support
- Emby DVR – cost $5 per month, $55 for 1 year or $119 for lifetime
- Plex – cost $5 per month, $39 for 1 year, or $119 for Lifetime
- SiliconDust Dvr – $35 per year
- JRiver – Windows license $60
- MediaPortal – unknown

== See also ==
- Kodi (a free, open-source, and cross-platform media center software)
- Comparison of DVR software packages
- MediaPortal
- Microsoft Mediaroom
- Personal video recorder
- XrossMediaBar
