= GB-PVR =

DVR software brand

- A screenshot of GB-PVR main menu (default theme)
- Stable release: 7.0.0.241105 / 2024-12-04 (as NextPVR)
- Operating system: Microsoft Windows; Linux macOS
- Type: Personal video recorder
- License: Proprietary (core)
- Website: https://www.nextpvr.com/

GB-PVR is a PVR (personal video recorder a.k.a. digital video recorder) application, running on Microsoft Windows, whose main function was scheduling TV recordings and playing back live TV. GB-PVR is no longer under active development and has been superseded by NextPVR, also known as nPVR.

GB-PVR also acts as a home media center application with a digital video recorder, a radio station online tuner, a music and movie player, a library of images and other features.

Although GB-PVR supports open interfaces, the core engine code is closed. However developing personal plug-ins is an option to extend the application and these can be closed or open source, depending on the developer's interests. These plug-ins can be developed in C#, VB.NET or C++ and some examples are available in the GB-PVR official Forums and the GB-PVR Documentation wiki websites. The software was developed with an interface which allows user to change the skin view or other graphic elements as the wallpaper.

GB-PVR is mostly an MPEG recording and playback system, but may also play other non-MPG content such as AVI (DivX/Xvid), WMV, and other formats that are supported by the codecs installed into a computer's.

It requires a supported TV tuner card, a VMR9 capable display adapter (video card), and a supported MPEG2 Decoder. Other requirements are listed on the GB-PVR web site.

== Features ==
- Integrated graphical user interface to manage all functionality
- 10-foot user interface for large screen displays
- TV Guide for scheduling of recordings
- Support for season recordings
- Support for automatically converting recordings to DivX/Xvid/WMV/iPod etc.
- Support for manual recordings on a specified channel at a specified time
- Timeshift television allowing for pausing live TV etc.
- Multidec support enabling the use of a wide range of softcams and other DVB plugins.
- Teletext
- DVB Subtitles
- Support for recording multiple digital channels at the same time with 1 tuner card when channels are on the same frequency
- SRT Subtitles
- Access to music, videos and photos inside the computer.
- Net radio
- FM radio
- Support for HDTV
- Multi-lingual support, with language packs available for many languages.

== NextPVR ==
NextPVR is the successor of GB-PVR 1.4.7 (August 29, 2009), and includes most features of GB-PVR, and others. As of 4 December 2024, it was at revision 7.0.0.241105.

== Supported capture cards ==
Capture or tuner cards are devices that allows a computer to record video signal, receive television signal and playback video. Some examples of capture cards are:

=== Analog TV cards ===
These capture cards are the most popular as they allow to receive television signals with a computer, moreover some of them also act as video capture, recording television programs in the computer. Some examples are:

- Hauppauge
- Adaptec
- ATI
- AVerMedia
- Conexant
- and more...

=== Digital TV cards ===
Depending on the type of device these cards can allow to tune the reception of digital signals as DVB-T and DVB-S, ATSC HDTV or QAM HDTV signals. These devices also can include BDA drivers. Some examples are listed below:

DVB-T AND DVB-S DEVICES

- Hauppauge
- Fusion HDTV
- ATI HDTV
- Kworld
- and more...

ATSC HDTV DEVICES

- Fusion HDTV
- Hauppauge
- AverMedia
- SiliconDust

QAM HDTV DEVICES

- OnAir GT
- SiliconDust HDHomeRun
- Hauppauge HVR-1600
- Hauppauge HVR-1800

GO7007SB BASED DEVICES

- Generic Conexant “Blackbird” based card
- Plextor PX-M402U, PX-TV402U
- Lifeview TV Walker

== Remote control ==
IR or RF signal transmitters and receivers are used for GB-PVR remote control. Software makes the interpretation of the signals. With few buttons the user can interact with GB-PVR. Some manufacturers have developed remotes for remote PC wake up.

== Playback ==
- Playback of many video formats, MPEG, AVI, DivX, Xvid, TS, etc.
- Extensible playback mechanism allowing additional file types to be added with correct codecs installed
- Automatic aspect ratio control
- DVD playback from either DVD drive or DVD image on hard disk.
- Supports VMR9/VMR7/Overlay video renderers
- VMR9 full screen Exclusive mode
- Music visualizations.

== Plug-ins ==
Plug-in DLLs go in the gbpvr/plugins directory, and plug-in skins in the skin directory. Usually plug-ins are distributed as zip files, and can be extracted to the gbpvr root directory. When there is a skin which is not available in the plug-ins zip file, it has to be copied into the current skin directory.

Some plug-ins may be configured in the GB-PVR configuration tool, but most of them are configured by editing the plugins Manual/ Skin (skin.xml)

Available in version 1.3.7 (current version 1.3.11 to be confirmed)

- AnimeLibrary (Collection of Anime episodes, images...)
- BurnDVDX2 (DVD creator from MPGs)
- Cinema (Shows information of our local cinemas, time, films...)
- DVB-TRadio (Pluggin for playing DVB-T Radio channels)
- GameZone (Front-end for multiple emulators)
- GraphRecorder (Allow to use an external to record programs for GB-PVR)
- MLPanel (Design screen-savers, picture slide...)
- MovieWiz (Movie manager)
- Music (Fast database driven music player application with free text search and tag edit)
- SkinPlugin (Allows users to browse themes and change the look of GB-PVR on-the-fly.)
- SS2Recorder (Record and watch Live TV by TechniSat)
- Torrents (Torrent files manager using ‘uTorrent’)
- TVListings (TV guide)
- Weather (on demand weather channel)
- WebCams (Allows users to view webcams all around the world)

== Client/server support ==
When configuring the machine which is running GB-PVR, the possibilities are client and server mode. The server is responsible of recordings that the clients can schedule. Therefore, clients do not need a recording service. A client PC just can watch TV and recordings from the server, which has to share them. Clients can also use the EPG which runs in the server. There are two different sharing modes:

- Streaming (only supports MPEG2)
- File sharing

Other clients supported:

- Hauppauge MediaMVP
- NMT (Network Media Tank)

== See also ==
- Comparison of PVR software packages
- Digital video recorder
- Hard disk recorder
- Home theater PC (HTPC) - also known as "Media PC"
- Media center application
- Quiet PC
