= Windows XP Media Center Edition =

Microsoft Windows operating system released in 2001

- Windows XP Media Center Edition's desktop, when Media Center is not running. This edition uses Royale (Energy Blue) as its default theme.
- Developer: Microsoft
- OS family: Microsoft Windows
- Source model: Closed-source; Source-available (through Shared Source Initiative)
- Released to manufacturing: September 3, 2002; 24 years ago
- General availability: October 29, 2002; 23 years ago
- Latest release: 2005 Update Rollup 2 (5.1.2715.3011) / October 14, 2005; 21 years ago
- Kernel type: Hybrid kernel (Windows NT)
- Default user interface: Graphical user interface
- License: Proprietary commercial software
- Succeeded by: Windows Vista, Windows 7 (only Home Premium and Ultimate included Media Center)
- Official website: microsoft.com/windowsxp/mediacenter (Archive site)

Support status
- Mainstream support ended on April 14, 2009; Extended support ended on April 8, 2014

Windows XP Media Center Edition (MCE) is a version of the Windows XP operating system developed by Microsoft designed to serve as a home-entertainment hub for personal computers. It was the first version of Windows to include Windows Media Center. The last version, Windows XP Media Center Edition 2005 Update Rollup 2, was released on October 14, 2005. After that, Windows Media Center was included in certain editions of later Windows versions. It was an optional, paid addition to Windows 8 and then dropped from Windows 10. Windows XP Media Center Edition reached end of support on April 8, 2014, along with most other Windows XP editions.

== Versions ==
Windows XP Media Center Edition has had the following releases, all based on Windows XP Professional with all features enabled except domain-joining ability disabled in Windows XP Media Center Edition 2005 and Terminal Services in the original release.

- A preview version of Windows XP Media Center Edition from Microsoft's eHome division, was shown at CES 2002, with the final version released later that year.
- Windows XP Media Center Edition (codenamed "Freestyle") was the original version of Windows XP Media Center, which was built from the Windows XP Service Pack 1 codebase. It was first announced on July 16, 2002, released to manufacturing on September 3, 2002, and was first generally available on October 29, 2002, in North America.
- Windows XP Media Center Edition 2004 (codenamed "Harmony"), which was launched on September 30, 2003, and was made available as an upgrade to the owners of the original editions' licenses, was built from the Windows XP Service Pack 1 codebase, after the original Windows XP Media Center Edition.
- Windows XP Media Center Edition 2005 (codenamed "Symphony"), which was launched on October 12, 2004, was built from the Windows XP Service Pack 2 codebase. It is the first edition of MCE available to non-Tier 1 system builders. Among other things, it includes support for Media Center Extenders, and CD/DVD-Video burning support.
- Windows XP Media Center Edition 2005 Update Rollup 2 (codenamed "Emerald", October 14, 2005) is a major update to MCE 2005 (Symphony) and was a recommended download. It adds support for the Xbox 360 as a media center extender, DVB-T broadcasts, and support for two ATSC tuner cards. It is the second version of Windows XP Media Center based on Windows XP Service Pack 2, after Windows XP Media Center Edition 2005.

== Exclusive features ==
Windows XP Media Center Edition is distinguished with its exclusive component, Media Center, a media player that supports watching and recording TV programs, as well as playing DVD-Video, photo slideshows, and music. Media Center sports a user interface that is optimized for use from a distance with large fonts and icons.

Unlike competing commercial DVR products, Microsoft did not charge a monthly subscription fee for its Media Center TV guide service.

Due to its strict hardware requirements, Microsoft opted not to supply Media Center as an independent retail version. Microsoft only distributed it to MSDN subscribers and original equipment manufacturers in certain countries. Consumers purchase Media Center preinstalled on a new computer, set-top box or embedded device.

== Windows XP Media Center Edition 2005 ==
=== New features ===
Screenshot of Windows Media Center, the exclusive component of Windows XP Media Center Edition

- Away Mode in Update Rollup 2 allows the machine to appear off while it performs background tasks.
- Windows Movie Maker, contains new effects and transitions and support for DVD burning based on Sonic Solutions's AuthorScript technology.
- Windows Media Player, upgraded to version 10, along with Windows Media Format Runtime 9.5.
- Royale theme: not included in other editions of Windows XP except Windows XP Tablet PC Edition, it is included and enabled by default.
- Microsoft Plus! Digital Media Edition components: a number of applications not included in previous versions of MCE are now included such as Audio Converter, CD Label Maker, Dancer and Party Mode.
- SoundSpectrum's G-Force: a special edition is included as one of the music visualizations for Windows Media Player.
- Screensavers and themes from Microsoft Plus! for Windows XP are included (Aquarium, Da Vinci, Nature, Space and My Pictures Premium).
- Media Center Extender Support, dedicated hardware devices that allow users to view the same content that is available on the MCE computer over wired or wireless Ethernet, are introduced in this version for the first time. Linksys and other companies currently sell Media Center Extenders, and Microsoft sells an add-on kit for the Xbox game console that allows it to function as an extender. The Xbox 360 also has Media Center Extender functionality out of the box, including HDTV support (which is notably absent from current extenders). Media Center 2005 currently can support up to 5 Media Center Extenders per household.
- First party hardware: Microsoft has released its own first party remote, receiver and infrared blaster with MCE 2005. A new specially designed wireless computer keyboard for MCE 2005 was released September 2005.

=== Removed features ===
- Joining a Windows Server domain: The ability to join an Active Directory domain is disabled by default. Computers that upgrade to Windows Media Center from a version of Windows that had joined the domain before upgrade will remain joined to the domain. However, if they leave the domain, they may never re-join. The option to join a domain during installation of this version of Windows is still available. Microsoft says that the reason for this discontinuation of feature is to support Media Center Extenders which required Fast User Switching. Users discovered that a registry edit could bypass the change and re-enable joining a domain.
- Windows Media Player 6.4, which was hidden in most Windows XP editions and came shipped with Windows 2000 and can be installed on Windows 95, Windows NT 4.0 and Windows 98, was removed. The MCI version of Media Player, Media Player 5.1, also hidden in Windows XP, remains.

== Hardware requirements ==
The Software Version screen showing MCE running on an Intel Core 2 Duo computer

Media Center has higher hardware requirements than other editions of Windows XP. MCE 2005 requires at least a 1.6 GHz processor, DirectX 9.0 hardware-accelerated GPU (ATI Radeon 9 series or nVidia GeForce FX Series or higher), and 256 MB of System RAM. Some functionality, such as Media Center Extender support, use of multiple tuners, or HDTV playback/recording carries higher system requirements.

Media Center is much more restricted in the range of hardware that it supports than most other software DVR solutions. Media Center tuners must have a standardized driver interface, and they must have hardware MPEG-2 encoders (this was changed as companies such as ATI wrote drivers to support MCE 2005 with their All-In-Wonder cards and HDTV Wonder cards), closed caption support, and a number of other features. Media Center remote controls are standardized in terms of button labels and functionality, and, to a degree, general layout.

== Upgradeability ==
Windows XP Media Center Edition could be directly upgraded to Windows Vista Home Premium or Windows Vista Ultimate.

== Post-release support ==
Support for Windows XP Media Center Edition under Microsoft's consumer product lifecycle policy was planned to end on April 13, 2010, however, in July 2009, Microsoft extended the support window to July 12, 2011. This date would be then extended again on December 31, 2010 to a final end of support date of April 8, 2014, citing support volumes in emerging markets as the reason for the extension.

Windows XP Media Center Edition retail availability ended as planned on April 14, 2009.

== See also ==
- MediaPortal
- SageTV
- Windows Media Connect
- Media PC
- Kodi
- Portable Media Center
- Microsoft codenames
