= Windows Media Center Extender =

Windows Media Center Extenders (officially "Extender for Windows Media Center" and code named "Bobsled") are devices that are configured to connect over a computer network to a computer that includes Windows Media Center running Microsoft Windows XP Media Center Edition, Windows Vista Home Premium/Ultimate, Windows 7 Home Premium, or Windows 8 with a Pro pack to stream the computer's Windows Media Center software to the Extender device. This allows use of Windows Media Center and its features (such as view photos, videos, listen to music, watch live television and use DVR functions, watch recorded TV, etc.) on a television receiver or other electronic visual display.

The advantage with these devices is that a household's primary computer, hosting Windows Media Center, need not be near the device used for display. Additionally, with an Extender, Windows Media Center can be accessed at the same time by several users. The Xbox and Xbox 360 gaming consoles have Windows Media Center Extender functionality. The Ceton Echo is a stand-alone extender.

== Technology ==
Windows Media Center Extenders (MCX) can either be dedicated hardware devices, such as set top boxes or televisions, or software based implementations such as the Xbox 360. First generation hardware based devices were based on the Windows CE operating system whereas the second generation devices can use other embedded OSs such as Linux as well. The Extender creates its own user account on the host PC(MCX1, MCX2, etc.) and then uses a version of Fast User Switching to enable the use of the host computer and Extenders at the same time.

Version 1 Extenders only support Windows Media Center versions up to Windows XP Media Center Edition 2005 Update Rollup 2 - they cannot support the version of Windows Media Center incorporated in Windows Vista Home Premium/Ultimate Edition and later.

The server software, which runs on the host PC and streams the media, is built into Windows Media Center. An MCX device must be paired with the MCE software before use; this is done by pairing the MCE software with an identifying number generated by the MCX device.

The MCE software makes the user interface available via the Remote Desktop Protocol (RDP, which is also used by Remote Desktop client). All processing done by the MCE software and plug-ins happen at the host computer; only the user interface is streamed to the MCX devices.

As such, the device can render the interface even though the Windows Media Center-specific software (or the plug-ins) might not be installed there. However, the media files are streamed over a different protocol. To render the media, an implementation of the codec used to package the media must be locally installed on the Extender; having the codec on the host computer is not enough. Alternatively media can be trans-coded on the fly by the host computer to a codec that is supported by the Extender. In Windows 7 this is now a standard feature which will probably relieve Extender vendors in the future from having to include such a wide variety of codecs.

== Version 1 Extenders ==
- HP x5400
- Linksys WMCE54AG
- Xbox with Windows Media Center Extender Add-On

All Version 1 Extenders have been discontinued and are only supported with Windows XP, and are not compatible with Windows Vista or Windows 7.

== Version 2 Extenders ==
For quite some time, the Xbox 360 was the only Version 2 Extender available that could work with Windows Vista and Windows 7. When connecting an Xbox 360 to a Windows XP Media Center Edition PC, a free download is required to connect for the first time. When connecting an Xbox 360 to Windows Vista or Windows 7, no download is necessary as all required PC components are built into Windows Vista and Windows 7.

Microsoft eventually announced the v2 Windows Media Center Extenders from partners (Linksys, D-Link and Niveus Media) on 5 September 2007. Version 2 capable Extenders support animated transitions between screens and additional capabilities of Windows Vista to handle newer video formats, notably, DivX, Xvid, Windows Media Video HD and H.264. They can stream HDTV (including 1080p) through HDMI like the Xbox 360, can stream protected content and many incorporate draft 802.11n wireless connectivity.

In addition to these updates, manufacturers were able to also integrate the Extender software as an application into devices such as DVD players. Windows Media Connect and Windows Media Player Network Sharing are able to connect to them on Windows XP; however, they do not work with Windows XP Media Center Edition 2005 as extenders. Xbox 360 is the only device that can work as an extender with both Windows XP Media Center as well as Windows Vista.

As of 2020, there are no commercially available Extenders. The following devices support Windows Media Center Extenders:

- Xbox 360
- D-Link DSM-750
- HP MediaSmart Connect - x280n
- HP MediaSmart HDTV (With software update from April 2008)
- Linksys DMA2100
- Linksys DMA2200 (Integrated DVD Player)
- Niveus Media Extender Edge; is a modified Xbox 360 built into a different case.
- Samsung MediaLive Digital Media Extender MR-00EA1
- Ceton Echo (Does not work with Windows 8 Media Center)

=== Energy usage ===
The various versions of the Xbox 360 consume between 70 and 200 watts of power, depending upon model and activity (the 360 S consumes 70 W while idling). The Ceton Echo claims to use less than 5 W. Energy cost depends upon electricity prices, model, and use, but for an Xbox 360 running continuously can be a significant fraction of the purchase price every year. The Ceton claims to save up to US$60 a year on electricity compared to a cable box or Xbox 360 used as an extender.

== See also ==
- Windows Media Center
- Windows Media Connect
