= List of UPnP AV media servers and clients =

This is a list of UPnP AV media servers and client application or hard appliances.

== UPnP AV media servers ==
=== Cross-platform ===
- Allonis myServer, a multi-faceted media player/organizer with a DLNA/UPnP server, controller, and renderer, including conversion. Runs on Microsoft Windows. Supports most all HTML5 devices as remote controls.
- Asset UPnP (DLNA compatible) from Illustrate. An audio specific UPnP/DLNA server for Windows, QNAP, macOS and Linux. Features audio WAVE/LPCM transcoding from a range of audio codecs, ReplayGain and playlists.
- FreeMi UPnP Media Server, very simple server, historically used to stream to the STB Freebox, based on .net/mono.
- Home Media Server, a free media server/player/controller for Windows, Linux, macOS, individual device settings, transcoding, external and internal subtitles, restricted device access to folders, uploading files, Internet-Radio, Internet-Television, Digital Video Broadcasting (DVB), DMR-control and "Play To", Music (Visualization), Photo (Slideshow), support for 3D-subtitles, support for BitTorrent files, Web-navigation with HTML5 player, Digital Media Renderer (DMR) emulation for AirPlay and Google Cast devices.
- Jellyfin, a free and open-source suite of multimedia applications designed to organize, manage, and share digital media files to networked devices.
- JRiver Media Center, a multi-faceted media player/organizer with a DLNA/UPnP server, controller, and renderer, including conversion. Supports Microsoft Windows, macOS and Linux.
- Kodi (previously XBMC), a cross platform open source software media-player/media center for Android, Apple TV, Linux, macOS and Windows.
- LimboMedia, a free cross platform home- and UPnP/DLNA mediaserver with android app and WebM transcoding for browser playback (build with java and FFmpeg).
- MinimServer, a Java-based highly configurable uPnP/DNLA music server with additional consideration given to Classical Music, supports transcoding with MinimStreamer, supports Microsoft Windows, macOS, Linux, and various NAS devices.
- Neutron Music Player, acts as a cross platform UPnP/DLNA Media Renderer server available for Android, iOS, BlackBerry 10 & PlayBook platforms. Supports gapless playback and has possibility to output rendered audio further to the high-resolution internal DAC or external USB DAC or another UPnP/DLNA Media Renderer with all supported DSP effects applied.
- Plex, a cross-platform and closed source software media player and entertainment hub for digital media, available for macOS, Microsoft Windows, Linux, as well as mobile clients for iOS (including Apple TV (2nd generation) onwards), Android, Windows Phone, and many devices such as Xbox. Supports on-the-fly transcoding of video and music.
- PonoMusic World. Based on the JRiver Media Center software, includes similar features along with a store for purchasing HD audio tracks.
- PS3 Media Server, a free cross platform Java based UPnP DLNA server especially good for AVC and other current HD media codecs with on-the-fly transcoding.
- Serviio, is available with a free and a pro license. It can stream media files (music, video or images) to renderer devices (e.g. a TV set, Blu-ray player, games console or mobile phone) on a local area network.
- TVMOBiLi, a cross platform, high performance UPnP/DLNA Media Server for Windows, macOS and Linux.
- TwonkyMedia server, a cross-platform multimedia server and entertainment hub for digital media, available for Android, Apple TV, iOS, Linux, macOS, Microsoft Windows, Windows Phone, and Xbox 360.
- Universal Media Server, a free (open source) DLNA-compliant UPnP Media Server for Windows, macOS and Linux (originally based on the PS3 Media Server). It is able to stream videos, audio and images to any DLNA-capable device. It contains more features than most paid UPnP/DLNA Media Servers. It streams to many devices including TVs (Samsung, Sony, Panasonic, LG, Philips and more.), PS3, Xbox(One/360), smartphones, Blu-ray players and more.
- vGet Cast, a simple, cross platform (Chrome App) DLNA server and controller for single, local video files.
- Vuze, an open-source Java-based BitTorrent client which contains MediaServer plugin.
- Wild Media Server, a media server/player/controller for Windows, Linux, macOS, individual device settings, transcoding, external and internal subtitles, restricted device access to folders, uploading files, Internet-Radio, Internet-Television, Digital Video Broadcasting (DVB), DMR-control and "Play To", Music (Visualization), Photo (Slideshow), support for 3D-subtitles, support for BitTorrent files, Web-navigation with HTML5 player, Digital Media Renderer (DMR) emulation for AirPlay and Google Cast devices.

=== Android ===
- BubbleUPnP Android UPnP/DLNA server, player, controller and renderer
- CastLab Android UPnP/DLNA server.
- Pixel Media Server, Android UPnP/DLNA Media Server. Supports all popular Video and Audio files. It also support external subtitle file (SRT)
- Plato is an Android UPnP client app that can play videos and audio.
- Toaster Cast Android UPnP/DLNA server, controller and renderer
- vGet, Android App that can play videos embedded in websites on DLNA renderers.
- Media Cast UPnP, Android UPnP client app that can play videos/Audio.
- Media Server Pro is a DLNA server that allows individual file selections for sharing.
- Slick UPnP A minimal and intuitive open-source Android UPnP client app that can play video/audio. (It is not DMS)
- YAACC Open source UPnP controller, renderer and server app

=== Linux ===
Name	License	Description
GeeXboX	open source	lightweight media center for Linux that supports DLNA through uShare (uShare development is currently discontinued)
Mediatomb	open source	DLNA server for Linux. (no longer active)
Gerbera	open source	DLNA server based on Mediatomb
Moode		a music-centric DLNA server for Linux running on Raspberry Pi.
MythTV	open-source	HTPC and PVR software for Linux, with a built-in UPnP AV MediaServer.
ReadyMedia (formerly known as MiniDLNA)	open source	is a simple media server software, with the aim of being fully compliant with DLNA/UPnP-AV clients. It is developed by a Netgear employee for the ReadyNAS product line.
Rygel	open-source	media server part of the GNOME Live! project
Sundtek Streamingserver		a native Linux TV Server providing DVB, ATSC and ISDB-T, FM Radio, DAB+ via UPnP/DLNA, it also supports streaming media files (it only supports TV devices from Sundtek).
VortexBox	open source (GPL v3)	quick-install ISO that turns your unused computer into an easy-to-use music server/jukebox
upmpdcli	open source	An UPnP media renderer front end to MPD (Music Player Daemon) that also implements UPnP Media Server that can serve local media, Spotify, Tidal, or Deezer via plugins.

=== Microsoft Windows ===
- Sundtek Streamingserver a native Windows TV Server providing DVB, ATSC and ISDB-T via UPnP/DLNA, it also supports streaming media files (it only supports TV devices from Sundtek).
- Stream What You Hear, a Windows application that streams the sound of your computer (i.e.: “what you hear”) to UPnP/DLNA device such as TVs, amps, network receivers, game consoles, etc...
- TVersity Media Server, a Windows application that streams multimedia content from a personal computer to UPnP, DLNA and mobile devices (Chromecast is also supported). It was the first media server to offer real-time transcoding (back in 2005).
- TVersity Screen Server, a Windows application that mirrors the screen of a personal computer to UPnP, DLNA and mobile devices.
- DVBViewer, a Windows application, mainly for TV/Radio recording/playback, but with the ability to stream live TV/radio as well as multimedia files via UPnP/DLNA.
- DivX, a Windows application, mainly for video encoding into DivX format, but has the ability to stream multimedia files via DLNA.
- foobar2000, a freeware audio player for Windows. Highly customizable, audio only. Download of dlna-extension from the developers' webpage necessary.
- Home Media Center, a free and open source media server compatible with DLNA. Includes web interface for streaming content to web browser (Android, iOS, ...), subtitles integration and Windows desktop streaming. This server is easy to use.
- KooRaRoo Media, a commercial DLNA media server and organizer for Windows. Includes on-the-fly transcoding, per-file and per-folder parental controls, powerful organizing features with dynamic playlists, Internet radio streaming, "Play To" functionality and remote device control, burned-in and external subtitles, extensive format support including RAW photo formats. Streams all files to all devices.
- Media Go, media player and tagger
- MediaMonkey, a free media player/tagger/editor with an UPnP/DLNA client and server for Microsoft Windows
- MusicBee, an audio player, supports UPnP via a plugin.
- Mezzmo, a commercial software package. Mezzmo streams music, movies, photos and subtitles to the UPnP and DLNA-enabled devices. It automatically finds and organizes music, movies and photos, imports multimedia files from iPad, iPhone, iPod, Audio CDs, iTunes, Windows Media Player and WinAmp. DLNA server supports all popular media file formats with real time transcoding to meet the device specifications.
- PlayOn, a commercial UPnP/DLNA media server for Windows, includes a transcoder for streaming web video.
- TVble, a cloud connected (Rotten tomatoes/TMDB etc.), Torrent streaming, DLNA enabled media server. Allows single file or playlist downloads.
- Windows Media Connect from Microsoft, a free UPnP AV MediaServer and control point (server and client) for Microsoft Windows
  - WMC version 2.0 can be installed for usage with Windows Media Player version 10 for Windows XP
  - WMC version 3.0 can be installed for usage with WMP version 11 for Windows XP
  - WMC version 4.0 comes pre-installed on Windows Vista with its WMP version 11
  - WMC can also refer to Windows Media Center. From the Windows Media Center entry in Wikipedia: In May 2015, Microsoft announced that Windows Media Center would be discontinued on Windows 10, and that it would be uninstalled when upgrading; but stated that those upgrading from a version of Windows that included the Media Center application would receive the paid Windows DVD Player app to maintain DVD playback functionality, the main purpose for Media Center's use. This is stated on a Windows 10 FAQ page.

=== macOS ===
- Sundtek Streamingserver a native macOS TV Server providing DVB, ATSC and ISDB-T via UPnP/DLNA, it also supports streaming media files (it only supports TV devices from Sundtek).
- FireStream by Cyaneous, Inc., a commercial UPnP/DLNA media server for macOS with advanced transcoding capabilities, per-device profiles and native Mac media organization.
- ArkMS by Arkuda Digital, a full-featured UPnP/DLNA media server for macOS to stream video, music and pictures to UPnP/DLNA/Samsung Link compatible devices from Mac.

=== Hardware ===
- ASUS DSL-N55U ADSL Modem Router, supports USB drive media sharing. (Dual Band WIFI, 10/100/1000 Mbit/s)
- ASUS TUF AX3000 v2 WiFi Router, supports USB drive media sharing (iTunes and UPnP Windows Media Server USB applications).
- AVM FRITZ!Box, the newer revisions of these residential gateway devices come with a UPnP/DLNA compliant media server
- Billion 7800xxx series modem-routers come with a built in uPnP/DLNA compliant media server
- Buffalo WBMR-HP-G300H ADSL2+ Modem Router, supports USB drive media sharing, possible to install Open-/DD-WRT. Fast NAS sharing too. (Dual Band WIFI, 10/100/1000 Mbit's)
- Cambridge Audio AXN10 network streamer, supports DLNA UPnP media server features for attached USB drive
- Cambridge Audio CXN10 network streamer, supports DLNA UPnP media server features for attached USB drive
- Cambridge Audio MXN10 network streamer, supports DLNA UPnP media server features for attached USB drive
- D-Link DNS-323 2-Bay Network Attached Storage Enclosure.
- D-Link DNS-325 Share Centre]2-Bay Network Attached Storage Enclosure.
- Linksys WRT610N gigabit Wifi-N router supports UPnP with a USB hard drive, as a Storage feature
- MELCO N1 UPnP ripping server
- MikroTik RouterOS devices - UPnP server
- Naim NS01 ripping UPnP server and player
- Naim NS02 ripping UPnP server and player
- Naim NS03 ripping UPnP server and player
- Naim HDX ripping UPnP server and player
- Naim UnitiServe ripping UPnP server
- Naim Uniti Core - ripping UPnP server
- Naim Uniti Atom - All in one player with UPnP serving capability
- Naim Uniti Star - All in one player with ripping and UPnP serving capability
- Naim Uniti Nova - All in one player with UPnP serving capability
- Netgear ReadyNAS Includes ReadyDLNA (branded version of miniDLNA) on all ReadyNAS products and some routers as the ReadyShare USB feature.
- Noxon iRadio Series - UPnP player
- The Oppo BDP-103/105 model Blu-Ray Players and UDP-203/205 model UHD 4K Blu-Ray Players are Digital Media Renderers that have UPnP capabilities.
- PCEngine Alix and APU UPnP Media server based on ReadyMedia with EasyMPD
- Raspberry Pi 2 and 3 UPnP Media server based on ReadyMedia with EasyMPD
- SFR Neuf Cegetel NeufBox 5 (Gigabit LAN) and NeufBox 4 (10/100 Mbit/s with firmware 2.0.8) and USB drive key.
- All technicolor DSL/GPON Gateways from the TG712 upwards have an embedded DLNA certified Server (sharing content of a USB attached HDD).
- All Synology NAS are DLNA mediaserver and contain a web-based DLNA player which is also available as App for Android or iOS.
- Several Panasonic TV and Panasonic DVB-Receivers/Recorders are able to activate via menu the DLNA Server

==== See also ====
List of NAS manufacturers – there are many uncatalogued NAS devices with UPnP.

== UPnP AV clients ==
See also Digital Living Network Alliance#DLNA-certified software.

A UPnP client, also called a control point, functions as a digital audio/video remote control. Control points automatically detect UPnP servers on the network to browse content directories and request the transfer or streaming of media. A UPnP media renderer performs the actual audio or video rendering. Control points and media renderers most commonly run on separate devices, the control point being for example a tablet, and the renderer a television or a networked audio computer connected to an audio receiver. Some control points integrate a media renderer and may function as a complete music playing application.

=== UPnP control points and player software ===
==== Cross-platform ====
- Audionet RCP is an UPnP control point available for Windows and macOS
- Banshee, an open source (MIT) media player with UPnP-client support since version 2.4
- Kinsky is an open source UPnP control point for iPod/iPhone, iPad, Windows, macOS, Linux, Android and PocketPC.
- Kodi (XBMC#XBMCbuntu|XBMC), a cross platform open source software media-player/media center for Apple TV, Linux, macOS, Windows, Android and the custom XBMC#XBMCbuntu.
- Neutron Music Player, a cross platform UPnP/DLNA client which is able to read music files from UPnP/DLNA Media Server or send processed audio to UPnP/DLNA Media Renderer as an endless stream. Available for Android, iOS, BlackBerry 10 & PlayBook platforms.
- UPPlay, a desktop UPnP audio Control Point for Linux/Unix and MS Windows, is a light QT-based Control interface. It is free, open-source, and licensed under the GPL.
- Plex, a cross-platform and open source (GPL) software media player and a closed source media server and entertainment hub, available for macOS, Microsoft Windows, Linux, as well as mobile clients for iOS (including Apple TV (2nd generation) onwards), Android, and Windows Phone. The desktop version of the media player is free while the mobile version is chargeable.
- PlugPlayer is a cross-platform UPnP client, Media Renderer, Media Server and control point available for iPod/iPhone, iPad, Android, Google TV and macOS. In addition to UPnP servers, PlugPlayer can also utilize some cloud-based media services such as MP3tunes and CloudUPnP.
- VLC media player, a free, open-source and cross-platform media player that has a built-in UPnP-client that lets the user access the contents listed from an UPnP Media server. Though a very complete media player in itself, it does not provide any UPnP Control Point capabilities, nor can the player be controlled as a UPnP compliant Media Renderer. (For Windows, macOS, Linux, iOS & Android.)
- eezUPnP, a free software to play content from a media server on a client, has a built-in UPnP-client for music. (For Windows & Linux)
- MusPnP, an open source control point (For Windows, Linux, & macOS)

==== Android ====
- Audionet aMM is a UPnP/DLNA controller
- BubbleUPnP is a DLNA controller
- Bs.player is a free UPnP renderer/player
- Flipps (formerly iMediaShare) is a free DLNA compliant digital media controller, server and renderer
- Gizmoot is a free UPnP AV Control Point and Renderer
- MediaSteersman is a free UPnP control point for Android tablets with included UPnP renderer and server functionality
- Mezzmo is a UPnP/DLNA server, renderer and controller. There is a free trial version and a paid licensed version.
- Na Remote for UPNP/DLNA Android UPnP/DLNA controller
- Network Audio Remote is a free DLNA controller
- Onkyo Remote is a free UPnP renderer/player/server/controller
- Pixel Media Server is a free DLNA-compliant digital media server on Android platform. Has external subtitles support
- Pixel Media Controller is a free DLNA-compliant digital media controller on Android platform to control DLNA certified/compliant digital media server, digital media render and digital media printer on Android. Can browse contents from the media server and playback media at a DLNA-certified TV or renderer devices, and print at DLNA-certified printer
- Skifta (discontinued) - a DLNA-certified software app
- Toaster Cast Android UPnP/DLNA server, controller and renderer
- UPnP-AV Control Point is a free UPnP control point and renderer
- UPnPlay is a free UPnP renderer/player
- UPnP Monkey is a multi-room control point and DLNA media server which offers the opportunity to stream media from a smartphone or a network hard drive to a media player
- VidOn Player is a free DLNA compliant digital media controller, server and renderer
- YAACC is an open source UPnP/DLNA server, renderer and controller
- ZappoTV is a free DLNA compliant digital media controller, server and renderer
- Archos Video Player has DLNA rendering/player capabilities
- PlainUPnP (formerly DroidUPnP) is an open source DLNA controller
- Mbogi Music is an open source DLNA controller
- MediaMonkey for Android is a UPnP renderer and controller
- mconnect Player is a UPnP/DLNA Controller with free and paid version

==== BlackBerry ====
All devices running the BlackBerry 10 operating system include native UPnP media server capabilities.

- EnefceDMS is a free UPnP media server.

==== iOS ====
- AllShare TV - DLNA/UPnP Media Server for iOS with features to push and control media using iOS
- Audionet iMM UPnP control point
- Infuse DLNA/UPnP streaming client for iPhone and iPad
- nPlayer DLNA/UPnP Client for iPhone/iPad
- VidOn Player (HD) DLNA/UPnP Client for iPhone/iPad
- AirPlayer DLNA/UPnP Client for iPhone/iPad
- media:connect DLNA server, controller and renderer
- PlayerXtreme is a media playback and organizing solution
- 8player & Lite
- GoodPlayer
- Flipps (HD), formerly iMediaShare & iMediaShare Lite
- ZappoTV (HD) DLNA/UPnP Client for iPhone/iPad
- AcePlayer - player with downloading & background play features
- Creation 5 - UPnP control point app and client supporting both audio and video from a variety of sources
- mconnect Player is a UPnP/DLNA Controller with free and paid version
- Glider Music Player supports UPnP, OpenHome & Chromecast audio devices
- foobar2000 UPnP/DLNA Client (audio only), true gapless playback, ability to download a track/album from DLNA server for offline listening.
- JPLAY UPnP/DLNA Client (audio only), true gapless playback, combines Qobuz, Tidal, and local content in a single interface; https://jplay.app/
- nexTrack UPnP/DLNA Client (audio only), gapless playback. local content only for now. Tidal coming soon. https://getnextrack.com

==== Linux ====
- BRisa UPnP Framework, a free and open-source UPnP framework that allows the development of UPnP devices, as well as provides three implementation reference of UPnP applications: the BRisa Media server, the BRisa Media Renderer and the BRisa Control Point.
- djmount, free software to mount as a Linux filesystem the media content of compatible UPnP AV devices.
- Gnome Videos (Totem), a free and open-source Media Player part of the GNOME desktop, via the grilo plugin.
- upmpdcli, a free and open-source UPnP media renderer front end to MPD, the Music Player Daemon
- upplay, a free and open-source basic UPnP audio control point for the Unix Desktop, based on Qt.
- GUpnp-tools supplies a free and open-source GUI control point for AV devices, gupnp-av-cp.
- GMediaRender, a UPnP™ media renderer for POSIX®-compliant systems, such as Linux® or UNIX®. It implements the server component that provides UPnP controllers a means to render media content (audio, video and images) from a UPnP media server.
- GMRender-Resurrect, resource efficient UPnP/DLNA renderer, optimal for Raspberry Pi, CuBox or a general MediaServer. Fork of GMediaRenderer.
- Rhythmbox is an audio player with built-in UPnP/DLNA support, and can act as a UPnP client.
- JRiver Media Center, a media player/organizer with a DLNA/UPnP server, controller, and renderer, including conversion.

==== Microsoft Windows ====
- Windows Media Player, bundled with Microsoft Windows.
- foobar2000, an audio player, supports UPnP via a plugin.
- MusicBee, an audio player, supports UPnP via a plugin.
- AIMP, an audio player, supports UPnP via a plugin.
- Winamp, an audio player, supports UPnP via a plugin (ml_upnp.dll).
- WinDVD, is a commercial DVD-Video and video-files playback software for Windows.
- Nero MediaHome, a commercial software package containing both a UPnP client and server supporting music and video playback.
- MediaMonkey, free media player/tagger/editor with an UPnP/DLNA client and server.
- JRiver Media Center, a media player/organizer with a DLNA/UPnP server, controller, and renderer, including conversion.
- Wild Media Server, a media player/server with DLNA/UPnP capabilities.
- 5KPlayer, a mixture of free (MKV) UHD video player, music player, AirPlay & DLNA enabled media streamer and online downloader.

==== macOS ====
- MediaCloud Mac v2, UPnP Audio/Video Player & Control Point.
- Songbook Mac, UPnP Control Point.
- OPlayer, media player that has a built-in UPnP-client.
- JRiver Media Center, a media player/organizer with a DLNA/UPnP server, controller, and renderer, including conversion.
- AirBeamTV, a company who builds screen mirroring apps for Samsung, LG, Panasonic, Sony and Philips TVs based on the UPnP renderer in the TV, the Mac acts as the UPnP server as well as the UPnP control point.
- 5KPlayer, a mixture of free (MKV) UHD video player, music player, AirPlay & DLNA enabled media streamer and online downloader.

==== Symbian ====
- Nokia N80 has client and server.
- Nokia N82 has client and server, both DLNA certified.
- Nokia N95 has client and server, only the server is DLNA certified.
- Nokia N78 has client and server, both DLNA certified.
- Nokia E72, the first Nokia E-Series device having client and server, both DLNA certified.
- Nokia N97 has client and server, both DLNA certified.
- Nokia 5630 XpressMusic has client and server.
- Sony Ericsson Vivaz has server and is DLNA certified.
- Sony Ericsson Vivaz Pro has server and is DLNA certified.
- Samsung i8910 has server and is DLNA certified.

==== Windows Phone ====
- Linada
- Smart Player
- myMediaHub

==== Other ====
- GeeXboX, an open-source lightweight media center Live CD, no installation required
- Nokia N800 and its native MediaStreamer application. This client can also control other hardware renderers such as the Roku Soundbridge
- Nokia N900 through its Maemo 5 Operating System
- Moovida (formerly Elisa) is a free, open-source and cross-platform media center solution
- PlayStation 3 game-console with OS version 1.8 or later through the Xross Media Bar
- Xbox 360 client from Windows Media Connect
- OurJukebox client for Amazon Alexa

=== UPnP player/client hardware ===
- PlayStation 3 Sony games console from home screen
- PlayStation Vita Sony handheld games console from home screen
- Sony TVs, DVD/Blu-ray Player, Google TV Box and Network Media Players with DLNA certification
- Samsung smart TV
- Roku Media Player on Roku Players and smart TVs
- Panasonic Smart Viera TV
- Philips 4000, 5000, 6000, 7000, 8000 and 9000 LCD-LED series with DLNA interface
- Xbox One Microsoft games console with DLNA certification (After October 2014 Update)
- Xtreamer Digital Media Players

=== UPnP control point hardware ===
- Philips Streamium range of products
- Philips 8000 and 9000 LCD series with DLNA interface
- DIRECTV PLUS HD DVR hardware (HR20/HR21/HR21Pro/HR22/HR23)

=== UPnP media render hardware ===
- Arcam Solo Neo
- Archos Generation 5 All Archos models of the 5th Generation like 605 and 705
- Archos TV+ Like the 5th generation models
- Audionet DNA UPnP media player, DAC and integrated amplifier
- Audionet DNC UPnP media player and DAC
- Audionet DNP UPnP media player, DAC, preamplifier
- Blaupunkt IR-40+ FM/UKW/DAB+, Internet Radio, UPnP media player
- Boulder 1021 High Definition Multiple Format Audio Player
- Cambridge Audio CXN Network Player
- Cambridge Audio Stream Magic 6
- Cambridge Audio Stream Magic 6 V2
- Cambridge Audio Azur 851N
- Cambridge Audio Minx Xi
- Brite-View
- Denon ASD-3N
- Denon ASD-3W
- Denon ASD-51N
- Denon ASD-51W
- Denon CHR-F103
- Denon S-32
- Denon S-52
- Denon S-302
- Denon AVP-A1HDCI(A)
- Denon AVR-5308CI(A)
- Denon AVR-4810CI
- Denon AVR-4306
- Denon AVR-4308CI
- Denon AVR-4310CI
- Denon AVR-3310CI
- Denon AVR-990*
- Denon DNP-730AE (audio)
- Denon DNP-F109 (audio)
- Grundig Ovation 2i CDS 9000 WEB
- HP MediaSmart LCD High Definition Televisions
- HTC Media Link
- HTC Media Link HD
- Kathrein UFC960 - HDTV Cable Receiver
- Kodak EasyShare digital picture frames including at least the "W" series
- LG televisions and Blu-ray players that include the "Netcast" feature
- LG DP-1, DP-1W Digital Media Player
- Linn Klimax Exakt DSM
- Linn Klimax DSM
- Linn Klimax DS
- Linn Akurate DSM
- Linn Akurate DS
- Linn Akurate Renew DS
- Linn Majik DSM
- Linn Majik DS
- Linn Majik DS-I
- Linn Sekrit DSM
- Linn Sekrit DS-I
- Linn Sneaky DSM
- Linn Sneaky Music DS
- Linn Kiko DSM
- Linn Renew DS
- LOEWE. Art (SL210 / SL190 - 2013–2014)
- LOEWE. Art UHD (SL3xx 2014-20??)
- LOEWE. Connect ID (SL221 / SL212 - 2013–2014)
- LOEWE. Connect UHD (SL3xx 2014-20??)
- LOEWE. Individual Slim Frame (SL220 2012–2014)
- LOEWE. Reference ID (SL220 2012–2014)
- LOEWE. Reference UHD (SL3xx 2015-20??)
- Moon by Simaudio 180D MiND - Streamer supporting 192/24 streams and most major formats.
- Moon by Simaudio Neo 280D MiND - DAC with onboard streamer supporting 192/24 streams and most major formats including DSD.
- Moon by Simaudio Neo 380D MiND - DAC with onboard streamer supporting 192/24 streams and most major formats including DSD.
- Moon by Simaudio Evolution 780D - DAC with onboard streamer supporting 192/24 streams and most major formats including DSD.
- Netgear MP101
- Muvid ir815
- Musica Pristina Musica Pristina Transducer - Digital Music Player and DAC with tube output supporting 192/24 streams and most major formats.
- Musical Fidelity M1 Clic - High-End Digital Music Player and DAC that supports 192/24 streams and several formats.
- Med100X3D media player 3D - digital video and music player that supports 192/24
- Med600X3D media player3D - digital video and music player that supports 192/24
- Naim ND5 XS - Streamingplayer
- Naim NDX - Streamingplayer
- Naim NDS - Streamingplayer
- Naim UnitiQute - All-in-one player
- Naim UnitiLite - All-in-one player
- Naim NaimUniti2 - All-in-one player
- Naim SuperUniti - All-in-one player
- Naim Uniti Atom - All-in-one player
- Naim Uniti Star - All-in-one player
- Naim Uniti Nova - All-in-one player
- Naim ND5XS2 - Streamer
- Naim NDX2 - Streamer
- Naim ND555 - Streamer
- Olive OPUS music servers and players, Olive MELODY players
- Onkyo HT-RC180
- Onkyo PR-SC5507
- Onkyo R-N855
- Onkyo TX-NR609
- Onkyo TX-NR807
- Onkyo TX-NR905
- Onkyo TX-NR1007
- Onkyo TX-NR3007
- Onkyo TX-NR5007
- Onkyo TX-NR626
- Onkyo TX-NR808
- Oppo BDP-105
- Oppo BDP-103
- Panasonic Plasma Viera G30-Series
- Panasonic Plasma Viera NeoPDP G20-Series
- Panasonic Plasma Viera NeoPDP G15-Series
- Panasonic Plasma Viera NeoPDP V10-Series
- Panasonic Plasma Viera NeoPDP VT50-Series
- Panasonic Plasma Viera NeoPDP GT50-Series
- Panasonic Viera ST60 Series (2013, Plasma, DLNA Client)
- Panasonic Viera VT60 Series (2013, Plasma, DLNA Client)
- Panasonic Viera ZT60 Series (2013, Plasma, DLNA Client)
- Panasonic Plasma Viera NeoPDP Z1-Series
- PCEngines Alix (2d2, 3d2) and APU (APU1 and APU2) with EasyMPD
- Philips 4000, 5000, 6000, 7000, 8000 and 9000 LCD-LED series with DLNA interface
- PEAQ MUNET Link PMN400-B
- Pioneer KRP-500A
- Pioneer KRP-500ABG
- Pioneer KRP-500AW
- Pioneer KRP-600A
- Pioneer N-30
- Pioneer N-50
- Pioneer PDP-LX5090H
- Pioneer PDP-LX6090H
- Pioneer PDX-Z9
- Pioneer SC-LX71
- Pioneer SC-LX72
- Pioneer SC-LX81
- Pioneer SC-LX82
- Pioneer SC-LX83
- Pioneer SC-LX85
- Pioneer SC-LX86
- Pioneer SC-LX87
- Pioneer SC-LX90
- Plato Class A
- Plato Class B
- Plato Pre
- Plato Lite
- PS Audio PerfectWave DAC in combination with Bridge
- Pure Pure One Flow : FM, DAB, DAB+, UPnP/DLNA, Internet Radio
- Raumfeld Base
- Raumfeld Connector²
- Raumfeld Connector
- Raumfeld Controller
- Raumfeld One
- Raumfeld Speaker L
- Raumfeld Speaker M
- Raumfeld Speaker S
- Roberts Radio Stream 83i Radio
- Roberts Radio Revival iStream 3 Radio
- Roku SoundBridge and SoundBridge Radio (also sold under the Pinnacle Systems brand)
- Samsung UE40C8000
- Samsung UE46B7090
- Samsung UE60ES6300
- Sangean WFR-20 (also supports Windows Shares)
- Sonos all Sonos players (PLAY:1, PLAY:3, PLAY:5, Connect, Connect:AMP, PLAYBAR)
- Sony BD-S580
- Sony Network Speaker SA-NS310, SA-NS410, SA-NS510
- Sony Receiver STR-DN840, STR-DN1030, STR-DN1040
- Sony CMT-MX700NI Micro HIFI Component System
- TerraTec Noxon iRadio
- TerraTec Noxon M520
- WD TV Live Western Digital
- Xbox game-console with XBMC4Xbox (originally XBMC) software, which is a free open-source software multimedia-player.
- Xbox 360 game-console through the Xbox 360 Dashboard
- Yamaha RX-V3900
- Yamaha RX-Z7
- Yamaha YMC-700
- Yamaha RX-V2065
- Yamaha RX-Vx067 series (i.e. 1067, 2067, 3067)
- Yamaha RX-Vx73 series, beginning with RV-V473
- Yamaha RX-Vx75 series, beginning with RV-V475
- Yamaha Aventage Series (RX-A1000/A2000/A3000)
- Ziova ClearStream Series (i.e. CS510)

== See also ==
- Comparison of set-top boxes
- Comparison of UPnP AV media servers
- Digital Living Network Alliance
- Universal Plug and Play

=== Related technologies and network protocols ===
- DLNA
- Server Message Block
- Network File System
- File server
- Network-attached storage
- Storage area network
