= Comparison of UPnP AV media servers =

The following table compares the operating system support and basic features of various UPnP AV media servers.

Name	License	Cost	OS X	Unix-like	Windows	Audio	Images	Video	Transcoding	Web Interface	DLNA support	Multilingual (Note: For example, multilingual isn't supported if char 'Й' isn't displayed correctly on movie filename on the client device.)	Implementation	Subtitles (Note: For example, subtitles are not supported if they only work with few renderers.)	Still Supported	Misc.
360 Media Server	GPL	Free	No	Yes	Yes	Yes	No	No	Yes	Yes	Unknown	Unknown	Java	Unknown	No	
ALLMediaServer	GPL	Trialware	No	No	Yes	Yes	Yes	Yes	Yes	No	Yes	Yes	Delphi/Python	Yes	Yes	
ArkMS	Prop.	Non-free	Yes	No	No	Yes	Yes	Yes	No	Yes	Yes	Unknown	C++	Yes	Yes	
aVia Media Player	Prop.	Free	No	No	No	Yes	Yes	Yes	Yes	No	Yes	Unknown	Java	Unknown	Yes	
BRisa	MIT	Free	Partial (Note: Python or external packages are required.)	Partial	No	Yes	Yes	Yes	Yes (Note: Work in progress.)	Yes	Unknown	Unknown	Python	Unknown	Unknown	
Coherence	MIT	Free	Partial	Partial	Partial	Yes	Yes	Yes	Yes (Note: Audio: using gstreamer, Video: work in progress.)	Yes	Yes	Unknown	Python	Unknown	No	
DivX	Prop.	Free	Yes	No	Yes	Yes	Yes	Yes	Yes	No	Yes	Yes	C++	Unknown	Yes	
Elgato Eyeconnect	Prop.	Non-free	Yes	No	No	Yes	Yes	Yes	No	No	Unknown	Yes	Unknown	Unknown	No	
Foobar2000 (Note: With foo_upnp plugin.)	Prop.	Free	No	No	Yes	Yes	No	No	Yes	No	Unknown	Unknown	C++	Unknown	Yes	
FUPPES	GPL	Free	Yes	Yes	Yes	Yes	Yes	Yes	Yes	Yes	Partial	Unknown	C++	Unknown	No	
GeeXboX uShare	GPL	Free	No	Yes (Note: GeeXboX is provided as its own Linux distribution.)	No	Yes	Yes	Yes	No	Yes	Yes	Unknown	C	Unknown	No	
Gmediaserver	GPL	Free	No	Yes	No	Yes	No	Yes	No	No	Unknown	Unknown	C	Unknown	No	
Home Media Center	GPLv2	Free	No	No	Yes	Yes	Yes	Yes	Yes	Yes	Yes	Yes	.NET 4	Yes	Yes	
Home Media Server	Prop.	Free	Yes	Yes	Yes	Yes	Yes	Yes	Yes	Yes	Yes	Yes	Delphi	Yes	Yes	
iSedora Media Server	Prop.	Non-free	Yes	No	Yes	Yes	Yes	Yes	Yes	Yes	Yes	Unknown	Objective C / C++ / JavaScript	Unknown	Yes	
Jamcast	Prop.	Free	No	No	Yes	Yes	Yes	No	Yes	No	Yes	Unknown	C++ / C# / Java	Unknown	Yes	
JRiver Media Center	Prop.	Non-free	Yes	Yes	Yes	Yes	Yes	Yes	Yes	Yes	Yes	Yes	C++	Yes	Yes	
Kodi (formerly XBMC)	GPL	Free	Yes	Yes	Yes	Yes	Yes (Note: This feature is not in the latest stable release of XBMC but is available in the latest nightly releases.)	Yes	No	Yes	Yes	Yes	C++	Yes	Yes	
KooRaRoo Media	Prop.	Non-free	Yes	Yes	Yes	Yes	Yes	Yes	Yes	Yes	Yes	Yes	C++	Yes (Note: Supports streaming external subtitles (SRT, SMI, SUB), embedded subtitles and burning-in subtitles (including DVD graphical subtitles) on devices that don't support external subtitles.)	Yes	
LimboMedia	Prop.	Free	Yes	Yes	Yes	Yes	Yes	Yes	Yes	Yes	Yes	Yes	Java	Yes	Yes	
LXiMedia	GPL	Free	Yes	Yes	Yes	Yes	Yes	Yes	Yes, mandatory	Yes	Yes	Unknown	C++	Yes	No	
Majestic Media Server	Prop.	Non-free	Yes	No	No	Yes	Yes	Yes	Yes	No	Unknown	Unknown	Unknown	Unknown	Unknown	
MediaMonkey	Prop.	Non-free	No	No	Yes	Yes	No	Yes	Yes	No	Yes	Yes	Delphi	Yes	Yes	
MediaTomb	GPL	Free	Partial	Yes	No	Yes	Yes	Yes	Yes	Yes	Yes	Unknown	C++	Unknown	No	
Gerbera	GPL	Free	Yes	Yes	No	Yes	Yes	Yes	Yes	Yes	Yes	Unknown	C++	Unknown	Yes	Based on MediaTomb
ReadyMedia (formerly MiniDLNA)	GPL/BSD	Free	Partial	Yes	Yes	Yes	Yes	Yes	Partial	Partial	Yes	Unknown	C	Yes	Yes	
Mezzmo	Prop.	Free	No	No	Yes	Yes	Yes	Yes	Yes	Yes	Yes	Yes	C++	Yes	Yes	
myiHome	Prop.	Free	Yes	Yes	Yes	Yes	Yes	Yes	No	No	Unknown	Unknown	Java	Unknown	Unknown	
MythTV with uPnP	GPL	Free	Yes	Yes	No	Yes	Yes	Yes	Yes	Yes	Unknown	Unknown	C++	Unknown	Unknown	
Nullriver Medialink	Prop.	Non-free	Yes	No	No	Yes	Yes	Yes	Yes	No	Yes	Unknown	Unknown	Yes	Unknown	
PlayOn	Prop.	Non-free	No	No	Yes	Yes	Yes	Yes	Yes	Yes	Yes	Yes	C#	Partial (Note: Only on selected renderers, both embedded subtitles and external SRT.)	Unknown	
Plex	Prop.	Non-free (Note: Free version available with fewer features.)	Yes	Yes	Yes	Yes	Yes	Yes	Yes	Yes	Yes	Yes	C++ / Python	Yes	Yes	
PS3 Media Server	GPL	Free	Yes	Yes	Yes	Yes	Yes	Yes	Yes	Yes (Note: A WIP limited web interface for the optional media library exists in the latest betas.)	Yes	Yes	Java	Yes	No	
PyMedS	MIT	Free	Partial	Partial	No	Unknown	Unknown	Unknown	Yes (Note: Uses ffmpeg for video only.)	No	Unknown	Unknown	Python	Unknown	No	
Rygel	LGPLv2	Free	No	Yes	No	Yes	Yes	Yes	Yes	No	Yes	Yes	Vala	Unknown	Yes	
Rivet	Prop.	Free	Yes	No	No	Yes	Yes	Yes	No	No	Unknown	Unknown	Unknown	Unknown	No	
Serviio	Prop.	Non-free	Yes	Yes	Yes	Yes	Yes	Yes	Yes	Yes (Note: Via 3rd party add-ons.)	Yes	Yes	Java	Partial	Unknown	
SimpleCenter Premium	Prop.	Non-free	No	No	Yes	Yes	Yes	Yes	Yes	Yes	Unknown	Unknown	Unknown	Unknown	Unknown	
Skifta	Prop.	Free	Yes	Yes	Yes	Yes	Yes	Yes	No	No	Yes	Unknown	Java	Unknown	Unknown	
Songbird	GPLv2	Free	Yes	No	Yes	Yes	Yes	Yes	No	No	Yes	Yes	C++	No	No	
TVble	Prop.	Free	No	No	Yes	Yes	Yes	Yes	No	Yes	Yes	No	C#/C++	Unknown	Yes	
TVersity	Prop.	Non-free	No	No	Yes	Yes	Yes	Yes	Yes	Yes	Yes	Unknown	Unknown	Yes	Yes	
TVMOBiLi	Prop.	(Note: Streaming first 10GByte per month is free of charge.)	Yes	Yes	Yes	Yes	Yes	Yes	Yes	Yes	Yes	Partial	C++	Yes	No	
TVShare	Prop.	Non-free	No	No	Yes	Yes	Yes	Yes	Yes	No	Unknown	Unknown	Java	Unknown	Unknown	
TwonkyMedia server	Prop.	Non-free	Yes	Yes	Yes	Yes	Yes	Yes	Partial (Note: Transcoding supported in TMS 5.0 and later on the PC. Must download FFmpeg, VLC or other 3rd-party transcoding engines to use.)	Yes	Yes	Yes	Unknown	Unknown	Yes	
Universal Media Server	GPL	Free	Yes	Yes	Yes	Yes	Yes	Yes	Yes	Yes	Yes	Yes	Java	Yes	Yes	Based on PS3 Media Server
Windows Media Connect	Prop.	Free (Note: Must purchase a Microsoft Windows license to use.)	No	No	Yes	Yes	Yes	Yes	Yes	No	Yes	Yes	Unknown	Unknown	Yes	
Wild Media Server	Prop.	Trialware	Yes	Yes	Yes	Yes	Yes	Yes	Yes	Yes	Yes	Yes	Delphi	Yes	Yes	
xupnpd	GPLv2	Free	No	Yes	No	Yes	Unknown	Yes	No	Yes	Yes	Unknown	C++	Unknown	Unknown	
Yazsoft Playback	Prop.	Non-free	Yes	No	No	Yes	Yes	Yes	No	No	Unknown	Unknown	Unknown	Unknown	No	
Name	License	Cost	OS X	Unix-like	Windows	Audio	Images	Video	Transcoding	Web Interface	DLNA support	Multilingual	Implementation	Subtitles	Still Supported	

== See also ==
- List of UPnP AV media servers and clients
- Comparison of set-top boxes
- Universal Plug and Play
- Digital Living Network Alliance
