= Western Digital Media Center =

- Manufacturer: Western Digital

The Media Center, branded by Western Digital, is a 7,200-rpm hard drive (either 160GB or 250GB), combined with a reader of CompactFlash Type I and II, Microdrive, Memory Stick, Memory Stick Pro, MultiMediaCard, Secure Digital, and SmartMedia media. It can use either FireWire or USB to interface with a personal computer (Farrance, 2004).

Although branded as a Media Center this product is not a traditional media center and is nothing but a storage device and cannot actually play any media to a TV or Monitor. It must be plugged into a computer using the appropriate software to play any media.

== Current products ==
The product is now called WD TV, and supports Netflix, Pandora, and other services. The upgraded version, the WD TV Hub Live, supports Mediafly, Pandora, YouTube, Blockbuster, and Netflix. It comes with a 1 terabyte internal hard drive and can sync media using a "watched folders" paradigm from either a Mac or a PC. It does not support wi-fi natively, but this can be remedied by purchasing an adapter.

Seagate, Viewsonic and Iomega have similar media hard drives that can be plugged into a TV. They generally support Netflix, but few other services. The Roku has a USB port on one of its models, which can be used with an external hard drive.

The WD TV Hub Live does syncing, which makes it a DLNA-compliant media extender, as well as a hard drive and streaming device. The WD Live doesn't have this feature.

== See also ==
- Comparison of set-top boxes
