= Universal Media Server =

DLNA media server software

- Release: May 31, 2012
- Stable release: 15.8.1 / August 23, 2026; 31 days ago
- Written in: Java
Operating systems
Operating system	Server: Windows, OS X, Linux.; Player: AC Ryan PlayOn!HD, Sony Anycast, Apple iPad, Apple iPhone, Apple iPod, Apple TV, Asus O!Play, BlackBerry, Boxee, Brite-view CinemaTube, Cambridge Audio BD Players, DirecTV HR, D-Link DSM, Freebox, Freecom MusicPal, Google Android, Google Chromecast, Hama Internet Radio, LG Smart TV Upgrader, LG TVs, Logitech Squeezebox, Microsoft Xbox 360, Microsoft Xbox One, Miracast M806, Netgear NeoTV, Nokia N900, Onkyo A/V Receivers, OPPO Blu-ray players, Panasonic Sound Systems, Panasonic TVs, Philips Streamium, Philips TVs, Pioneer Kuro, Popcorn Hour, Realtek media players, Roku 3, Samsung smart phones, Samsung TVs, Sharp TVs, Showtime, Sony A/V receivers, Sony Blu-Ray players, Sony Network Media Players, Sony PlayStation 3 (PS3), Sony PlayStation 4 (PS4), Sony PlayStation Vita, Sony smart phones, Sony TVs, Telstra T-Box, Technisat S1+, VideoWeb TV, Vizio Smart TVs, Western Digital WD TV Live, XBMC Media Center, Xtreamer, Yamaha A/V receivers
- Type: UPnP AV media servers
- License: GNU General Public License v2
- Website: universalmediaserver.com
- Repository: github.com/UniversalMediaServer/UniversalMediaServer

Universal Media Server is a DLNA-compliant UPnP media server. It originated as a fork of PS3 Media Server. It allows streaming of media files to a wide range of devices including video game consoles, smart TVs, smartphones, and Blu-ray players. It streams and transcodes multimedia files over a network connection to the rendering device, ensuring that a supported rendering device will receive the content in a format supported by the device. Transcoding is accomplished through packages from AviSynth, FFMpeg, MEncoder, and VLC.

Enhancements over its predecessor, PS3 Media Server, include web interface support for non-DLNA devices, more supported renderers, automatic bit rate adjustment, and many other transcoding improvements.

== See also ==
- UPnP AV media servers
- Comparison of UPnP AV media servers
- PS3 Media Server
