= Netgear Digital Entertainer =

Digital media player line

NETGEAR Digital Entertainer 8000 HD

Netgear's Digital Entertainer line of products are digital media players that can pull multimedia content from home computers to the typical audio/video entertainment center. There are three products in the line, the EVA700, the HD EVA8000 and the current EVA9150 Digital Entertainer Elite. All support high definition video, the EVA700 via component output up to 1080i and the EVA8000/EVA9000 up to 1080p with both component and HDMI connectors. All models support audio, video, image and streaming audio and video formats and can be networked via wired and Wireless Ethernet. The EVA700 is Intel Viiv certified.

== Description ==
Common features of both EVA models include being able to access digital media files on a network attached home computer running Windows XP, stream audio and video from the PC, and stream Internet radio (streaming MP3). USB storage devices such as iPods, thumb drives, and some digital cameras with USB interfaces can be attached directly to the units for playback of media on those USB devices.

As the Digital Entertainer products are Intel Viiv compliant, setup and media access with an Intel Viiv PC is more automated than without such a PC. However, an Intel Viiv PC is not required in order to operate an EVA unit.

The systems come with a remote control with which to manipulate the on-screen display on your television along with a large selection of suitable connecting cables.

Inputs/Outputs: At a minimum, EVAs have RCA connectors for composite video output, as well as for component video output, S-Video output, a digital S/PDIF audio output, stereo RCA audio outputs, at least 1 USB 2.0 port and 1 8P8C 10/100 Ethernet port.

== History: MP101 and MP115 ==
NETGEAR started off in the media streamer arena with the MP101, an audio-only small form factor media streamer. It had a four-line fluorescent display with line stereo RCA and 3.5" headphone outputs. Connectivity provided by built-in Ethernet and 802.11b wireless with WEP support. Controlled by a remote control, it had no external buttons at all, not even a power button. The unit could play MP3 and WMA files, along with PLS and M3U playlists. Rhapsody streaming radio was built in, and the unit could also play any MP3 streams through playlists.

The MP115 was a technology trial, and only 600 were made. It used the same small form-factor as the MP101 but without the display. This unit was probably what could be considered the beginnings of the Digital Entertainer line as it supported XviD and MPEG1 and MPEG2 playback and had composite, S-Video and SCART output for connection to a TV, along with line stereo RCA. Audio was still supported along the same lines as the MP101. Again, no external buttons and all control from the remote. Dual-antenna 802.11g wireless was on board with wired Ethernet port.

== EVA700 Digital Entertainer ==
Features:

- Dual 2 dBi antenna wireless reception
- Hardware-based Wired Equivalent Privacy (WEP) 40/64-bit & 128-bit encryption
- WPA-PSK (WPA-Personal) and WPA2-PSK (WPA2-Persona)
- 802.11g standard compliant (connects to 802.11b or 802.11g networks)
- Intel NMPR 2.0
- UPnP AV
- MP3s up to 320 kbit/s or variable bit rate (VBR)
- WMA8 and WMA9 files up to 192 kbit/s or variable bit rate(VBR)
- WMV up to 1080p (down-converted)
- Internet Radio (streaming MP3)
- Video Formats: MPEG1, MPEG2, MPEG4, AVI, WMV, Xvid
- Audio Formats: MP3, WAV, WMA, M3U, AAC
- Photo Formats: JPEG, BMP, PNG, TIFF, GIF
- Playlist Formats: M3U, PLS
- RCA connector for composite
- RCA connector for component (high definition up to 1080i)
- S-video port
- SCART connector for regions that require it
- Stereo RCA audio ports
- Digital coaxial S/PDIF audio port
- Ethernet port
- USB 2.0 port

== EVA8000 Digital Entertainer HD ==
Apart from adding high definition video support over HDMI, the EVA8000 also adds a number of other features over the EVA700. Starting with HD support, it plays Windows Media Video (WMV) 9, and MPEG-4 formats up to 1080p. As it supports Windows Media DRM (WMDRM10), it can play protected downloaded content from online services like Yahoo Music. If the PC has a TV tuner card, then the EVA8000 can be used as a pseudo-DVR, although it does not store any content on its own. By using 2 or more EVA8000s, music can be synchronized throughout a home (party mode) and there is also a "follow me" feature that lets you pick up where you left off on a program on another unit. The EVA8000 also comes with the ability to allow you to view and control your PC applications on your TV. Noticeable is the difference in the user interface between the 2 units.

Additional features over the EVA700:

- HDMI A/V connector
- Additional USB 2.0 port
- DLNA
- SMB Networking
- FLAC audio support
- Matroska (MKV) x264 video support
- DVD ISO / VIDEO_TS folder playback support
- Playlist formats: WPL, ASX, WAX, WVX, RMP
- Full HD (1080p) output

== EVA9150 Digital Entertainer Elite ==
This unit is essentially an updated EVA8000. No big new file format support is added or needed, but the main addition is an internal 500 GB hard disk allowing for playback of content without the need for a computer, NAS or attached USB hard drive. At least one of these is required for the EVA700 and EVA8000 to play back content other than live over the internet. The internal hard drive also buffers streaming content if desired.

Other additions include an ultra-low power standby mode, updated chassis, onboard dual-band (i.e.: 2.4 GHz and 5 GHz) WiFi-N (a.k.a. 802.11n) wireless network with internal antenna, and a hard power switch.
