= PlugPlayer =

- Developer(s): PlugPlayer, LLC.
- Initial release: 15 Oct 2008
- Stable release: 4.2.2 / 28 Sept 2012
- Operating system: Mac OS X, Android, iOS
- Available in: English, Chinese, Danish, Dutch, French, German, Italian, Japanese, Spanish, Swedish
- Type: UPnP AV Client
- License: proprietary (components are open source)
- Website: http://www.plugplayer.com/

PlugPlayer was the first widely used mobile UPnP/DLNA Control Point. Originally released for the iPhone in October 2008 with little fanfare, it has since been updated many times eventually adding support for iPad, Android, Google TV, and Mac OS X. As of the latest release, PlugPlayer is able to act as a media player, media renderer, and media server. The developer announced in the Google Play store that the Android app would not be supported after 31 October 2017.
