= EWX =

EWX or eWX may refer to:

== EWX ==
- EWX, identifier for the Austin/San Antonio, Texas National Weather Service Weather Forecast Office
- EWX 24/96, sound hardware produced by TerraTec

== eWX ==
- Suzuki eWX, a concept car introduced at the Indonesia International Motor Show
