= DigiOn =

Japanese software company

DigiOn, Inc.
- Company type: Private
- Industry: Software
- Founded: January 5, 1999
- Headquarters: Fukuoka, Fukuoka, Japan
- Key people: Hisatoshi Taura, CEO
- Products: DiXiM, DigiOnAudio, DigiOnSound
- Number of employees: 96 (January 2007)
- Website: www.digion.com

DigiOn, Inc. is a Japanese software company that develops multimedia, storage and networking products. It is headquartered in Fukuoka, Fukuoka, and has branch offices in Tokyo and Taipei.

It is a promoter member of the Digital Living Network Alliance (DLNA) and in November 2003, its DiXiM Media Server became the world's first media server software to acquire UPnP certification.
