= BubbleUPnP =

Media streaming software

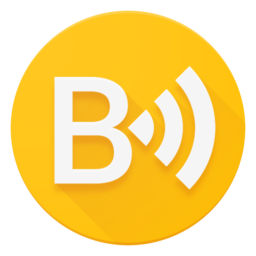
- Developer: Bubblesoft
- Release: June 10, 2011; 15 years ago
- Stable release: 4.1.3 / September 21, 2023; 2 years ago
- Operating system: Android
- License: Proprietary freemium
- Website: bubblesoftapps.com/bubbleupnp/

BubbleUPnP is a DLNA-compliant UPnP media controller, server and renderer, designed to allow streaming of audio or video from and to an Android device with various external devices and software. Alongside the Android client, it also has a server middleware application that can be installed on Windows, macOS and Linux computers or network storage devices, providing remote access through a web interface. BubbleUPnP also utilises ffmpeg and ffprobe for transcoding.

== Features ==
The app has three menus: Library (browsing media files locally or another server), Playlist (enqueuing files/folders), and Now Playing (controls the active media playback).

=== Server and controller ===
BubbleUPnP's integrated DLNA media server allows browsing of media of the Android device from other DLNA devices. The integrated renderer makes BubbleUPnP act as a control point on a home network between a source server and the player. According to the software website, it is able to play media to various external devices such as:

- Smart TVs that have DLNA as well as DLNA-browsing devices such as PlayStation 3 or Roku, as well as Xbox
- UPnP/DLNA/OpenHome music streamers from stereos/HiFis
- Chromecast devices, Amazon Fire TV, Nexus Player
- PC/NAS running a software like Kodi or JRiver Media Center, plus Raspberry Pi

There is also transcoding support for Chromecast devices and UPnP/DLNA music streamers.

=== Renderer ===
BubbleUPnP can play media from the local device itself, standalone UPnP/DLNA media servers (such as Kodi and Jellyfin) or those running on a NAS (including Synology, Western Digital and QNAP), local network SMB server shares (Windows and Mac), cloud storage services (such as Dropbox), WebDAV servers, and various third-party Android media and music apps. There is support for Internet radio streams like Shoutcast, which can be added in the Playlist menu by entering the URL of the stream.

=== Licensed version ===
BubbleUPnP is free to use and ad-supported; a number of advanced features are offered when purchasing a license, such as filesystem browsing from remote devices, unlimited playlist size, remote access to home libraries and no ads.

== BubbleUPnP Server ==
BubbleUPnP
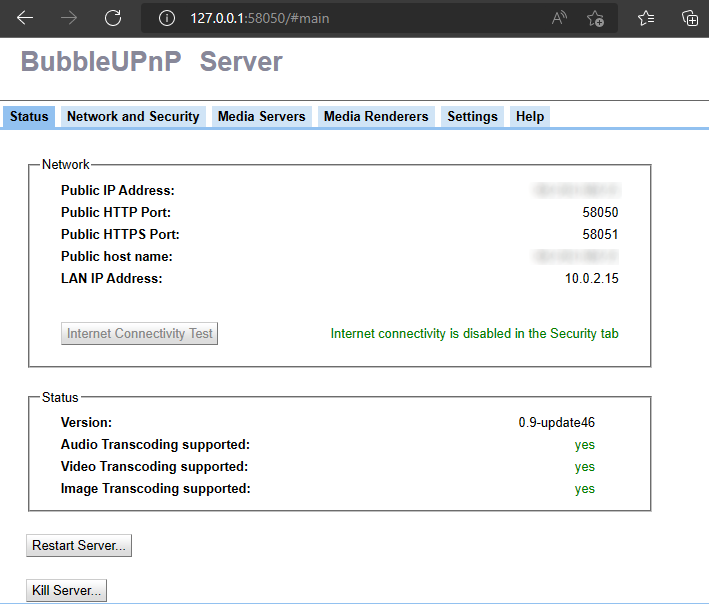
- BubbleUPnP Server running in Microsoft Edge on Windows 10
- Developer: Bubblesoft
- Stable release: 0.9
- Operating system: Windows, macOS, Linux, Java-based
- License: Free
- Website: bubblesoftapps.com/bubbleupnpserver2/

BubbleUPnP Server is a server application to run on a PC or NAS on top of existing UPnP/DLNA devices. It allows the transcoding of media formats to be playable on a Chromecast if they are not natively supported, such as Xvid, AVI and FLAC. The server also provides secure remote access to existing media servers content from the BubbleUPnP app on Android, and from foobar2000 (with foo_upnp plugin) on Windows. Streaming or downloading of media from a mobile or Wi-Fi connection is also permitted, removing the need of synchronisation or online services.

== See also ==
- List of UPnP AV media servers and clients
