= Serviio =

- Developer: Petr Nejedly
- Stable release: 2.3 (October 23, 2022; 3 years ago) [±]
- Operating system: Windows XP and later; OS X 10.8 and later; Linux; Synology NAS
- Platform: x86, ARM; Java SE
- Available in: English
- Type: Media server, Media player
- License: Proprietary software
- Website: www.serviio.org

Serviio is a freeware media server designed to let users stream music, video and image files to DLNA-compliant televisions, Blu-ray players, game consoles and Android and Windows Mobile devices on a home network.

== Overview ==
Serviio Android phone/tablet interface

The free version of Serviio will stream media within a home network to connected TVs, Blu-ray players, set-top boxes, the Sony PS3 and Microsoft Xbox 360. Since it is DLNA compliant, it will stream supported devices on the same network. Serviio also has a "Pro" license for $25 that will allow users to access their libraries outside the home. This license also enables dynamic transcoding to convert higher bit rate video or audio files into lower bit rate formats to permit viewing on slower broadband connections. Another paid feature is "media browser" that allows users to stream content to a web browser (desktop or mobile) at home or on the go.

== Pro Applications ==
The Pro license permits users to stream to third party applications for Android and Windows devices at home or on another network. In addition, users can use the server to watch online content including live TV or RSS feeds.

== Supported media formats ==
The server can read and if required transcode several media types for playback.

| Type | Supported Formats |
|---|---|
| Audio | MP3 ( .mp3), Windows Media Audio (.wma), AAC (.m4a), Ogg (.ogg, .oga), FLAC (.flac), DSF (.dsf) |
| Video | MPEG-1 (.mpg, .mpeg), MPEG-2 PS (.mpg, .mpeg, vob, mod), MPEG-2 TS (.ts, .m2ts), MPEG-4 (.mp4, m4v, mov), AVI (.avi, .divx), Windows Media Video (.wmv, .asf), Matroska (.mkv), Flash (.flv, .f4v), DVR-MS (.dvr, .dvr-ms), WTV (.wtv), Ogg (.ogv, .ogm), 3GP (.3gp), RealVideo (.rm, .rmvb) |
| Image | JPEG (.jpg, .jpeg), GIF (.gif), PNG (.png), RAW (.arw, .cr2, .crw, .dng, .raf, .raw,. rw2, .mrw, .nef, .nrw, .pef, .srf, .orf) |
| Playlists | PLS (.pls), M3U (.m3u, .m3u8), ASX (.asx, .wax., .wrx), WPL (.wpl) |
| Subtitles | SubRip (.srt, .txt), SSA/ASS (.ssa, .ass), MicroDVD (.sub, .txt), SAMI (.smi) |
