= VidiPath =

- Established: March 2014
- Type: Trade organization
- Headquarters: Lake Oswego, Oregon US
- Website: www.vidipath.com

VidiPath is a set of guidelines developed by the Digital Living Network Alliance (DLNA) that enables consumers to view subscription TV content on a wide variety of devices including televisions, tablets, phones, Blu-ray players, set top boxes (STBs), personal computers (PCs) and game consoles without any additional intermediate devices from the service provider. Consumer Electronics (CE) products that are certified to the VidiPath Guidelines can directly support the full range of subscriber HD programs, movies, DVR content, channel guides, and other premium features, all with a consistent user interface (UI) from their service provider.

In December 2012, the FCC ordered cable operators to use an open standard to update their cable boxes so they could support HD streaming over home networks to devices like PCs, smart TVs and tablets, and allow HD video recording on external devices through home networks, and cited the successor to the DLNA Premium Video Profile (later renamed VidiPath) as an example of a compliant protocol that cable companies could adopt. In May 2015, the FCC published an update saying that TiVo and cable operators that lease set-top boxes to subscribers now had until June 1, 2015 (or September 1, 2015 for smaller cable operators) to comply with the rule, and that TiVo had been issued a waiver until June 1, 2017, temporarily deferring TiVo's implementation of the DLNA standard.

VidiPath was also identified by the FCC in an August 2015 Final Report of the FCC's Downloadable Security Technology Advisory Committee (DSTAC). DSTAC promotes the competitive availability of navigation devices (e.g., set-top boxes and television sets) in furtherance of Section 629 of the Communications Act.

DLNA conducted a live demonstration of VidiPath at INTX 2015 using the Xfinity VidiPath Service for the X1 Platform running on Comcast production plant displayed on Samsung TV, Broadcom STB and a AwoX reference tablet.

Comcast, Time Warner Cable and Cox Communications have said they plan to offer VidiPath STBs or gateways.

== Timeline ==
- March 2014: DLNA publicly releases the VidiPath Guidelines, originally called “DLNA CVP-2 Guidelines"
- September 2014: DLNA introduces “VidiPath,” the consumer-facing brand of the guidelines, and also launches the VidiPath Certification program. The certification process involves multiple steps and varying fees based upon the product.
- 2015: Comcast launched the Xfinity for VidiPath service to prepare its subscribers for the availability of VidiPath Certified retail devices

== Market Outlook ==
In May 2015, ABI Research released results from a study it conducted on the anticipated impact of VidiPath Certified devices for subscription TV service delivery to interoperable devices. According to the study, VidiPath devices will be used in 40 percent of U.S. cable TV households that subscribe to advanced services by 2016 and 70 percent by 2020.
