= LiquidHD =

Technology for connecting consumer electronics

LiquidHD technology was an architecture and a set of protocols for networking consumer electronics devices. It was designed to let consumers link their HDTVs, home theater components, PCs, gaming consoles, and mobile devices into local entertainment networks, where they could view high-definition digital content from any networked source device on any compliant display. Silicon Image promoted LiquidHD in 2009 and sponsored a website for it that year.

== Description ==
The LiquidHD architecture allowed network connections to be made via Ethernet, coaxial cable (i.e., MoCA or G.hn), 802.11 wireless, powerline communication (such as G.hn or other specifications such as HomePlug, HD-PLC or Universal Powerline Association), phone lines (HomePNA or G.hn) or HDMI, depending on the usage scenario and what connections were already available. Once devices were linked in a LiquidHD network, users could control them via a remote user interface, enabling sharing of source devices and facilitating activities such as pausing a program in one room and resuming it in another.

LiquidHD included protocols for:

- Automatic discovery and authentication of LiquidHD-enabled devices
- High-definition media streaming from live and stored sources across the network
- Remote access of any source device's user interface to any LiquidHD display device, and for a single remote control at each display to control all source devices on a network.
- Secure communication between connected devices
- Security and content protection, including digital rights management for consumers to play their legally-obtained content on any LiquidHD display, and protect the network from hostile attacks

Development began in the summer of 2007.

It was announced January 8, 2009 at the Consumer Electronics Show in Las Vegas. By September 2009 analysts observed that no major customers had adopted the technology. After announcing declining sales in the Great Recession, the company replaced its chief executive in September 2009 as it was criticized for spreading itself over too many new initiatives. Silicon Image mentioned the technology on its web site in 2010, but quietly dropped it in early 2011 under new chief executive Camillo Martino.

== See also ==
Digital Living Network Alliance
