= PS3 Media Server =

DLNA-compliant UPnP media server

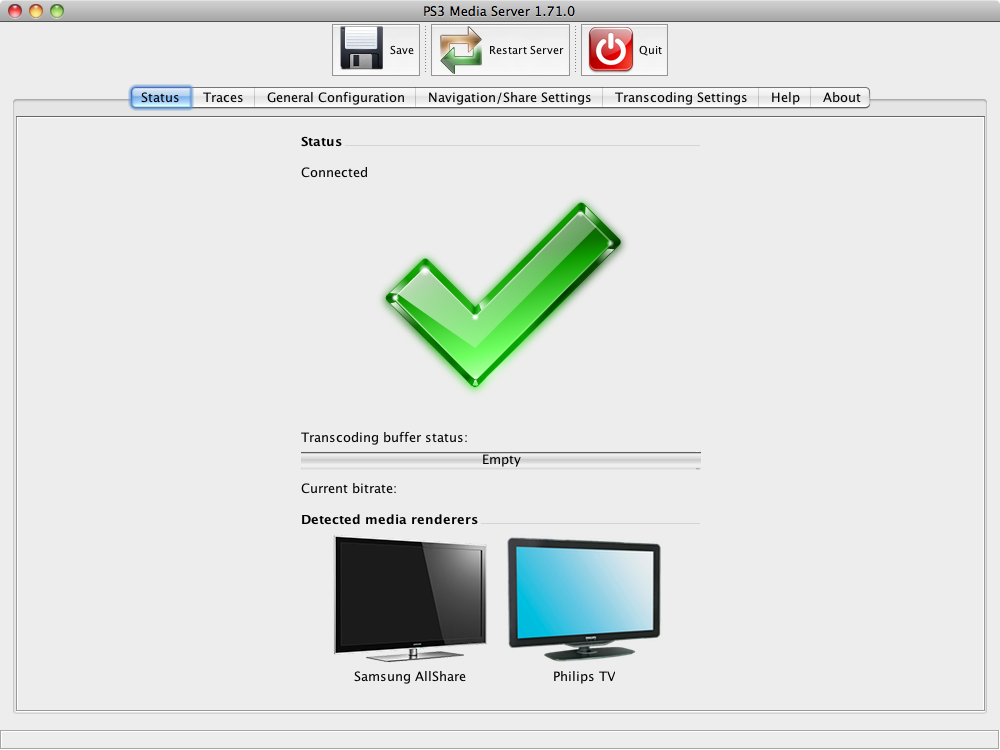
- OS X program showing two receiving televisions
- Developer: shagrath
- Release: 2009
- Stable release: 1.90.1 / August 17, 2013; 13 years ago
- Written in: Java
- Operating system: Microsoft Windows, OS X, Linux
- Platform: Java SE
- Type: UPnP media server
- License: GNU General Public License v2
- Website: ps3mediaserver.org
- Repository: github.com/ps3mediaserver/ps3mediaserver

PS3 Media Server is a DLNA-compliant UPnP media server. Originally written to support the PlayStation 3, it has been expanded to support a range of other media renderers, including Xbox 360, various Pioneer, Philips, Samsung, and Sony televisions, as well as portable devices. Written in Java, it streams or transcodes many different media formats, with minimum configuration. The FFmpeg and MPlayer packages support the PS3 Media Server. A currently maintained fork of PS3 Media Server exists as Universal Media Server.

== Awards ==
In December 2010, Lifehacker readers voted PS3 Media Server "Best Personal Media Streaming Tool" in a reader survey.

== See also ==
- Comparison of UPnP AV MediaServers
- UPnP AV MediaServers
