= Skifta =

- Developer: Qualcomm Atheros
- Release: 2009
- Website: www.skifta.com

Skifta was a media shifting service developed by Qualcomm Atheros. It enabled Android and Apple (IOS) smartphone and tablet users to access their music, pictures, and videos from their phone, from cloud media services or remotely from another location via a smart mobile device. The user could then stream media to connected consumer electronics anywhere that supports DLNA and UPnP standards over WiFi or 3G networks.

Skifta announced by email on May 30, 2014, to all their users that they would close the service on July 1, 2014.

== Overview ==
Skifta was available via a single client PC or Mac that could then be accessed by any DLNA and UPnP client from the home or remotely on mobile platforms running Android 2.2 and above. Users can control and stream their digital media within their home using the Skifta service. Downloading the Skifta mobile application enables users to access their digital media (music, photos, and videos) from their Android smartphone. If a Skifta user is not at home but near a DLNA certified TV, stereo, game console, Blu-ray player, camera or Windows 7 PC, they have the ability to remotely stream their media to those devices through their Android smartphone. The Skifta app is currently available at the Android Market, having launched the beta version of the service in January 2010 at the Consumer Electronics Show in Las Vegas. In early 2011, the Skifta app for Android became the first DLNA Certified(R) third-party application. Skifta 1.0 officially launched in October 2011.

At the 2012 Consumer Electronics Show, Qualcomm announced the Skifta Media Shifting Platform for entertainment-driven consumer electronics. The platform will provide device manufacturers with development kits and embedded software to include in stereos, wireless speakers, TVs, set-top boxes, wireless routers and NAS drives. The first component of the platform will be the Skifta Wireless Audio Adapter. The technology has since been rebranded Qualcomm Allplay

Skifta previously partnered with Netgear to distribute Skifta on the Netgear ReadyNAS Ultra line of storage drives. The Netgear boxes support Skifta as an add-on, allowing people to remotely access their media libraries on the storage drive from anywhere.
