= Teufel Audio =

German manufacturer

Teufel
- Native name: Lautsprecher Teufel GmbH
- Type: GmbH
- Industry: Electronics
- Founded: 1979; 47 years ago
- Founder: Peter Tschimmel
- Headquarters: Berlin, Germany
- Products: PC, THX, audio streaming, home theater and related speaker products
- Number of employees: about 350 worldwide (2025)
- Website: us.teufelaudio.com

Teufel Audio (also referred to as Teufel, German: Lautsprecher Teufel) is a German manufacturer of audio products such as loudspeakers, Bluetooth speakers, Wi-Fi streaming speakers, soundbars, headphones, hi-fi and home cinema systems. Founded in 1979, the Berlin-based company has sold its products mainly through direct sales since 1990.

== History ==
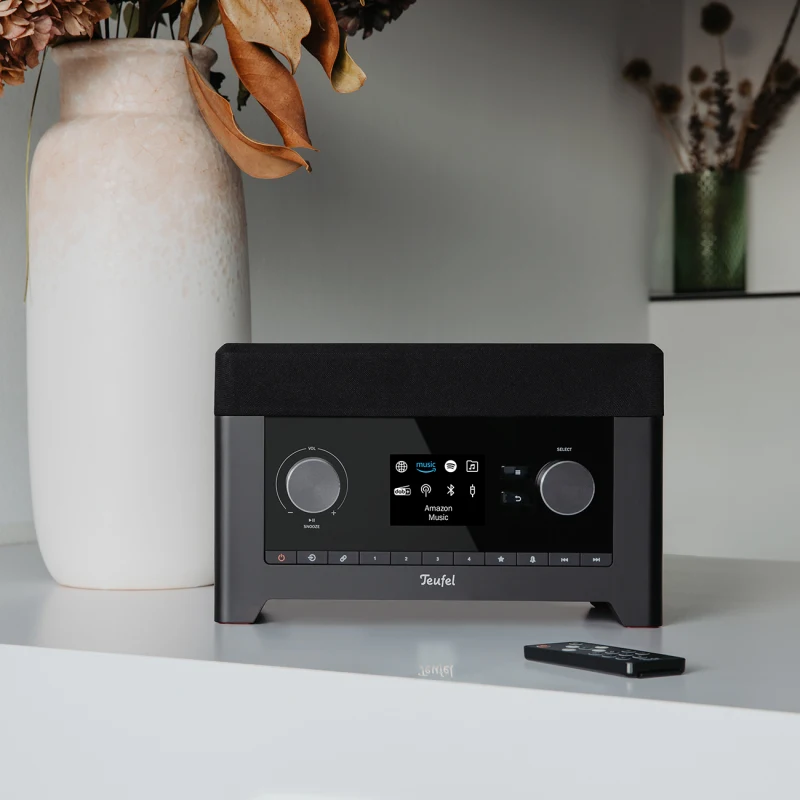
Teufel's Radio 3sixty

Teufel was founded in Berlin in 1979 by Peter Tschimmel, in the district of Kreuzberg. In the initial phase, the company produced and sold loudspeaker kits consisting of ready-made crossovers, drivers and cabinet components. The first products were loudspeaker sets. In 1988 it introduced its first fully assembled loudspeakers, the M 200 system with the matching M 6000 subwoofer.

In 1990, Teufel changed its distribution model, from specialist and retail outlets to direct sales via catalogue. For the launch of the DVD, the company introduced the Theater 2 in 1995, a 5.1 home cinema system, followed by the THX-certified Theater 8 in 1996.

In 2006 private equity firm Riverside acquired Teufel from founder Peter Tschimmel. Four years later, in 2010, private equity firm HgCapital acquired the company from Riverside. At the same time, Teufel integrated the Berlin-based start-up Raumfeld, which had been developing and selling multi-room streaming speakers since 2008. In summer 2018, French private equity company Naxicap took over the company. Sascha Mallah joined the management in August 2016, initially alongside Martin Herrmann. Since March 2020, Sascha Mallah has led the company as sole Managing Director.

In 2024, Teufel and Fender jointly launched a speaker line, the Fender x Teufel Rockster series of portable Bluetooth speakers. Through this partnership Teufel has also offered a limited range in North America since summer 2024.

== Company ==
In early 2025 Teufel employed around 350 people worldwide, roughly two-thirds of them in Berlin, where product development, design, marketing, sales, administration and customer service are based. Its products are manufactured in China, while product development remains in Berlin. Teufel´s Chinese office in Dongguan employs around 50 people responsible for supply management and quality assurance.

Alongside its online business, Teufel operates its own retail stores: a flagship store in the Bikini Berlin mall and a Teufel shop in the KaDeWe department store, both in Berlin, as well as stores in Essen, Cologne, Leipzig and Stuttgart, and in Vienna, Austria.

== Products ==
Teufel's range covers stereo and home cinema speakers, streaming and multi-room speakers, soundbars, portable Bluetooth speakers and headphones. In home cinema, the company has sold Dolby- and THX-certified systems of the Theater series since the 1990s. Portable Bluetooth speakers include the Boomster and Rockster series, the latter offered in cooperation with Fender since 2024. The Motiv range extends from the compact Bluetooth speaker Motiv Go to the larger Wi-Fi streaming speakers Motiv Home and Motiv XL.

In 2025 Teufel released the Mynd, a portable Bluetooth speaker made partly from recycled plastic and documented as open-source hardware, intended to be easy to repair and to allow customers and third parties to extend its functions. The concept had been presented at the IFA trade fair in September 2024.

In 2026 the company added the Ikonio, an active Wi-Fi streaming speaker in a one-box format that can be paired wirelessly with a second unit to form a stereo set, and, with the Studio 5X, its first active studio monitor.

=== Special editions and collaborations ===
In 2019, Teufel and the porcelain manufacturer Rosenthal released an active streaming speaker set limited to 500 units, with speaker and amplifier housings made from hard-paste porcelain at Rosenthal's works in Selb.

The Boomster has appeared in several visually distinct special editions, among them a 2021 version fronted by rapper Kelvyn Colt as brand ambassador, a 2023 version designed with mountain biker Fabio Wibmer and a 2024 edition marking the 50th anniversary of the band AC/DC.

For the 2015 launch of the Rockster, Teufel limited the first production run and supplied buyers with a one-year ARAG legal expenses insurance policy covering the defence of noise-nuisance charges arising from use of the speaker.

== Reception ==
The Berlin daily Tagesspiegel wrote in 2020 that the company, once viewed with scepticism as a maker of cheap, loud speakers, had come to enjoy a solid reputation in the high-end hi-fi scene. In 2025 WirtschaftsWoche described Teufel as one of the few German consumer-electronics companies that, alongside Sennheiser, still compete with international groups such as Sony, Bose and Samsung, at a time when brands including Telefunken, Nordmende, Saba and Grundig have disappeared or survive only as licensing labels.

The French testing lab DXOMARK scored the Boomster Bluetooth speaker 139 points, placing it between the Marshall Stanmore II and the Klipsch The Three II.

In August 2009 Teufel recalled CF-550/6 subwoofers from its Concept F loudspeaker system. According to the company, a component on the amplifier board could overheat and create a fire risk; certain production batches delivered since July 2007 were affected.
