= Windows Recorded TV Show =

- Filename extension: .wtv
- Internet media type: application/octet-stream
- Developed by: Microsoft
- Type of format: audio, video, container
- Extended from: DVR-MS

Windows Recorded TV Show (WTV) is a proprietary video and audiovisual file container format, developed by Microsoft used for storing TV content recorded by Windows Media Center. It is used in Windows Vista starting with Windows Media Center TV Pack 2008, and all Windows Media Center editions of Windows 7. The WTV format is the successor to the earlier DVR-MS file format that was used in Windows XP Media Center Edition.

Multiple data streams (audio and video) are wrapped in a container with the file extension WTV. Video is encoded using the MPEG-2 and MPEG-4 standard and audio using MPEG-1 Layer II or Dolby Digital AC-3 (ATSC A/52). The format extends these standards by including metadata about the content and digital rights management. Unlike the earlier DVR-MS format, WTV does not use ASF as the underlying container format.
