= WD TV =

Consumer device by Western Digital

- WD TV Live (1st Generation)
- Manufacturer: Western Digital
- Type: Digital media receiver
- Released: September 2013 (current release); November 2008 (original release)
- Connectivity: Wi-Fi (802.11a/b/g/n), 10/100 Ethernet, Micro-USB, HDMI

The WD TV is a discontinued series of consumer digital media players produced by Western Digital designed to play videos, images, and music from USB drives, internal drives or network locations. The WD TV line was introduced in 2008 and could play high-definition video through an HDMI port and standard video through composite video cables. The device had support for most common video and audio formats. The WD TV was discontinued as of August 2016.

== Models ==
=== WD TV (1st Gen) ===
In November 2008 Western Digital introduced the WD TV. with full HD 1080p multimedia player with DTS pass-through only. The hardware starts with a 300 MHz TangoX MIPS 4KEc from Sigma Designs, which has 100 MB of memory.

Model	Audio out	Video out	Built in	Online
WD TV (1st Gen)	1 HDMI 1.2; 1 Fiber Optic; 1 RCA	1 HDMI 1.2; 1 Component; 1 Composite 1080i/p 720p 576i/p (PAL); 480i/p (NTSC)	2 USB 2.0	none
WD TV (1st Gen)	Supported formats			
WD TV (1st Gen)	Video	MP4/MOV (MPEG4, h.264); AVI (AVC, MPEG1/2/4); WMV9, MPG/MPEG, VOB, DVR-MS; MKV (h.264, AVC, MPEG1/2/4, VC-1)		
WD TV (1st Gen)	Photo	JPEG, GIF, TIF/TIFF, BMP, PNG		
WD TV (1st Gen)	Audio	MP3, WAV/PCM/LPCM, WMA, AAC, FLAC, MKA, AIF/AIFF, OGG, Dolby Digital, DTS (pass-through only)		
WD TV (1st Gen)	Playlist	PLS, M3U, WPL		
WD TV (1st Gen)	Subtitle	SRT		

=== WD TV (2nd Gen) ===
Updated device with 2-channel DTS support. Uses the same Sigma SMP8655 Secure Media Processor as the Live.

Model	Audio out	Video out	Built in	Online
WD TV (2nd Gen)	1 HDMI 1.3; 1 Fiber Optic; 1 RCA	1 HDMI 1.3; 1 Component; 1 Composite 1080i/p 720p 576i/p (PAL); 480i/p (NTSC)	2 USB 2.0	none
WD TV (2nd Gen)	Supported formats			
WD TV (2nd Gen)	Video	MP4/MOV (MPEG4, h.264); MPG/MPEG, M2TS, WMV9; AVI (Xvid, AVC, MPEG1/2/4); TS/TP/M2T (MPEG1/2/4, AVC, VC-1); MKV (h.264, x.264, AVC, MPEG1/2/4, VC-1)		
WD TV (2nd Gen)	Photo	JPEG, GIF, TIF/TIFF, BMP, PNG		
WD TV (2nd Gen)	Audio	MP3, WAV/PCM/LPCM, WMA, AAC, FLAC; MKA, AIF/AIFF, OGG, Dolby Digital, DTS		
WD TV (2nd Gen)	Playlist	PLS, M3U, WPL		
WD TV (2nd Gen)	Subtitle	SRT, ASS, SSA, SUB, SMI		

=== WD TV Mini ===
Released in Fall 2009, it was a Media Player with DVD quality, upscales to 1080i, Plays back RealVideo and many other popular file formats with no need for transcoding, but lacks the ability to play H.264-encoded video. It is the only WD TV device without HDMI, providing only analog video output.

Model	Audio out	Video out	Built in	Online
WD TV Mini	1 Fiber Optic; 1 RCA	1 Component; 1 Composite 1080i 720p 576i/p (PAL); 480i/p (NTSC)	1 USB 2.0	none
WD TV Mini	Supported formats			
WD TV Mini	Video	MP4/MOV (MPEG4); AVI (Xvid, MPEG1/2/4); MPG/MPEG, VOB, RM or RMVB 8/9/10		
WD TV Mini	Photo	JPEG, GIF, TIF/TIFF, BMP, PNG		
WD TV Mini	Audio	MP3, WAV/PCM/LPCM, WMA, AAC; FLAC, MKA, OGG, Real Audio, APE		
WD TV Mini	Playlist	PLS, M3U, WPL		
WD TV Mini	Subtitle	SRT, ASS, SSA, SUB, SMI		

=== WD TV Live ===
Rear view of WD TV Live

Released in Fall 2009 with Full HD 1080p resolution. An updated device with 2-channel DTS, streaming and network support, which comes in the form of an Ethernet port on the back. Also compatible with certain wireless USB adapters. Connects to Internet sites: YouTube (until 2017), Flickr, Live365, myTV, Pandora, Mediafly, Flingo, AccuWeather, Facebook or stream content from a home network. Supports a wide variety of the most popular file formats. No need for transcoding. Mediafly and DVD menu support added in firmware update.

The device supports three playlist formats.

The Sigma Designs SMP8655 SoC inside the WD TV Live features a 500 MHz CPU, a 333 MHz coprocessor, a 333 MHz DSP, 512 MB of DRAM, and 256 MB of NAND flash memory. Western Digital has tweaked the original Sigma SMP8600 Family design slightly by including 6 video Digital-to-Analog Converters (DACs) which should give it the ability to handle high-def content with ease. (Model number WDBAAN0000NBK).

Model	Audio out	Video out	Built in	Online
WD TV Live	1 HDMI 1.3; 1 Fiber Optic; 1 RCA	1 HDMI 1.3; 1 Component; 1 Composite 1080i/p 720p 576i/p (PAL); 480i/p (NTSC)	2 USB 2.0; 1 Ethernet	Facebook; AccuWeather; Deezer; Flingo; TuneIn; YouTube; Pandora; Flickr; Live365.com; Mediafly; Funspot
WD TV Live	Supported formats			
WD TV Live	Video	MP4/MOV (MPEG4, h.264); AVI (Xvid, AVC, MPEG1/2/4); MPG/MPEG, VOB, M2TS, WMV9; TS/TP/M2T (MPEG1/2/4, AVC, VC-1); MKV (h.264 AVC, MPEG1/2/4, VC-1)		
WD TV Live	Photo	JPEG, GIF, TIF/TIFF, BMP, PNG		
WD TV Live	Audio	MP3, WAV/PCM/LPCM, WMA, AAC, FLAC; MKA, AIF/AIFF, OGG, Dolby Digital, DTS		
WD TV Live	Playlist	PLS, M3U, WPL		
WD TV Live	Subtitle	SRT, ASS, SSA, SUB, SMI, PGS, VobSub		
WD TV Live	File systems	FAT32, NTFS, HFS+, NFS		

=== WD TV Live Plus (WD TV Live 2nd Gen) ===
Released early in 2010 and having all the features of the WD TV Live along with Netflix streaming support. In order to support Netflix, a macrovision enabled SoC was required (Sigma Designs SMP8654) and the Linux system is also now encrypted. However, actual user experience has lagged for some. As of April 12, 2011, Netflix Canada works on a WD Live TV Plus as long as the firmware has been upgraded to version 1.04.31_B or newer. It is also known as WDTV Live Plus (Model number WDBABX0000NBK, WDBREC0000NBK, WDBG3A0000NBK).

Model	Audio out	Video out	Built in	Online
WD TV Live Plus	1 HDMI 1.3; 1 Fiber Optic; 1 RCA	1 HDMI 1.3; 1 Component; 1 Composite 1080i/p 720p 576i/p (PAL); 480i/p (NTSC)	2 USB 2.0; 1 Ethernet	Netflix; Blockbuster; CinemaNow; Facebook; Hulu Plus; AccuWeather; Deezer; Flingo; TuneIn; YouTube; Pandora; Flickr; Live365.com; Mediafly
WD TV Live Plus	Supported formats			
WD TV Live Plus	Video	MP4/MOV (MPEG4, h.264); AVI (Xvid, AVC, MPEG1/2/4); MPG/MPEG, VOB, M2TS, WMV9; TS/TP/M2T (MPEG1/2/4, AVC, VC-1); MKV (h.264, x.264, AVC, MPEG1/2/4, VC-1)		
WD TV Live Plus	Photo	JPEG, GIF, TIF/TIFF, BMP, PNG		
WD TV Live Plus	Audio	MP3, WAV/PCM/LPCM, WMA, AAC, FLAC; MKA, AIF/AIFF, OGG, Dolby Digital, DTS		
WD TV Live Plus	Playlist	PLS, M3U, WPL		
WD TV Live Plus	Subtitle	SRT, ASS, SSA, SUB, SMI, PGS, VobSub		
WD TV Live Plus	File systems	FAT32, NTFS, HFS+, ext3		

Reviews: WD TV Live Plus was met with generally positive reviews. Review Horizon names it a worthy successor of WD TV Live.

=== WD TV Live Hub ===
Released in fall 2010, this is a WD TV Live device with an internal 1 TB storage disk. It uses the same Sigma Designs SMP8654 found in the WD TV Live Plus with four 64 MB Nanya NT5TU64M16GG DDR2 667/800 MHz modules (256 MB total), and a 2 GB Samsung K9F2G080UB flash chip.

Model	Audio out	Video out	Built in	Online
WD TV Live Hub	1 HDMI 1.4; 1 Fiber Optic; 1 RCA	1 HDMI 1.4; 1 Component; 1 Composite 1080i/p 720p 576i/p (PAL); 480i/p (NTSC)	Modified Linux OS; Media Server; Games; Programmable Remote 1 TB hard drive 2 USB 2.0 (Supports Keyboard, External Drives, Wireless Antenna); 1 Gigabit Ethernet	Netflix; Blockbuster; YouTube; Facebook; Pandora; Slingbox; Flickr; Live365.com; Mediafly; AccuWeather; Picasa; Flingo
WD TV Live Hub	Supported formats			
WD TV Live Hub	Video	MP4/MPV/MOV (MPEG4, h.264); AVI (Xvid/DivX, AVC, MPEG1/2/4); MPG/MPEG, VOB, WMV9, FLV; TS/TP/M2T/M2TS (MPEG1/2/4, AVC, VC-1); MKV (h.264, x.264, AVC, MPEG1/2/4, VC-1)		
WD TV Live Hub	Photo	JPEG, GIF, TIF/TIFF, BMP, PNG		
WD TV Live Hub	Audio	MP3, WMA, OGG/OGA, MKA, FLAC; WAV/WAVE/PCM/LPCM; AAC/M4P/M4R, MPEG2/M2A; AIF/AIFF, Dolby Digital, DTS		
WD TV Live Hub	Playlist	PLS, M3U, WPL		
WD TV Live Hub	Subtitle	SRT, ASS, SSA, SUB, SMI, PGS, VobSub		
WD TV Live Hub	File systems	FAT32, NTFS, HFS+		

=== WD TV Live Streaming (WD TV Live 3rd Gen) ===
Released in October 2011. It has customizable themes, a larger remote control, can get content information from the internet, plays DRM-protected services, has a built-in wireless adapter, a 10/100 Mbit/s RJ45 Ethernet port and is the first WD TV model to include the Spotify service. The WD TV Live has WiFi and a Sigma Designs SMP8670AD 700 MHz processor with 512 MB of DDR2 memory from Nanya. It is also known as WD TV Live Gen 3 (NTSC model number WDBHG70000NBK, PAL model number WDBGXT0000NBK).

Model	Audio out	Video out	Built in	Online
WD TV Live Streaming	1 HDMI 1.3; 1 Fiber Optic; 1 RCA	1 HDMI 1.3; 1 Composite 1080i/p 720p 576i/p (PAL); 480i/p (NTSC)	2 USB 2.0; 1 Ethernet; Wi-Fi	Netflix; Spotify; Blockbuster; CinemaNow; Facebook; Hulu Plus; AccuWeather; Deezer; Flingo; TuneIn; YouTube; Pandora; Flickr; Live365.com; Mediafly
WD TV Live Streaming	Supported formats			
WD TV Live Streaming	Video	MP4/MOV (MPEG4, h.264); AVI (Xvid, AVC, MPEG1/2/4); MPG/MPEG, VOB, M2TS, WMV9; TS/TP/M2T (MPEG1/2/4, AVC, VC-1); MKV (h.264, x.264, AVC, MPEG1/2/4, VC-1)		
WD TV Live Streaming	Photo	JPEG, GIF, TIF/TIFF, BMP, PNG		
WD TV Live Streaming	Audio	MP3, WAV/PCM/LPCM, WMA, AAC, FLAC; MKA, AIF/AIFF, OGG, Dolby Digital, DTS		
WD TV Live Streaming	Playlist	PLS, M3U, WPL		
WD TV Live Streaming	Subtitle	SRT, ASS, SSA, SUB, SMI, PGS, VobSub		
WD TV Live Streaming	File systems	ext3, FAT32, NTFS, HFS+		

=== WD TV Play (WD TV 4th Gen) ===
According to the WD Site, it was released in early 2013. (NTSC model number WDBMBA0000NBK). Their exact words are:

With the WD TV Play Media Player, we have changed the interface, while retaining all of the favorite features such as customizable themes, the ability to get content info from the internet, as well as the same built-in wireless capabilities used by the WD TV Live Streaming Media Player. Also, like the WD TV Live Plus, WD TV Live Streaming, and WD TV Live Hub, the WD TV Play is capable of playing DRM protected services. The remote control has been modified to fit the model's compact design, and we added specific buttons to the favorite Online Services for quick access to them.

The software does not support DTS or MPEG2, as these features were removed.

=== WD TV Media Player (WD TV 2nd Gen) ===
Released in July 2014. (NTSC model number WDBYMN0000NBK, PAL model number WDBPUF0000NBK). Identical hardware to the WDTV Live Streaming but missing Netflix. This last version of the WDTV was finally discontinued by Western Digital in June 2016 and is no longer available for sale through the manufacturer.

Model	Audio out	Video out	Built in	Online
WD TV	1 HDMI 1.3; 1 Fiber Optic; 1 RCA	1 HDMI 1.3; 1 Composite 1080i/p 720p 576i/p (PAL); 480i/p (NTSC)	2 USB 2.0; 1 Ethernet; Wi-Fi	Facebook; AccuWeather; Deezer (Premium+ service required); Spotify (Premium service required); Flingo; TuneIn; YouTube; Pandora; Flickr; Live365.com; Mediafly; Funspot
WD TV	Supported formats			
WD TV	Video	AVI (Xvid, AVC, MPEG1/2/4); MPG/MPEG, VOB; MKV (h.264, x.264, AVC, MPEG1/2/4, VC-1); TS/TP/M2T (MPEG1/2/4, AVC, VC-1); MP4/MOV (MPEG4, h.264); M2TS, WMV9, FLV (h.264)		
WD TV	Photo	JPEG, GIF, TIF/TIFF, BMP, PNG		
WD TV	Audio	MP3, WAV/PCM/LPCM, WMA, AAC, FLAC (up to 24/192); MKA, AIF/AIFF, OGG, Dolby Digital, DTS		
WD TV	Playlist	PLS, M3U, WPL		
WD TV	Subtitle	SRT, ASS, SSA, SUB, SMI		
WD TV	File systems	FAT32, NTFS, HFS+, NFS		

== Hacking ==
The WD TV has been hacked to enable further options, including using external optical drives, Ethernet connection via USB to Ethernet adapters, bittorrent downloading and improved thumbnail preview images. The newest versions of the WD TV (Streaming Media) have encrypted firmware and there were efforts to continue hacking them.

== See also ==
- Comparison of set-top boxes
