= Sony Anycast =

Compact portable video production systems

The Sony Anycast range is a series of compact portable video production systems that incorporate multi-camera video switching, audio mixing, titling and Internet streaming functionality in a single unit with an integrated display, allowing single-operator field production with minimal setup. The original Anycast Station, released in 2004, was the first product of its type and defined the new market segment.

== Original Model ==
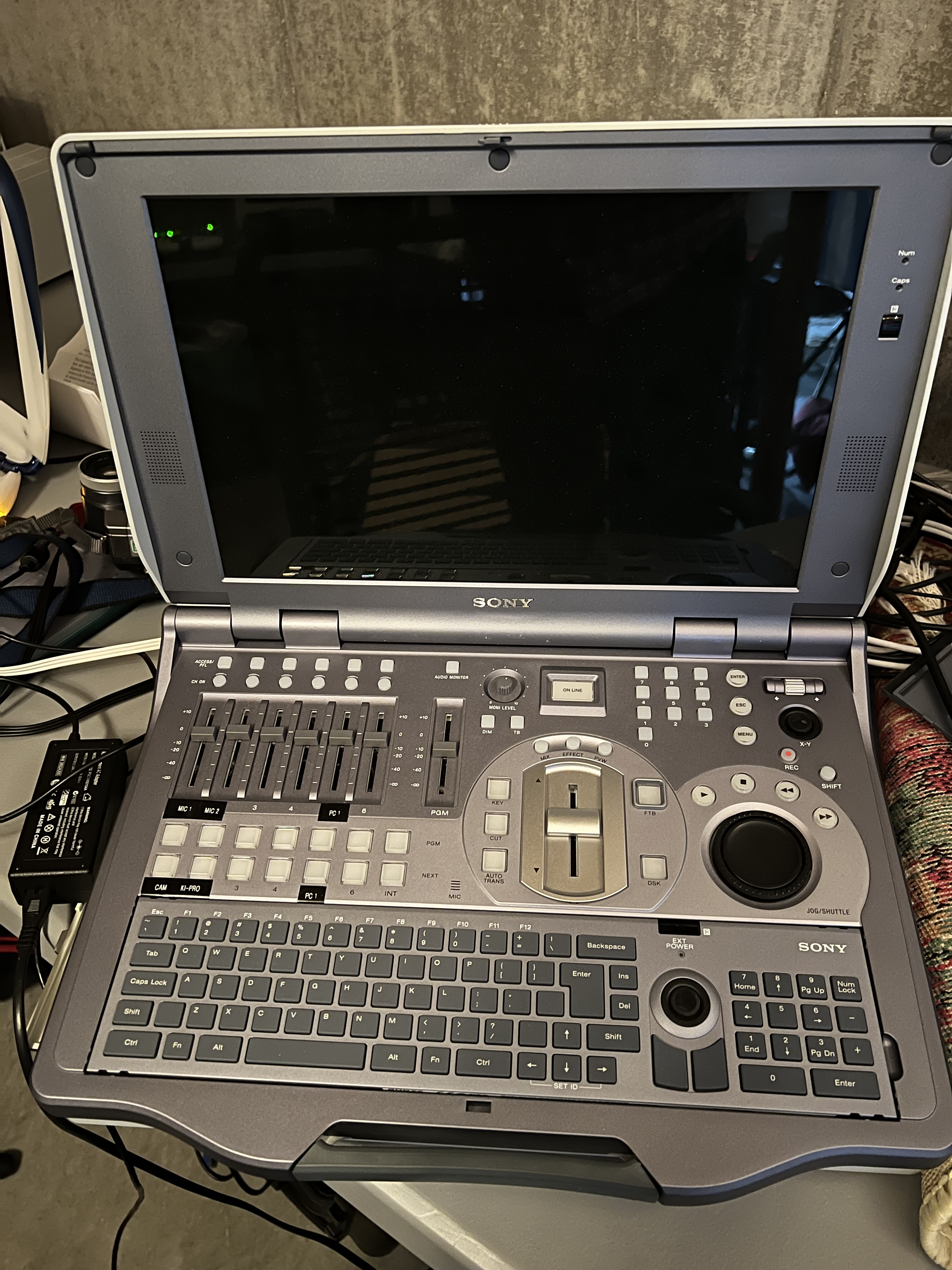
Sony Anycast Station AWS-G500, photographed in 2024

Sony launched the original AWS-G500 "Anycast Station" at the NAB television trade show in 2004. It was a modular system "about the size of a portable electric typewriter" featuring a six-channel video switcher, an audio mixer and basic titling software with a built-in keyboard, all in a clam-shell design with an integrated laptop-style LCD screen. The standard specification included four camera input channels and two VGA graphics input channels, but other configurations could be achieved by specifying different combinations of channel input modules. The program output of the system was available in standard definition analog, via a VGA connection, or digitally in DV format, but could also be encoded in RealMedia format and streamed to Internet viewers.

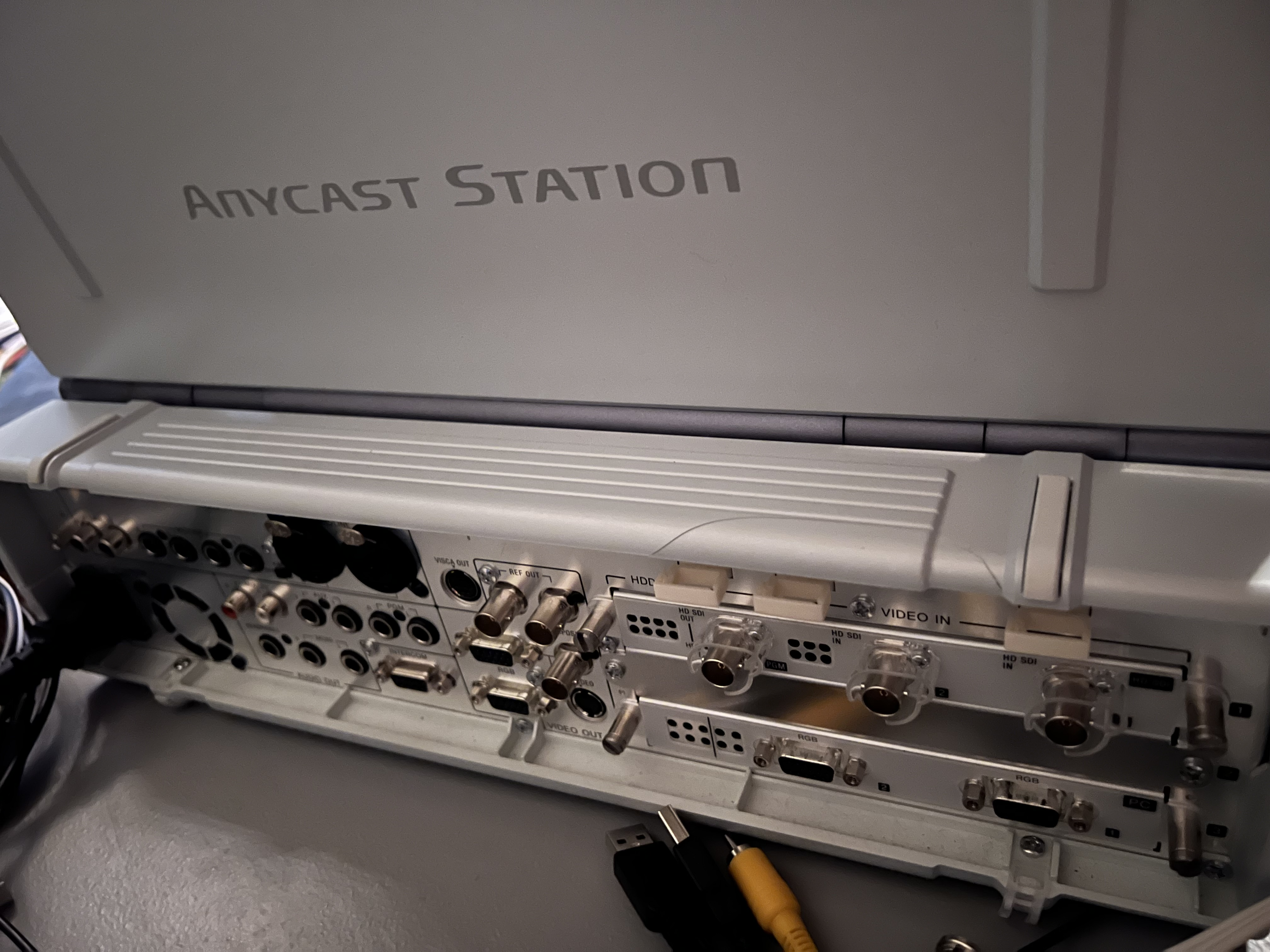
Sony Anycast Station rear ports. This model includes inputs for HD-SDI and PC video

The product was well received by trade journalists, being nominated as a "pick of the show" by several editors. However reviewers were critical of its high price and "awkward user interface".

In 2007 Sony released an updated version of the same platform, the AWS-G500HD, featuring HD channel input modules and HD software support.

== Anycast Touch ==
In 2013 Sony announced a significant update to the line with the release of the Anycast Touch. In the new model dual touchscreens replaced the existing upper display and lower physical control buttons, with all switching and mixing performed via touchscreen controls and typing done via an on-screen keyboard.
