= PlayOn =

Streaming media brand and software suite

- Type: Private
- Industry: Computer software
- Founded: August 2008; United States
- Headquarters: New York City; Seattle; Copenhagen, Denmark
- Products: PlayOn Cloud; PlayOn Desktop
- Services: Digital video streaming
- Website: www.playon.tv

PlayOn is a streaming media brand and software suite that enables users to view and record videos from numerous online content providers. The suite consists of two main products: PlayOn Cloud and PlayOn Desktop. PlayOn Cloud is an online service for recording digital video streams, accessible via native iOS or Android mobile device applications. PlayOn Desktop is Windows-based software that acts as a streaming dashboard and hub on the PC. The available streaming websites are organized as channels in both products. Users browse through or search the video content found in those channels in order to record the videos for later viewing. PlayOn Desktop allows watching the videos real-time on the PC, or casting the videos to a TV via a streaming device or gaming console.

The recording feature of PlayOn acts as a DVR for streaming videos, creating an MPEG-4 file which can be transferred to supported media devices. Users are then able to watch these videos without necessitating access to the Internet. The recording functionality inserts chapter marks at the locations of advertisements, allowing users to automatically skip commercials when watching via a native companion applications, directly in the PlayOn Desktop player on a PC, or via a variety of other DLNA-compliant media devices.

== Software ==
=== PlayOn Cloud ===
In August 2016, MediaMall launched PlayOn Cloud, a cloud-based DVR for streaming video, accessed and controlled from mobile apps available in the iOS App Store and Google Play. The PlayOn Cloud service starts a virtual machine in the cloud on behalf of the user. PlayOn Cloud charges users to initiate online recordings, through purchasing "credits" within the app. Videos are recorded in real-time, and once complete, can be downloaded directly to the app or to a PC, for later viewing.

PlayOn Cloud allows users to subscribe to an optional paid storage service, so that recordings can be stored indefinitely in the cloud. In March 2020, PlayOn.TV Australia was launched to provide the PlayOn Cloud app with region-specific features for the Australian audience.

=== PlayOn Home ===
In October 2021, PlayOn launched PlayOn Home, a Windows-based consumer software product that serves as a digital video recorder (DVR) for online videos. PlayOn Home records streaming content from numerous popular online streaming sites. Videos recorded by PlayOn Home can then be accessed and watched without the need for an Internet connection.[10]. It also acts as a digital media server to streaming devices, game consoles, televisions, and set-top boxes to watch recorded videos from online content providers such as Netflix, Hulu, and Amazon Video

PlayOn Home uses HTTP Streaming to communicate with devices such as Roku, Chromecast, iPad, iPhone, Android, Wii, and Wii U, working both as an Internet client to access online media and as a UPnP media server to serve videos to compliant devices.

=== PlayOn Desktop ===
In August 2008, MediaMall launched PlayOn Desktop, a Windows-based consumer software product. It acts as a digital media server to streaming devices, game consoles, televisions, and set-top boxes to watch Internet-based videos from online content providers such as Netflix, Hulu, and Amazon Video.

PlayOn Desktop uses the technology standard Universal Plug and Play (UPnP), as defined by the Digital Living Network Alliance (DLNA), to communicate with networked gaming consoles like the PlayStation 3, Xbox 360, and other Internet ready DLNA enabled devices. It uses HTTP Streaming to communicate with devices such as Roku, Chromecast, iPad, iPhone, Android, Wii, and Wii U, working both as an Internet client to access online media and as a UPnP media server to serve videos to compliant devices.

In September 2021, PlayOn effectively stopped supporting PlayOn Desktop as a result of ongoing changes associated with the release of Windows 11. PlayOn released PlayOn Home in October 2021 which allowed for the addition of new features and channels which were not able to be supported with the limitations of PlayOn Desktop. As part of the transition, PlayOn offered free months of the new PlayOn Home (up to a year) for those with PlayOn Desktop licenses.

=== MyMedia ===
MyMedia was a free media server software application that allowed users to stream personal media from their PC to various media devices. It was released on May 22, 2013. It was retired in September 2015.

The MyMedia brand is still available as a channel on Roku devices. It allows users to stream personal media to their Rokus from the PlayOn Media Library. Users can stream or cast music, photos, and home videos or local video files to their Roku.

=== PlayLater ===
PlayLater was released in 2011. It was rolled into PlayOn Desktop in 2015.

PlayLater was released September 2011, as a digital video recorder (DVR) for online videos. PlayLater recorded streaming content from numerous popular online streaming sites. Videos recorded by PlayLater could then be accessed and watched without the need for an Internet connection.

PlayLater was rolled into PlayOn Desktop in September 2015, and is no longer available as a stand-alone software product.

== Supported devices ==
PlayOn Cloud is available as a native application on iOS and Android. Videos recorded with PlayOn Cloud, once downloaded from the cloud service, can be viewed directly in the given mobile application. Similarly, recordings can be downloaded and viewed on the user's PC, or on home-networked devices, using any media streaming software.

Videos recorded with PlayOn Desktop can be viewed via a device that supports the technology standard Universal Plug and Play (UPnP) as defined by the Digital Living Network Alliance (DLNA). DLNA devices use the home network to connect to the PC with PlayOn Desktop installed. The device is then able to interact with PlayOn Desktop and lets users view streaming content on that system. There are native PlayOn Desktop applications for Roku, iOS, and Android.

== Content ==
PlayOn Desktop and PlayOn Cloud support a number of online content providers, including Netflix, Hulu, Disney+ and Amazon Prime Video. Many of the channels require an active subscription to access. PlayOn Desktop provides access to more channels than PlayOn Cloud.
