= TVersity Media Server =

- Developer(s): TVersity, Inc.
- Final release: 3.8 / 29 July 2015
- Operating system: Windows XP, Windows Server 2003, Windows Vista, Windows 7
- Size: 72.9 MB
- Available in: English
- Type: UPnP media server
- License: Proprietary
- Website: http://www.tversity.com/

TVersity Media Server is a software application that streams multimedia content from a personal computer to UPnP, DLNA and mobile devices (Chromecast is also supported). It was the first media server to offer real-time transcoding. Some examples of supported devices are the Xbox 360, PlayStation 3, and Wii.

The first version of the software was released back on May 10, 2005 and it offered real-time transcoding of personal media and web media from the very first day. For example, the Xbox 360 does not support most codecs. TVersity Media Server transcodes the video on the PC into a compatible codec and then streams it to the device.

TVersity aims to:

- Deliver any media to any device
- Provide a Personal Entertainment Guide (PEG) by allowing users to create a personalized lineup of channels from URLs, RSS feeds, playlists and more.

While built from open source components, TVersity Media Server as a whole is not open source (except for the bundled codecs). TVersity Pro sold for $24.99 in the U.S., though there was also a free version available that did not stream from online video sites and did not transcode.

The software has been discontinued by its supplier.
