= Netgear MP101 =

The Netgear MP101 was the first of a series of digital media receivers by Netgear.

== Family history ==
The Netgear MP101's family also includes other devices such as the MP115, the EVA700 and, the EVA8000.

== Appearance ==
The Netgear MP101 is a small brushed silver unit that can provide a link between a PC-based MP3 collection and a conventional hi-fi.

== Concept ==
The MP101 requires a UPnP AV media server to provide access to digital media, while some other units (and the later EVA8000) can read from a Windows share directly (or a NAS device).

Netgear does not manufacture the devices itself, but they are produced instead by a third-party company and then marketed as a Netgear product.

== Implementation ==
The MP101 is based on the ARM9 Marvell Libertas 88W8510H system-on-a-chip and has 8 MB of DRAM. Netgear licensed the ARM MP3 decoder software for use with the device.

The MP101 runs the open-source eCos real-time operating system. Netgear made the source code available online.
