= GeeXboX =

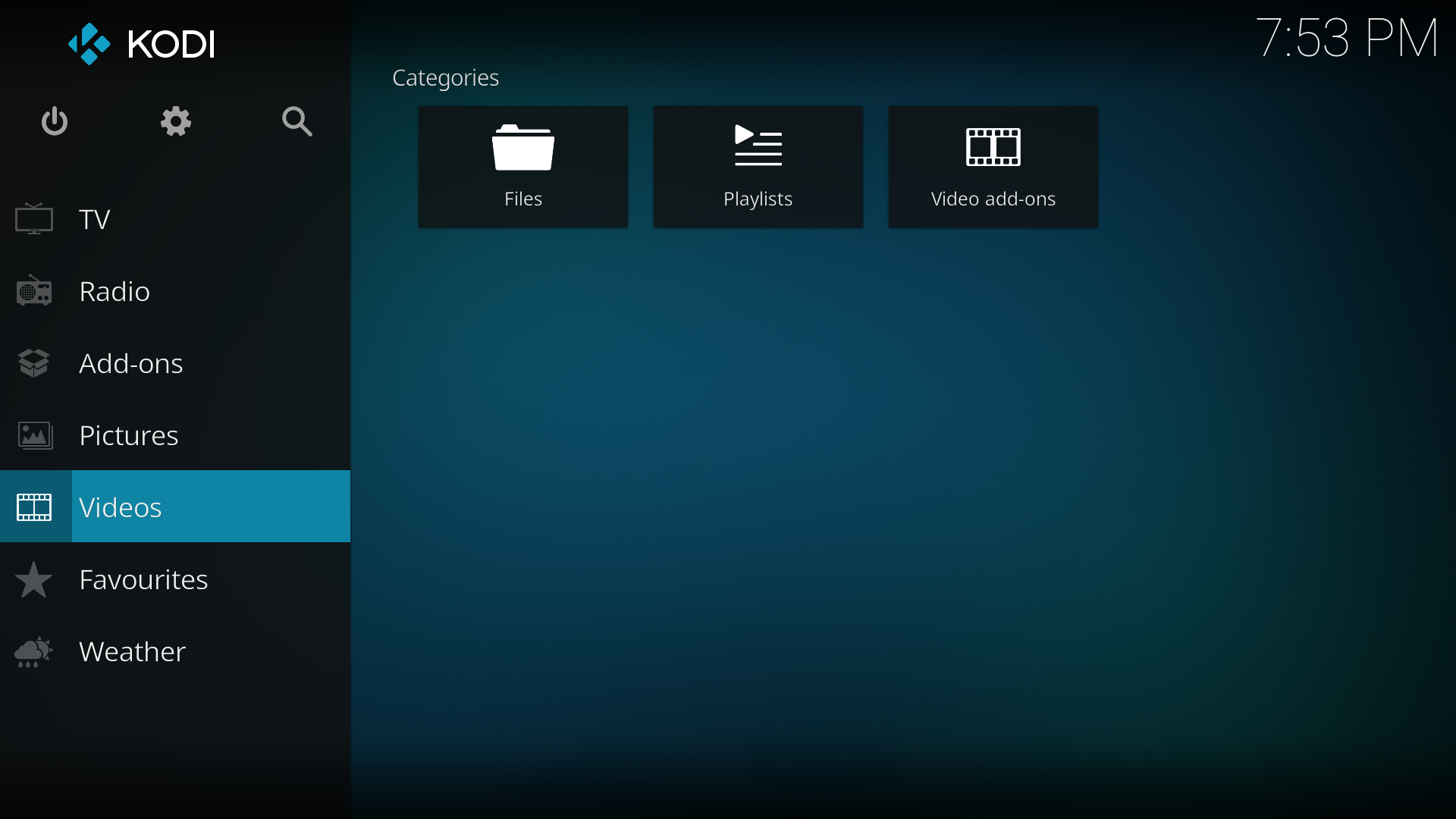
- Kodi 17.6 Home Screen
- Developer: Aurelien Jacobs and Benjamin Zores (Core Maintainers)
- OS family: Linux (Unix-like)
- Working state: Current
- Source model: Open source
- Latest release: 2019.04.27 / 27 April 2019; 7 years ago
- Repository: github.com/GeeXboX/geexbox
- Available in: International (multiple languages)
- Kernel type: Monolithic
- Default user interface: Kodi
- License: GNU GPL and various other open-source software licenses
- Official website: geexbox.github.io

Support status
- Current

GeeXboX (stylized as GeeXboX) is a free Linux distribution providing a media center software suite for personal computers. GeeXboX 2.0 and later uses XBMC for media playback and is implemented as Live USB and Live CD options. As such, the system does not need to be permanently installed to a hard drive, as most modern operating systems would. Instead, the computer can be booted with the GeeXboX CD when media playback is desired. It is based on the Debian distribution of Linux.

This is a reasonable approach for those who do not need media playback services while performing other tasks with the same computer, for users who wish to repurpose older computers as media centers, and for those seeking a free alternative to Windows XP Media Center Edition.

An unofficial port of GeeXboX 1.x also runs on the Wii.

== History ==
| GeeXboX version | | Release date |
|---|---|---|
| CuBox | armada5xx | 26 March 2019 |
| CuBox-i | imx6 | 27 March 2019 |
| Raspberry Pi | bcm2708 | 27 March 2019 |
| Raspberry Pi 2 | bcm2709 | 27 March 2019 |
| Generic | i386 | 27 March 2019 |
| Generic | x86_64 | 30 March 2019 |
| Utilite | imx6 | 28 March 2019 |
| Cubieboard | a10 | 28 March 2019 |

== See also ==
- List of free television software
- XBMC Media Center, the cross-platform open source media player software that GeeXboX 2.0 and later uses as a front end GUI.
