= DVR-MS =

File format

Microsoft Digital Video Recording
- Filename extension: .DVR-MS
- Developed by: Microsoft
- Initial release: 2004; 22 years ago
- Type of format: audio, video, container
- Extended to: .WTV

DVR-MS (Microsoft Digital Video Recording) is a proprietary video and audio file container format, developed by Microsoft used for storing TV content recorded by Windows XP Media Center Edition, Windows Vista and Windows 7.

Multiple data streams (audio and video) are wrapped in an ASF container with the extension DVR-MS. Video is encoded using the MPEG-2 standard and audio using MPEG-1 Audio Layer II or Dolby Digital AC-3 (ATSC A/52). The format extends these standards by including metadata about the content and digital rights management. Files in this format are generated from the Stream Buffer Engine (SBE.dll), a DirectShow component introduced in Windows XP Service Pack 1.

== Playback and editing ==
The DVR feature of Windows XP Media Center Edition, Windows Vista and the Windows 7 version of Windows Media Center create files in this format. If a recorded broadcast is marked as copy protected, the resultant DVR-MS file can only be played back on the recording device. Unprotected DVR-MS files (files not marked in this way) can be played back on any device running Windows XP with Service Pack 1 or later Windows operating systems, hotfix 810243 for Windows XP RTM (which adds DVR-MS support to DirectShow), and on Windows Mobile 6. For older Windows operating systems, any third-party media player which supports the DVR-MS format through DirectShow on Windows or by other means on Windows or other platforms can be used for playback.

Although it is not possible to edit unprotected DVR-MS files through older software programs such as Windows Movie Maker for Windows XP, the files can be edited using Windows Movie Maker for Microsoft Windows Vista or Sonic MyDVD. A simple registry tweak/hack also exists for allowing the Windows XP version of Windows Movie Maker to natively import/edit DVR-MS files. Some early freeware applications which convert the files can be found from third parties such as at The Green Button. Microsoft's Developer Network (MSDN) has an article with sample code and binaries demonstrating how to use DVR-MS and convert them to WMV. Also, Windows Media Player 10 shipped with a transcoder to convert DVR-MS to WMV only when syncing with portable devices such as a Portable Media Center.

MediaPortal also uses this format and comes with the plugin My Burner, which can be used to (automatically) convert DVR-MS files to regular MPEG-2. Also, Orb uses the DVR-MS file format for recording and streaming audio and video via its web-based DVR.

Some universal transcoders may be able to convert DVR-MS to other formats. DVR-MS can also be converted to another format changing only the container format (extracting the original MPEG-2 data without any visual loss) using FFmpeg and VLC media player's transcoding wizard.

== Phase out ==
Starting with Windows Media Center TV Pack 2008 and moving forward, Microsoft has indicated that DVR-MS is being replaced with the WTV format.

An update is available for Windows Media Player version 11 in Windows Vista to add playback support for WTV. Microsoft does not, however, provide a generic DirectShow filter to enable playback support in third party DirectShow-based media players on Windows Vista or on Windows XP Media Center Edition.

Windows 7 includes built-in support for converting non copy-protected WTV files to DVR-MS. Third party tools also exist to convert WTV to DVR-MS such as Andy VT's ToDVRMS and 3LS's ConvertWTV.
