= TerraTec =

TerraTec Electronic GmbH
- Founded: 1994; 32 years ago
- Headquarters: Nettetal, Viersen (district), Germany
- Key people: Walter Grieger and Heiko Meertz (Founders)
- Products: Sound cards, webcams, TV tuner cards
- Website: www.terratec.de

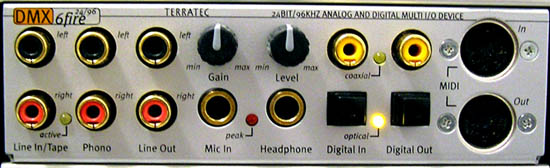
Terratec DMX 6fire 24/96

TerraTec Electronic GmbH is a German manufacturer of sound cards, computer speakers, webcams, computer mice, video grabbers and TV tuner cards. TerraTec is mainly known for its sound cards, and is the largest German producer of them.

The company was founded by Walter Grieger and Heiko Meertz in 1994 in Nettetal, Germany. Both Grieger and Meerts are still CEOs of the company.

There was a time when Terratec mainly produced graphic cards. But it dropped the production later and focused on sound cards. Furthermore, TerraTec is distributing hardware and software products like professional studio software Cubase for musicians or hardware like PhonoPreAmpiVinyl for digitizing recordings from vinyl or tapes to digital audio formats.

TerraTec also produces the "Axon" brand of Pitch-to-MIDI or guitar synthesizer converters. AXON's current models include the AX100 and the AX50USB.

== Products ==
=== Sound hardware ===
==== ISA cards ====
- EWS 64
- EWS 88 PCI card
- EWX 24/96
- Maestro series
- Gold series
- Base 1
- Base 2
- WT64 (wavetable add-on)

==== PCI cards ====
- Solo 1
- DMX
- DMX XFire 1024
- DMX 6Fire PCI
- 128i PCI
- 512i Digital
- Aureon 7.1
- Aureon 7.1 Universe

==== External devices ====
- DMX 6Fire USB
- Phase series
- Aureon USB series
- Aureon 8Fire series
- Aureon 7.1 FireWire

=== TV and Video Capture hardware ===
- TerraTV series (analog TV/FM tuner)
- TerraCAM series (webcams)
- VideoSystem Cameo (video editing card)

== See also ==
- Cubase
