= TwonkyMedia server =

Multi-media content home server

TwonkyMedia server (TMS) is DLNA-compliant UPnP AV server software originally offered by TwonkyVision GmbH. TMS runs on Linux, macOS, Microsoft Windows, iOS, Android and QNX operating systems. TwonkyMedia server can be used to share and stream media to most UPnP AV or DLNA-compliant clients, in addition to non-UPnP devices through the HTML, RSS, and JSON supported front ends. After the PacketVideo acquisition of Berlin-based TwonkyVision GmbH by 17 October 2006, Twonky was renamed PVConnect in November 2007, but the name was changed back to TwonkyMedia server by 7 January 2010. Corporate parent NTT DOCOMO sold PacketVideo NorthAmerica and Europe to Lynx Technology on 10 May 2015 and PacketVideo Japan exactly one year later on 10 May 2016 transferring the Twonky product line to Lynx, renaming TwonkyMedia Server to Twonky Server.
