= Mediafly =

- Type: Private
- Industry: Software
- Founded: Chicago, Illinois (2006)
- Founder: Carson Conant
- Headquarters: United States, Chicago, Illinois
- Key people: Carson Conant, Jason Shah, John Evarts
- Website: www.mediafly.com

Mediafly is a privately held technology company based in Chicago, Illinois that provides mobile enablement software.

== History ==
Mediafly was founded by Carson Conant in 2006 as a podcatcher. In addition to its mobile apps, in 2009, it was one of the first channels to be added to Roku’s channel store. That same year, the company began to transition from a consumer model to a business-to-business model, officially shutting down its podcasting applications in 2012.

In 2014 and 2015, the company was ranked on the Inc. 5000. As of 2015, the company has raised about $10 million from angel investors.
