= DLNA =

Set of wireless technology protocols

- Developed by: Digital Living Network Alliance
- Introduced: 2004; 22 years ago
- Industry: Local area networks
- Compatible hardware: Personal computers; Smartphones; Gaming consoles; Audio devices; Embedded devices; Smart TV

Digital Living Network Alliance (DLNA) is a set of interoperability standards for sharing home digital media among multimedia devices. It allows users to share or stream stored media files to various certified devices on the same network like PCs, smartphones, TV sets, game consoles, stereo systems, and NASs. DLNA incorporates several existing public standards, including Universal Plug and Play (UPnP) for media management and device discovery and control, wired and wireless networking standards, and widely used digital media formats. Many routers and network attached storage (NAS) devices have built-in DLNA support, as well as software applications like Windows Media Player.

DLNA was created by Sony and Intel and the consortium soon included various PC and consumer electronics companies, publishing its first set of guidelines in June 2004. The Digital Living Network Alliance developed and promoted it under the auspices of a certification standard, with a claimed membership of "more than 200 companies" before dissolving in 2017. By September 2014 over 25,000 device models had obtained "DLNA Certified" status, indicated by a logo on their packaging and confirming their interoperability with other devices.

== Specification ==
The DLNA Certified Device Classes are separated as follows:

=== Home network devices ===
- Digital Media Server Application (DMSA): store content and make it available to networked digital media players (DMP) and digital media renderers (DMR). Examples include PCs and network-attached storage (NAS) devices.
- Digital Media Player (DMP): find content on digital media servers (DMS) and provide playback and rendering capabilities. Examples include TVs, stereos and home theaters, wireless monitors and game consoles.
- Digital Media Renderer (DMR): play content as instructed by a digital media controller (DMC), which will find content from a digital media server (DMS). Examples include TVs, audio/video receivers, video displays and remote speakers for music. It is possible for a single device (e.g. TV, A/V receiver, etc.) to function both as a DMR (receives "pushed" content from DMS) and DMP ("pulls" content from DMS).
- Digital Media Controller (DMC): find content on digital media servers (DMS) and instruct digital media renderers (DMR) to play the content. Content does not stream from or through the DMC. Examples include tablet computers, Wi-Fi enabled digital cameras and smartphones.
- Generally, digital media players (DMP) and digital media controllers (DMC) with print capability can print to DMPr. Examples include networked photo printers and networked all-in-one printers.

=== Mobile handheld devices ===
- Mobile Digital Media Server (M-DMS): store content and make it available to wired/wireless networked mobile digital media players (M-DMP), and digital media renderers. Examples include mobile phones and portable music players.
- Mobile Digital Media Player (M-DMP): find and play content on a digital media server (DMS) or mobile digital media server (M-DMS). Examples include mobile phones and mobile media tablets designed for viewing multimedia content.
- Mobile Digital Media Uploader (M-DMU): send (upload) content to a digital media server (DMS) or mobile digital media server (M-DMS). Examples include digital cameras and mobile phones.
- Mobile Digital Media Downloader (M-DMD): find and store (download) content from a digital media server (DMS) or mobile digital media server (M-DMS). Examples include portable music players and mobile phones.
- Mobile Digital Media Controller (M-DMC): find content on a digital media server (DMS) or mobile digital media server (M-DMS) and send it to digital media renderers (DMR). Examples include personal digital assistants (PDAs) and mobile phones.

=== Home infrastructure devices ===
- Mobile Network Connectivity Function (M-NCF): provide a bridge between mobile handheld device network connectivity and home network connectivity.
- Media Interoperability Unit (MIU): provide content transformation between required media formats for home network and mobile handheld devices.

The specification uses DTCP-IP as "link protection" for copyright-protected commercial content between one device to another.

=== DLNA guideline versions ===
- 1.0: released June 2004; 2 volumes: Architecture & Protocols, Media Formats; 2 Device Classes: DMP, DMS; About 50 media format profiles
- 1.5: released March 2006; 3 volumes: Architecture & Protocols, Media Formats, and Link Protection; 12 Devices Classes and 5 Device Capabilities; About 250 media format profiles
- 2.0: released August 2015; Includes topics like EPG, Content Sync, GUI, WPS, Media Formats, Scheduled recording, DRM
- 3.0: released August 2015; enhanced response time, improved power efficiency, HEVC support
- 4.0: released June 2016; solves the "media format not supported" problem between PCs, TVs and mobile devices while supporting Ultra HD TV content streaming

== Products supporting DLNA ==
The media streaming dialog built into Windows 10 which uses DLNA to share media locally

=== DLNA-certified devices ===
Some of the earlier devices with DLNA included the PlayStation 3, the Nokia N95 and the Pioneer BDP-HD1 Blu-ray player. By 2014 over 25,000 DLNA-certified products were available, up from 9,000 in 2011. This includes TVs, DVD and Blu-ray players, games consoles, digital media players, photo frames, cameras, NAS devices, PCs, mobile handsets, and more. According to a 2013 study from Parks Associates, nearly 3 billion products were expected to be on the market in 2014, increasing to over 7 billion by 2018. DLNA certification of devices can be determined by a DLNA logo on the device, or by verifying certification through the DLNA Product Search.

=== DLNA-certified software ===
TwonkyMedia server, Serviio and BubbleUPnP are known examples of DLNA server software. All versions of Microsoft Windows since Windows 7 have native DLNA server and client support through Windows Media Player (it is named "media streaming").

In many cases DLNA protocols are in use by services or software without openly stating the name: examples include Nokia's Home Network functionality in Symbian OS, Samsung's All Share, the Play To functionality in Windows 8.1, and applications such as VLC media player or Roku Media Player.

== History and member companies ==
Digital Living Network Alliance
- Established: June 2003
- Founder: Intel
- Dissolved: February 2017
- Type: Trade organization
- Headquarters: Lake Oswego, Oregon, US
- Members: 200 companies
- Website: www.dlna.org

Intel established the Digital Living Network Alliance along with Sony and Microsoft in June 2003 as the Digital Home Working Group (DHWG), changing its name 12 months later, when the first set of guidelines for DLNA was published. Its board members as of 2007 were: HP, Intel, Matsushita, Microsoft, Nokia, Philips, Samsung, and Sony.

Home Networked Device Interoperability Guidelines v1.5 was published in March 2006 and expanded in October of the same year; the changes included the addition of two new product categories — printers, and mobile devices — as well as an "increase of DLNA Device Classes from two to twelve" and an increase in supported user scenarios related to the new product categories.

DLNA worked with cable, satellite, and telecom service providers to provide link protection on each end of the data transfer. The extra layer of digital rights management (DRM) security allows broadcast operators to communicate digital media to certain devices (e.g. to those of their customers) in such a manner that further, unauthorized, communication of the media is difficult.

In 2005, DLNA began a software certification program in order to make it easier for consumers to share their digital media across a broader range of products. DLNA is certifying software that is sold directly to consumers through retailers, websites and mobile application stores. With DLNA certified software, consumers can upgrade products from within their home networks that may not be DLNA certified and bring them into their personal DLNA ecosystems. This helps in bringing content such as videos, photos and music stored on DLNA certified devices to a larger selection of consumer electronics, mobile and PC products.

In March 2014, DLNA publicly released the VidiPath Guidelines, originally called "DLNA CVP-2 Guidelines." VidiPath enables consumers to view subscription TV content on a wide variety of devices including televisions, tablets, phones, Blu-ray players, set-top boxes (STBs), personal computers (PCs) and game consoles without any additional intermediate devices from the service provider.

In November 2015 there were 13 promoter members and 171 contributor members. The promoter members were:

Arris, AwoX, Broadcom, CableLabs, Comcast, Dolby Laboratories, Intel, LG Electronics, Panasonic, Samsung Electronics, Sony Electronics, Time Warner Cable, and Verizon.

The board of directors oversaw the activity of the four following committees:

- Ecosystem Committee, planning the future development of DLNA guidelines
- Compliance & Test Committee, overseeing the certification program and its evolutions
- Marketing Communication Advisory Council, actively promoting DLNA worldwide
- Technical Committee, writing the DLNA guidelines

On January 5, 2017, the DLNA organization announced, "The organization has fulfilled its mission and will dissolve as a non-profit trade association." Its certification program continues to be conducted by SpireSpark International of Portland, Oregon.

=== DLNA technology components ===
As the past president of DLNA pointed out to the Register in March 2009:

The vendors of software are allowed to claim that their software is a DLNA Technology Component if the software has gone through certification testing on a device and the device has been granted DLNA Certification. DLNA Technology Components are not marketed to the consumer but only to industry.

DLNA Interoperability Guidelines allow manufacturers to participate in the growing marketplace of networked devices and are separated into the following sections of key technology components:

- Network and Connectivity
- Device and Service Discovery and Control
- Media Format and Transport Model
- Media Management, Distribution and Control
- Digital Rights Management and Content Protection
- Manageability
- Efficient Power Management

== See also ==
- Consumer Electronics Control (CEC) – Allows audio/video equipment to cooperate through HDMI connections
- Devices Profile for Web Services
- DigiOn
- Digital Transmission Content Protection
- LiquidHD
- List of UPnP AV media servers and clients
- Comparison of UPnP AV media servers
- Miracast
- Universal Plug and Play § AV standards
- WiFi Direct
- Wireless HDMI
