= Debut Video Capture Software =

Computer software

Debut Video Capture and Screen Recorder
- Developer: NCH Software
Stable release
- Windows: 10.25 / 2 December 2024; 13 months ago
- macOS: 10.14 / 9 September 2024; 16 months ago
- Operating system: Windows XP and later Mac OS X 10.4.4 and later
- Size: 1.67 MB
- Available in: English, Spanish, German, French, Italian, Japanese, Korean, Dutch, Swedish, Chinese and Portuguese
- Type: video screen capture
- License: Trialware
- Website: www.nchsoftware.com/capture/index.html

Debut is a video capture and screencast program developed by NCH Software, available for Windows and macOS.

== Functionality ==
The user interface of Debut is divided into 4 major elements. These include a Main toolbar, Recording controls, Record as Section, and the Preview Area.

Debut integrates with other software developed by NCH Software such as VideoPad, Movie Maker, Prism Video Converter and Express Burn Disc Burning Software.

== Input types ==
Debut is capable of recording video from various sources, including an external recording device, a computer screen, a webcam, or streaming video. Debut combines two applications – screen recording and video capture from webcams and external inputs.

== Controversy and criticism ==
In the past, NCH Software applications downloaded Ask and Chrome Toolbars by default, triggering malware warnings from companies like McAfee and Norton. According to NCH Software, their software has not bundled the toolbars since July 2015, and are now certified safe by anti-virus companies like Norton and McAfee.

A class-action lawsuit was filed against NCH Software in April 2016 relating to security vulnerabilities in the 2015 version of the program. The case was later dismissed.

== See also ==
- Comparison of screencasting software
