= Mantle (API) =

Low-overhead rendering API

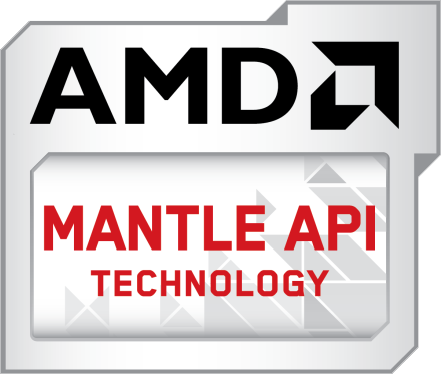
- Developers: AMD, DICE
- Release: September 25, 2013; 12 years ago
- Operating system: Windows
- Platform: x86 and x86-64
- Successor: Vulkan
- License: Proprietary, freeware
- Website: www.amd.com/mantle

Mantle was a low-overhead rendering API targeted at 3D video games. AMD originally developed Mantle in cooperation with DICE, starting in 2013. Mantle was designed as an alternative to Direct3D and OpenGL, primarily for use on personal computers. In 2015, Mantle's public development was suspended and in 2019 completely discontinued, as DirectX 12 and the Mantle-derived Vulkan rose in popularity.

== Overview ==
The draw call improvements of Mantle help alleviate cases where the CPU is the bottleneck. The design goals of Mantle are to allow games and applications to utilize the CPUs and GPUs more efficiently, eliminate CPU bottlenecks by reducing API validation overhead and allowing more effective scaling on multiple CPU cores, provide faster draw routines, and allow greater control over the graphics pipeline by eliminating certain aspects of hardware abstraction inherent to both current prevailing graphics APIs OpenGL and Direct3D.

=== CPU-bound scenarios ===
With a basic implementation, Mantle was designed to improve performance in scenarios where the CPU is the limiting factor:

- Low-overhead validation and processing of API commands;
- Explicit command buffer control;
- Close to linear performance scaling from reordering command buffers onto multiple CPU cores;
- Reduced runtime shader compilation overhead;
- AMD claims that Mantle can generate up to 9 times more draw calls per second than comparable APIs by reducing CPU overhead;
- Multithreaded parallel CPU rendering support for at least 8 cores.

=== GPU-bound scenarios ===
Mantle was also designed to improve situations where high resolutions and "maximum detail" settings are used, although to a somewhat lesser degree, as these settings tax GPU resources in a way that is more difficult to improve at the API level. While Mantle provides some built-in features to improve GPU-bound performance, gains in these cases are largely dependent on how well Mantle features and optimizations are being utilized by the game engine. Some of those features include:

- Reduction of command buffers submissions
- Explicit control of resource compression, expands and synchronizations
- Asynchronous DMA queue for data uploads independent from the graphics engine
- Asynchronous compute queue for overlapping of compute and graphics workloads
- Data formats optimizations via flexible buffer/image access
- Advanced Anti-Aliasing features for MSAA/EQAA optimizations
- Native multi-GPU support

=== Benchmarks ===
- Performance superior to Direct3D 11
- Improved performance in Battlefield 4 and up to 319% faster in the Star Swarm demo in single GPU configuration in extremely CPU-limited situations.

=== Other claims ===
- Easier to port from Mantle to Direct3D 12 than from Direct3D 11 to Direct3D 12
- At GDC 14 Oxide Games employee Dan Baker stated that Mantle would address fundamental development challenges that could not be addressed by a retrofit of an existing API. It is hard to optimize for the graphics device driver.
- At the AMD Developer Summit (APU) in November 2013 Johan Andersson, technical director of the Frostbite engine at DICE praised Mantle for making development easier and enabling developers to innovate.
- Mantle targets 100K
- Monolithic Pipeline
- Pipeline saving and loading
- Hybrid Resource Model
- Generalized Resources
- Control over resource preparation
- Dynamic flow control without CPU intervention
- Direct GPU control
- Reduced runtime shader compilation overhead
- Better control over the hardware.
- "All hardware capabilities are exposed through the API."
- Reduction of command buffer submissions
- Data formats optimizations via flexible buffer/image access
- Explicit control of resource compression, expansion, and synchronization
- Asynchronous DMA queue for data uploads independent from the graphics engine
- Asynchronous compute queue for overlapping of compute and graphics workloads
- New rendering techniques

== Support ==
The Mantle API was only available as part of AMD Catalyst prior to 19.5.1, which was available for Microsoft Windows. AMD promised to support their Mantle API only for their graphics cards and APUs which are based on their Graphics Core Next microarchitecture, but not older products based on the TeraScale microarchitecture. As of July 2014 the implementation of the Mantle API was available for the following hardware:

- certain Radeon HD 7000 series GPUs
- certain Radeon HD 8000 series GPUs
- certain AMD Radeon Rx 200 series GPUs ("R7" and "R9")
- all Steamroller-based "Kaveri" APUs: AMD A10-7000 series and AMD A8-7000 series
- all Jaguar-based "Kabini" and "Temash" APUs: AMD E1-2000 series, E2-3000 series, A4-1200 series, A4-1350, A4-5000 series, A6-1450, A6-5200, Sempron 2650, Sempron 3850, Athlon 5150, Athlon 5350, etc.
- all Puma-based "Beema" and "Mullins" APUs: E1 Micro-6200T, A4 Micro-6400T, A10 Micro-6700T, E1-6010, E2-6110, A4-6210, A6-6310, etc.

Mantle was originally planned to be released on other platforms than Windows, including Linux, but it never happened.

While the API was officially discontinued, Clément Guérin started a Mantle to Vulkan translation layer called GRVK in mid 2020. This allows the API and ultimately the games to live on even without Mantle supporting graphic drivers.

=== Game engines ===
- At GDC 2014, Crytek announced they will support Mantle in their CryEngine.
- During a GPU 14 Tech Days presentation, an announcement was made that Frostbite 3 would include a Mantle backend.
- The Nitrous game engine from Oxide Games, alongside DirectX 12. Mantle benchmark is still available in a free Star Swarm stress test.
- Thief is based on a modified Unreal Engine 3 that supported Mantle.
- LORE, a Civilization: Beyond Earth engine supported Mantle.
- Asura, engine used by Sniper Elite III supported Mantle.

=== Video games ===
- Battlefield 4
- Battlefield Hardline
- Thief (2014)
- Plants vs. Zombies: Garden Warfare
- Civilization: Beyond Earth
- Dragon Age: Inquisition
- Sniper Elite III

==== Originally planned ====
- Star Citizen
- 15 Frostbite games after Battlefield 4 were planned to support Mantle, potentially including Need for Speed Rivals, Mass Effect: Andromeda, Mirror's Edge Catalyst, The Sims 4 and Star Wars Battlefront (2015).
- There have been rumours about other games from that time, including Call of Duty: Advanced Warfare, Dying Light, Grand Theft Auto V and Rise of the Tomb Raider potentially supporting Mantle, but these reports were not confirmed.

== Similar technologies ==
A set of recent OpenGL 4.4 features, coupled with bindless texturing as an extension, can also substantially reduce driver overhead. This approach, termed by the Khronos Group as "AZDO" (Approaching Zero Driver Overhead) has been shown to achieve substantial performance improvements, approaching those stated for Mantle. Nvidia has extended OpenGL with a number of features that further reduce driver overhead.

After details about DirectX 12 were made public, AMD has stated that they fully intend to support DirectX 12, but at the same time they claimed that Mantle "will [still] do some things faster." They have also claimed that due to similarities in the design philosophy of the two APIs, porting games from Mantle to DirectX 12 will be relatively straightforward, and easier than porting from DirectX 11 to 12.

Ultimately, AMD discontinued Mantle as a game API due to the similar aims of DirectX 12 and glNext (later renamed Vulkan). AMD donated the Mantle API to the Khronos group, which developed it into the Vulkan API.

== Comments ==
Much of the work that drivers used to do on an application’s behalf is now the responsibility of the game engine. ... It also means that this work, which must still be done, is done by someone with considerably more information. Because the engine knows exactly what it will do and how it will do it, it is able to make design decisions that drivers could not.

— Firaxis on 2014-04-28, Why We Went With Mantle

== Recording and FPS overlay software ==
PC gamers and professionals traditionally used programs such as Fraps and Bandicam to record gameplay, measure game FPS and display FPS overlay, but because Mantle is new, most traditional recording software does not work with new titles while using the new API.

In partnership with AMD, PC gaming community and game recording software maker Raptr have overhauled their client and have since re-branded it as the AMD Gaming Evolved client in conjunction with AMD's Gaming Evolved initiative in the PC gaming space. Out of the partnership, players who install and use the client while in-game can earn points to spend on digital items like games or computer hardware, chat with friends, keep their game library optimized, check for graphics card driver updates, stream their games to Twitch and record gameplay of their own with a built-in GVR, a feature similar to Nvidia Shadowplay software in its own GeForce Experience software that allows users to define a custom buffer length in their game for retroactive game recording with the push of a button so no moment gets missed and users typically do not need expensive hard drive setups to record to. In late 2014, AMD updated the client to support the recording and streaming of titles using Mantle. As of its initial update into the client, the Gaming Evolved software was the only software to officially support the recording and streaming of Mantle enabled games.

Besides Raptr, D3DGear was the only other commercial game recording software that supported Mantle API based games.

== See also ==
- Direct3D 12 – low-level API from Microsoft
- Vulkan – low-overhead API from Khronos, developed from Mantle
- Glide – another low-level API, by the now defunct 3dfx
- GNM – low-level API of the PlayStation 4
- GNMX – high-level API of the PlayStation 4
- Metal – low-level API for Apple iOS and macOS
