= Adobe Presenter =

Educational software by Adobe Systems

- Logo
- Developer: Adobe Systems
- Initial release: August 8, 2008; 17 years ago
- Stable release: 11.1.0.189 / August 17, 2017; 8 years ago
- Operating system: Microsoft Windows, macOS
- Available in: 8 languages
- List of languages English, French, German, Japanese, Korean, Portuguese (Brazilian), Spanish, Arabic
- Type: Presentation software, Screencasting and video editing software
- License: Proprietary, software as a service
- Website: adobe.com/presenter

Adobe Presenter is eLearning software released by Adobe Systems available on the Microsoft Windows platform as a Microsoft PowerPoint plug-in, and on both Windows and OS X as the screencasting and video editing tool Adobe Presenter Video Express. It is mainly targeted towards learning professionals and trainers. In addition to recording one's computer desktop and speech, it also provides the option to add quizzes and track performance by integrating with learning management systems. Adobe Presenter was designed to replace the discontinued Adobe Ovation software, which had similar functions.

== Predecessor ==
Adobe Ovation was originally released by Serious Magic. It converted PowerPoint slides into visual presentations with additional effects. Ovation included themes called PowerLooks that could add motion and polish the presentations. They were available in a variety of color variations complete with animated backgrounds and dynamic text effects. Ovation could make text with jagged edges more readable. TimeKeeper could be used to set the period of the presentation, and the PointPrompter scrolled down the notes.

Ovation's development has been discontinued, nor does it support PowerPoint 2007.

== Features ==
The main purpose of Adobe Presenter is to capture on-screen presentations and convert them into more interactive and engaging videos. Support is given to convert Microsoft PowerPoint 2010 and 2013 presentations into videos. It also allows for content authoring on PowerPoint and ActionScript 3, and offers integration with Adobe Captivate. Slide branching enables users to control slide navigation and titles and create complex slide branching to guide viewers through the content of the presentation.

Video editing tools are also provided, and offer the ability to upload to video-sharing platforms such as YouTube, Vimeo and other sites. Multimedia features such as annotations, eLearning templates, actors, audio narration and drag-and-drop elements enrich users' presentations. Quizzes and surveys is another highlighted feature, which include generating question pools, importing questions from existing quizzes and in-course collaboration which allows presenters to receive feedback by allowing them to comment on specific content within a course or ask questions for more clarity.

Presenters could opt to receive feedback from viewers through video analytics and create Experience API, SCORM and AICC-compliant content. Options to publish to Adobe Connect are provided. Other unique features include universal standards support, file size control, navigational restrictions among others.

== See also ==
- Comparison of screencasting software
