= Comparison of screencasting software =

This page provides a comparison of notable screencasting software, used to record activities on the computer screen. This software is commonly used for desktop recording, gameplay recording and video editing. Screencasting software is typically limited to streaming and recording desktop activity alone, in contrast with a software vision mixer, which has the capacity to mix and switch the output between various input streams.

== Comparison by specification ==
| Product name | Publisher | Latest stable version | Latest release date | OS | Software license | Source code available? |
|---|---|---|---|---|---|---|
| Adobe Captivate | Adobe Systems | 12.3 | 2024-04-02 | Windows macOS | Proprietary commercial | No |
| Adobe Presenter Video Express | Adobe Systems | 12.0.2.170 | 2017-11-28 | Windows macOS | Proprietary commercial | No |
| AVS Video Editor | Online Media Technologies Ltd | | | Windows | Commercial | No |
| Bandicam (Windows) | Bandicam Company | 8.3.0 | 30 December 2025 | Windows | Freemium commercial | No |
| Bandicam (Mac) | Bandicam Company | 26.3.0 | 2026-03-27 | macOS | Freemium commercial | No |
| BB FlashBack | Blueberry Software | v5.60 | 2023-08 | Windows | Proprietary commercial | No |
| BB FlashBack Express | Blueberry Software | v5.60 | 2023-08 | Windows | Freeware | No |
| CamStudio | CamStudio.org | 2.7.4 r354 | 2016-08-10 | Windows | GPL | Yes |
| Camtasia (Windows) | TechSmith | 2025.0.1 | 2025-03-25 | Windows | Proprietary commercial | No |
| Camtasia (Mac) | TechSmith | 2025.0.3 | 2025-04-08 | macOS | Proprietary commercial | No |
| CloudApp | CloudApp | 6.1 | 2020-07-13 | Windows macOS; Linux | Freemium | No |
| Debut (Windows) | NCH Software | 10.25 | 2024-12-02 | Windows | Trialware | No |
| Debut (Mac) | NCH Software | 10.14 | 2024-09-09 | macOS | Trialware | No |
| Fraps | Beepa Pty Ltd | 3.5.99 | 2013-02-26 | Windows | Proprietary commercial | No |
| Freeseer | FOSSLC | 3.0.1 | 2014-01-03 | Windows macOS; Linux | GPL-3.0-or-later | Yes |
| HyperCam | Solveig Multimedia | 7.0.2603.06 | 2026-03-06 | Windows | Proprietary commercial | No |
| HyperCam | Hyperionics | 2.29.00 | 2016-01-07 | Windows | Freeware | No |
| Microsoft Expression Encoder | Microsoft | 4 | 2011-11-02 | Windows | Freeware | No |
| Nero Vision | Nero AG | 2025 | 2024-10-09 | Windows | Proprietary commercial | No |
| Nvidia Shadowplay | Nvidia | 2.11.4.0 | 2016-06-21 | Windows | Proprietary (Part of NVIDIA GFE) | No |
| Open Broadcaster Software (OBS Studio) | OBS Project | 32.1.0 | 2026-03-08 | Windows macOS; Linux | GPL-2.0-or-later | Yes |
| Peek | Philipp Wolfer | 1.5.1 | 2020-02-19 | Linux | GPL-3.0-or-later | Yes |
| Pixetell | Ontier Inc. | 1.3.14599 | 2010-07-29 | Windows | Proprietary commercial | No |
| QuickTime X | Apple Inc. | 10.0 (118) | 2010-03-29 | macOS | Proprietary (Part of macOS) | No |
| RecCloud | WANGXU TECHNOLOGY | 1.5.5 | 2025-09-26 | Windows | Freemium commercial | No |
| recordMyDesktop | SourceForge | 0.4.0 | 2021-03-14 | Linux | GPL-2.0-or-later & GPL-3.0-or-later | Yes |
| Screencam | SmartGuyz Inc. | 3.3.0 | 2009-03-24 | Windows | Proprietary commercial | No |
| ScreenPal | ScreenPal | 3.14.3; 3.14.3 | 2024-12-02; 2024-12-02 | Windows macOS | Freemium | No |
| ScreenFlow | Telestream | 10.5.1 | 2025-11-18 | macOS | Proprietary commercial | No |
| ShareX | Jaex and Michael Delpach | 19.0.2 | 2026-01-18 | Windows | GPL v3 | Yes |
| SimpleScreenRecorder | maartenbaert | 0.4.4 | 2021-05-24 | Linux | GPL-3.0-or-later | Yes |
| Snagit (Windows) | TechSmith | 2026.0.0 | 2026-01-14 | Windows | Proprietary commercial | No |
| Snagit (Mac) | TechSmith | 2026.0.0 | 2025-12-16 | macOS | Proprietary commercial | No |
| Snapz Pro X | Ambrosia Software | 2.6.1 | 2016-10-17 | macOS | Proprietary commercial | No |
| VirtualDub | SourceForge | 1.10.4.35491 | 2013-10-27 | Windows | GPL-2.0-or-later | Yes |
| VLC media player | VideoLAN | 3.0.18 | 2022-11-08 | Windows macOS; Linux; BSD; Solaris; QNX; Haiku; Syllable; OS/2 | LGPL-2.1-or-later | Yes |
| Xbox (Game DVR) / Xbox Game Bar | Microsoft | | | Windows | Freeware | No |
| XSplit Broadcaster | SplitmediaLabs | 4.5.2412.0304 | 2024-11-08 | Windows | Shareware | No |
| Product name | Publisher | Latest stable version | Latest release date | OS | Software license | Source code available? |

== Comparison by features ==
The following table compares features of screencasting software. The table has seven fields, as follows:

1. Product name: Product's name; sometime includes edition if a certain edition is targeted
2. Audio: Specifies whether the product supports recording audio commentary on the video
3. Entire desktop: Specifies whether product supports recording the entire desktop
4. OpenGL: Specifies whether the product supports recording from video games and software that employ OpenGL to render digital image
5. Direct3D: Specifies whether the product supports recording from video games or software that employ Direct3D to render digital image
6. Editing: Specifies whether the product supports editing recorded video at least to some small extent, such as cropping, trimming or splitting
7. Output: Specifies the file format in which the software saves the final video (audio output types are omitted)

| Product name | Audio | Entire desktop | OpenGL | Direct3D | Editing | Output |
|---|---|---|---|---|---|---|
| Adobe Captivate | Yes | Yes | ? | ? | Yes | SWF, EXE, MP4 |
| Adobe Presenter Video Express | Yes | Yes | ? | ? | Yes | MP4 |
| Bandicam (Windows) | Yes | Yes | Yes | Yes | No | Video: AVI, MP4; Images format:BMP, PNG, JPEG; Audio: WAV, MP3 |
| Bandicam (Mac) | Yes | Yes | Yes | Yes | Yes | Video: MOV, MP4; Audio: M4A |
| BB FlashBack | Yes | Yes | ? | ? | Yes | AVI, FLV, SWF |
| BB FlashBack express | Yes | Yes | ? | ? | No | AVI, FLV, SWF, MP4 (H.264 or MPEG-4 ASP), WMV, Animated GIF, PowerPoint slideshow, self-extracting EXE |
| CamStudio | Yes | Yes | ? | ? | Yes | AVI, SWF |
| Camtasia (Windows) | Yes | Yes | Yes | Yes | Yes | Video: MP4, MP4 embedded in webpage (HTML5), WMV, AVI, Animated GIF; Images format: PNG, JPEG, GIF, BMP; Audio: WAV, MP3, M4A (audio-only MP4) |
| Camtasia (Mac) | Yes | Yes | Yes | Yes | Yes | Video: MP4, MP4 embedded in webpage (HTML5), MOV, Animated GIF; Images format: PNG; Audio: WAV, M4A (audio-only MP4) |
| CloudApp | Yes | Yes | No | No | Yes | ? |
| Debut | Yes | Yes | ? | ? | Yes | AVI, FLV, MKV, MP4, WebM, WMV, 3GP, ASF, DV, MOV, MPG, OGV |
| FFmpeg with a plug-in | Depends | Depends | Depends | Depends | No | cf. FFmpeg § Codecs, formats and protocols supported |
| Fraps | Yes | Yes | Yes | Yes | No | FPS1 in AVI |
| Freeseer | Yes | Yes | ? | ? | No | Ogg |
| HyperCam | Yes | Yes | ? | ? | No | AVI, WMV |
| Jing | Yes | Yes | ? | ? | No | SWF |
| Microsoft Expression Encoder | Yes | Yes | Yes | No | Yes | |
| Nero Vision | Yes | ? | ? | ? | Yes | |
| Nvidia Shadowplay | Yes | Yes | No | Yes | No | Video: MP4; Image sequence: PNG |
| Open Broadcaster Software | Yes | Yes | Yes | Yes | No | Simple mode: FLV, MP4, MOV, MKV, TS, HLS; Advanced mode: Any format supported by libavformat |
| Pixetell | Yes | Yes | Yes | Yes | Yes | |
| QuickTime X | Yes | Yes | ? | ? | No | |
| recordMyDesktop | Yes | Yes | ? | —N/a | No | Theora in Ogg |
| Screencam | Yes | Yes | Yes | Yes | Yes | |
| ScreenPal | Yes | Yes | Yes | Yes | Yes | Video: MP4, FLV, AVI. Animated GIF; Audio: WAV; Images format: PNG, JPEG, TIFF, GIF, BMP; Optical character recognition (OCR): simple text |
| ScreenFlow | Yes | Yes | Yes | —N/a | Yes | ProRes, MP4, GIF, AAC |
| ShareX | Yes | Yes | No | No | No | AVI, MP4, GIF |
| SimpleScreenRecorder | Yes | Yes | Yes | —N/a | No | Formats supported by libavformat |
| Snagit (Windows) | Yes | Yes | Yes | Yes | Yes | Video: MP4, Animated GIF; Images format: PNG, JPEG, TIFF, GIF, WebP, BMP; Documents: PDF; Optical character recognition (OCR): simple text |
| Snagit (Mac) | Yes | Yes | Yes | Yes | Yes | Video: MP4, Animated GIF; Images format: PNG, JPEG, TIFF, GIF, WebP, HEIF, BMP; Documents: PDF; Optical character recognition (OCR): simple text |
| Snapz Pro X | Yes | Yes | ? | ? | No | |
| VirtualDub | Yes | ? | ? | ? | Yes | AVI |
| VLC | Yes | Yes | Yes | ? | Yes | |
| Windows Media Encoder | Yes | Yes | ? | ? | No | |
| Xbox (Game DVR) /Xbox Game Bar | Yes | No | ? | ? | No | MP4 |
| XSplit Broadcaster | Yes | Yes | Yes | Yes | Yes | MP4, FLV |
| Product name | Audio | Entire desktop | OpenGL | Direct3D | Editing | Output |

== See also ==
- Comparison of webcam software
- Remote desktop software
- Lecture recording
