= RecordMyDesktop =

Computer program

recordMyDesktop
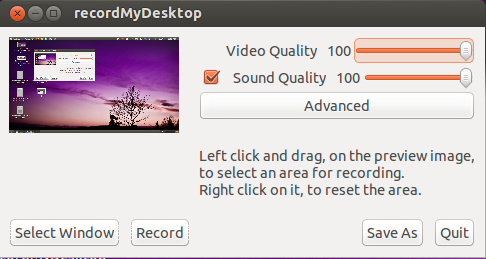
- gtkRecordMyDesktop main screen
- Original author: Ioannis Varouchakis (credited as John Varouhakis)
- Developers: Ioannis Varouchakis, Martin Nordholts
- Stable release: 0.4.0 / 14 March 2021
- Repository: github.com/Enselic/recordmydesktop
- Written in: C
- Operating system: Linux
- Type: Screencasting software
- License: GNU General Public License
- Website: github.com/recordmydesktop/recordmydesktop

recordMyDesktop is a free and open source desktop screencasting software application written for Linux.

The program is separated into two parts; a command line tool called recordmydesktop, licensed under GPL-2.0-or-later, that performs the tasks of capturing and encoding, and front-ends that exposes the program functionality graphically.

There are two front-ends written in Python: gtk-recordmydesktop which is licensed under GPL-2.0-or-later, and qt-recordymydesktop which is licensed under GPL-3.0-or-later.

recordMyDesktop also offers the ability to record audio through ALSA, OSS or the JACK audio server. RecordMyDesktop only outputs to Ogg using Theora for video and Vorbis for audio.

== See also ==
- Comparison of screencasting software
- Screencast
- SimpleScreenRecorder
