= Virtual photography =

Form of new media art

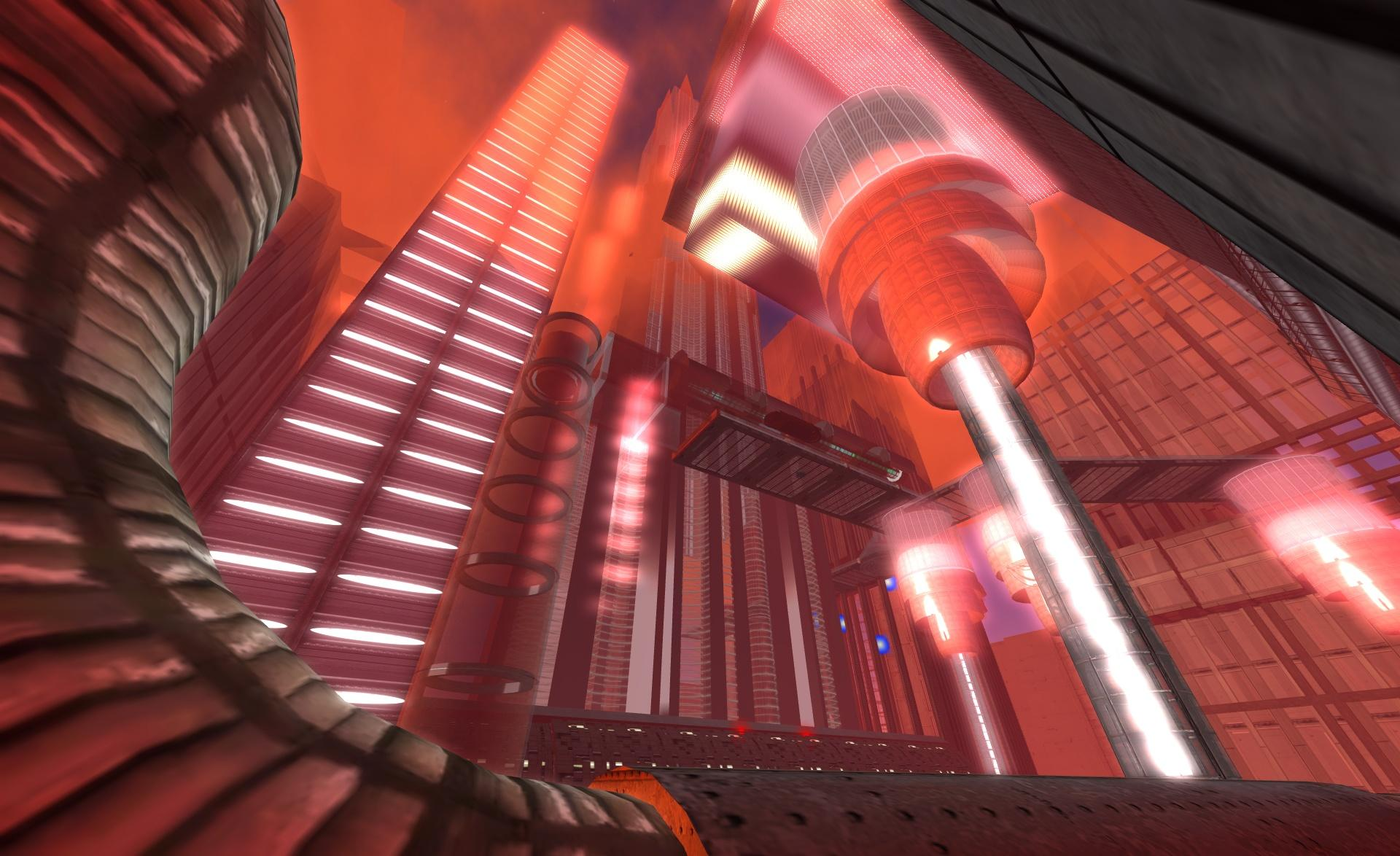
Virtual photograph in Second Life

Virtual photography is a form of new media art where images are created by taking screenshots of video games or other virtual worlds. Virtual photography has been featured in physical art galleries around the world. The validity and legality of this art form is sometimes questioned, because virtual photographers are taking photos of artwork created by the game's designers and artists. For the most part, virtual photographers share the same motivations as "real life" photographers, including a desire to capture visually interesting images, preserve memories, and demonstrating technical expertise.

One of the earliest known works of virtual photography was Thirteen Most Beautiful Avatars by Eva and Franco Mattes. It was exhibited in the virtual world of Second Life in 2006. The exhibit featured photographs of Second Life avatars set in a virtual art gallery. However, Metal Gear Solid: Integral released in 1999 featured a photo mode, separate from the game itself, where one can take pictures of certain characters, although it is unknown if the images could be exported. Gran Turismo 4, released in 2004, is the earliest known video game to include a photo mode that allowed players to export images.

In May 2016, Nvidia unveiled Ansel, a software development kit which allows game developers to add a free camera mode designed to simplify virtual photography. Ansel also made it possible to take 360-degree photos that could be viewed in virtual reality, such as with Google Cardboard. The development kit was added to The Witcher 3: Wild Hunt in August 2016. As of February 2022, Ansel is no longer supported by Nvidia.

Virtual photographers are sometimes described as virtual tourists, since their focus is photographing games rather than playing them. Because virtual worlds often feature tourist attractions in-game, such as beaches, golf courses and recreations of landmarks, a visit may be considered a form of vacation.

As video game graphics have become increasingly photorealistic and many new games feature photo modes designed for virtual photography, such as Red Dead Redemption 2 released in 2018 and The Last of Us Part II from 2020, the form has increased in popularity. Virtual photography was added as a separate category on image hosting site Flickr in September 2022, distinguishing these images from other screenshots.

In 2016, the Fotomuseum Winterthur in Switzerland was one of the first art centers to feature virtual in-game photography. They showcased Kent Sheely's work, a veteran digital artist that took pictures within the DoD series from the video game, Day of Defeat: Source.

== Notable artists ==
Duncan Harris, the curator of Dead End Thrills – a website dedicated to in-game screenshots – says that “a good screenshot is a liar by omission”. Harris is English, studied engineering at the university level, and prides himself in being from a Britsoft background. His technique, which he has been developing since he founded Dead End Thrills in 2008, is based in tweaking and modding games to make them as photogenic as possible. In 2012, he received an advance build of Dishonored so that he could showcase its virtual world before it was released. He was an advisor for Nvidia in developing Ansel.

Leo Sang is best known for his Backseats in Games collection, which features black and white photographs taken from Project CARS and WCR 3. His technique includes the use of Fraps, post-processing, and sometimes a phone or camera. Sang started a Tumblr page in 2011, which holds more than 470 images. He added grain to his photographs to achieve a look closer to that of 35mm film. Both Sang's and Harris' work have been hung in physical art galleries in Los Angeles and London.
