= Peek (software) =

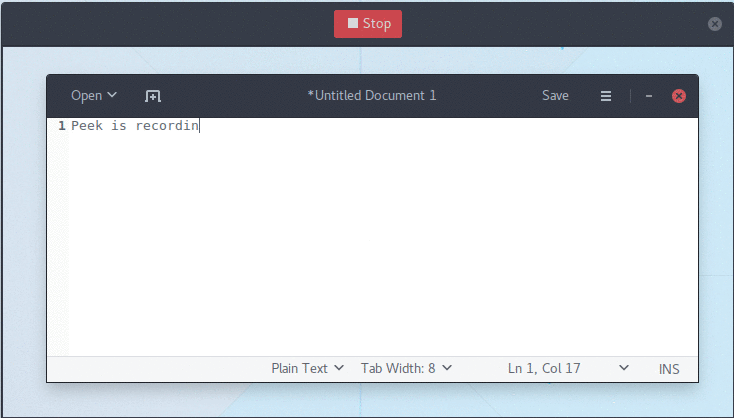
- Peek on Linux
- Developer(s): Philipp Wolfer, Alessandro Toia
- Initial release: 2015
- Stable release: 1.5.1 / 19 February 2020
- Repository: github.com/phw/peek
- Written in: Vala
- Operating system: Linux
- Available in: Multilingual
- License: GPL-3.0-or-later
- Website: https://github.com/phw/peek

Peek is a computer software program for Linux to create simple animated GIF file based on the GIF89a file format. A screencast is created from a user-defined screen area. Peek is optimized for generating animated GIFs, but can also directly record to WebM or MP4.

Peek is not a general purpose screencast app with extended features but rather focuses on the single task of creating small, silent screencasts of an area of the screen for creating GIF animations or silent WebM or MP4 videos.

Peek runs on X11 or inside a GNOME Shell Wayland session using XWayland.

Peek has been featured in Issue 206/2018 of the Linux Magazine.

On January 14, 2023, peek was declared deprecated.

== See also ==
- Screencast Software
- Comparison of screencasting software
