= ScreenFlow =

- Developers: Telestream, Inc.
- Initial release: February 2008; 18 years ago
- Stable release: 10.5.1 / 18 November 2025
- Operating system: macOS Sequoia and later
- Type: Screencasting
- License: Proprietary commercial software
- Website: www.telestream.net/screenflow/overview.htm

ScreenFlow from Telestream, Inc. is a screencasting and video editing software for the macOS operating system. It can capture the audio and video from the computer, edit the captured video, add highlights or annotation, and output a number of different file types such as AIFF, GIF, M4V, MOV, and MP4.

Version 5 added the support of video and audio capturing from a connected iPhone, iPod touch, or iPad.

Version 9 of ScreenFlow was released on November 12, 2019 as a direct purchase from Telestream, Inc and via the Mac App Store.

== Major Release Dates ==
Version	Date
10	June 22, 2021
9	November 12, 2019
8	August 1, 2018
7	August 1, 2017
6	June 1, 2016
5	October 21, 2014
4	October, 2012
3	August 10, 2011
2	October 26, 2009
1	February, 2008

== Awards ==
ScreenFlow won the Editors' Choice Award from Macworld in December 2012.

ScreenFlow won an Eddy Winner award from Macworld in December 2008.

== See also ==
- Comparison of screencasting software
