= Pixetell =

- Developer: Ontier Inc.
- Final release: 1.3.14599 / 29 July 2010
- Operating system: Create on Microsoft Windows; Play on Windows, Mac OS X, Linux
- Platform: Microsoft Windows, Mac OS X, Linux
- Available in: English
- Type: Asynchronous Collaboration, Screen capture
- License: Commercial (21-day free trial)
- Website: Pixetell.com (offline as of 2012)

Pixetell was an online communication and collaboration tool for producing and sharing screencasts, or short videos that present the contents and activity on their computer screen. Its developer, Ontier Inc., was acquired in 2011, but it was not publicly disclosed what company acquired Ontier and its product Pixetell. The service was discontinued in May 2011.

Pixetell screencasts could be combined with audio voice-over, existing video files and webcam recordings to present information to the person viewing the recording; attachments may be added and sent as part of the message. The software permitted people to communicate asynchronously; as with email, the producer and the viewer did not need to be online at the same time; but as with remote desktop software, it was possible to provide detailed demonstrations of computer-based tasks.

Pixetell production software was available only for Microsoft Windows; the recordings were displayed in Flash format, and viewable from Windows, Mac OS X, and Linux.

Files could be attached to Pixetell messages and existing video could be edited into a Pixetell message.

As is the case with some other screen recording and screencasting software products, Pixetell's software could be used to create messages that demonstrate software features and critiques of digital documents. The messages had applications in customer service, document editing, sales, training and education. The messages could be sent by email or embedded in web pages, documents, and social media sites. They also had applications in training and education such as professional development, inter-school communication, parent/teacher communication, and project collaboration.

== See also ==
- Collaborative software
- Comparison of screencasting software
- Distance education
- Multimodal interaction
- Instructional design
