= ShareX =

Free and open-source screenshot and screencast software

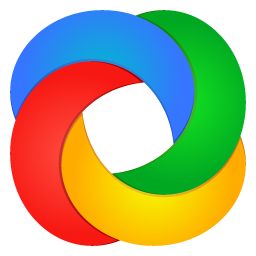

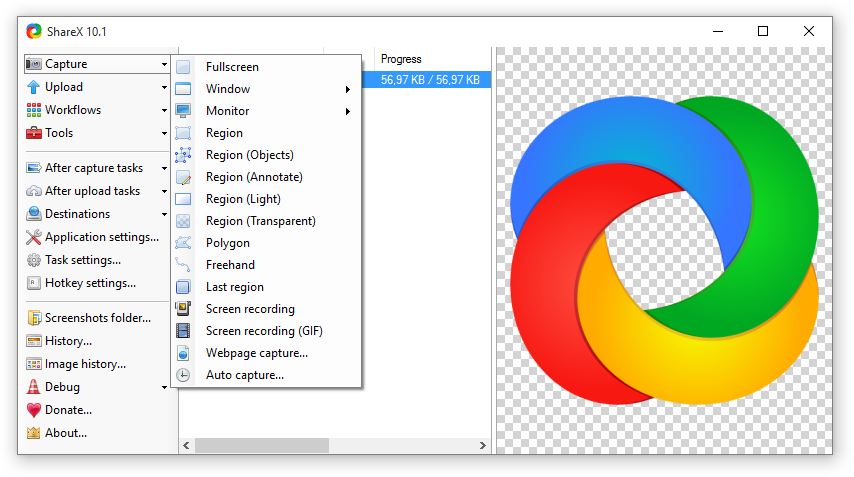
- Developer: ShareX Team
- Initial release: 22 August 2007; 18 years ago
- Stable release: 19.0.2 / 18 January 2026; 60 days ago
- Written in: C#
- Operating system: Windows 10 or later
- Platform: .NET 9.0
- Available in: 13 languages
- List of languages English, Dutch, French, Italian, German, Hungarian, Korean, Portuguese, Russian, Simplified Chinese, Spanish, Turkish, Vietnamese
- Type: Screenshot software, screencast software, raster graphics editor, file verifier
- License: GNU GPLv3
- Website: getsharex.com
- Repository: github.com/ShareX/ShareX

ShareX is a free and open-source screenshot and screencast software for Windows. It is published under the GNU General Public License. The project's source code is hosted on GitHub. It is also available on the Microsoft Store and Steam.

== Features ==
=== Screenshots ===
ShareX can be used to capture full screen or partial screenshots (which can be exported into various image formats), such as rectangle capture and window capture. It can also record animated GIF files and video using FFmpeg.

An included image editor lets users annotate captured screenshots, or modify them with borders, image effects, watermarks, etc. It is also possible to use the editor to draw on top of the windows or desktop before taking the screenshot.

=== Sharing ===
After capture, a screenshot can be automatically exported as an image file, email attachment, exported to a printer, to the clipboard, or uploaded to a remote host via FTP. Many popular image and cloud hosting services support ShareX integration, and some offer scripts to automatically upload using an account. If the image is uploaded to a remote host, the URL generated by it can be copied to the clipboard.

Dragging other file types into the program will upload them to a destination based on type, such as a text file being saved to Pastebin and a ZIP file saved to Dropbox.

=== Other tools ===
There are a variety of desktop image capabilities including screen color picker and selector, checksum tool (hash check), on-screen ruler, image combiner, thumbnails for images and video, and many more.

The program also includes some basic automation. For example, taking a screenshot, adding a border and watermark, and then saving to a specific folder.

== Development ==
Work on a project called ZScreen began in 2007, hosted on SourceForge and moved to Google Code in 2008. In 2010, a parallel project called ZUploader was started to rewrite ZScreen's core from scratch. In 2012, all of ZScreen's features had been ported to ZUploader which was subsequently repackaged and released as ShareX. In 2013, the project was moved to GitHub due to Google Code dropping support for hosting downloads.

== Reviews ==
- TechRadar gave the program 4.5 out of 5 stars and listed it among their 2021 Best Screen Recorders.
- The Guardian's 2018 article on the "best replacement for the Windows 10 Snipping Tool" lists ShareX first, with the caveat that it's powerful and probably "overkill for most users".
- The Verge's article listed ShareX among the 2021 great apps to have for Windows 11.
- Lifehacker made a 2022 article about ShareX being the Best Screenshot Tool for Windows with a complete usage guide.
- Microsoft listed ShareX as the best Utility App in the 2022 Microsoft Store Community Choice Awards.

== See also ==
- Comparison of screencasting software
