= InvestedIn =

Crowdfunding website

- Website type: Crowd funding
- Available in: English
- Headquarters: Santa Monica, United States
- Website: investedin.com
- Commercial: Yes
- Launched: 2010; 16 years ago
- Current status: Offline

InvestedIn was a crowd funding website for fund raising projects and charity events such as walkathons and celebrity cause-based campaigns. The company was also a technology provider offering a white label crowdfunding platform for commercial and non-profit use.

== History ==
InvestedIn was founded in 2010 by Alon Goren and Yadid Ramot. The company launched the service at the DEMO conference Founder Alon Goren used crowdfunding on stage sponsor their trip to the conference. InvestedIn raised $45,000 after being accepted to the AmplifyLA accelerator program.

== Model ==
One of a number of fundraising platforms dubbed "crowd funding," the consumer facing website from InvestedIn allowed any individual to create a fundraising project. InvestedIn did not limit the kinds of project they accepted, unlike other platforms such as Kickstarter. Project creators could choose from two campaign types, "tipping point" campaigns where they set a goal, only receiving funds when their project meets or exceeds that goal, and "deadline" campaigns where they try raise as much money as they can during a limited time frame. Funds were collected via credit card payment through a merchant processor.

InvestedIn collected 3% of any funds raised after a project becomes successful. The merchant processing provider used by InvestedIn also charged a percentage of 3-4% depending on the type of card used.

== White Label Crowdfunding Platform ==
In addition to operating a crowd funding website, InvestedIn also offered a technology solution to companies interested in operating their own crowdfunding website. Based on a client's needs, InvestedIn built new features based on client specifications and needs buid them a unique platform. Numerous companies and non-profits have engaged InvestedIn for their websites, including BoostFunder and BizWorld.

The company worked with multiple companies to open crowdfunding portals for equity under the JOBS Act.

== Accolades and news coverage ==
Covered in The Wall Street Journal for work in niche crowdfunding. Also covered in The Pacific Coast Business Times.

Awarded "Best Marketplace Platform Funding Award" March 2012 by the Los Angeles Venture Association.

== See also ==
- Comparison of crowd funding services
