= Adobe Presenter Video Express =

Screencasting and video editing software

- Adobe Presenter Video Express 11
- Developer: Adobe Systems
- Stable release: 12.0.2.170 / November 28, 2017
- Operating system: Windows, OS X
- Available in: 8 languages
- List of languages English, French, German, Japanese, Korean, Portuguese (Brazilian), Spanish, Arabic
- Type: Screencasting and video editing software
- License: Proprietary, software as a service
- Website: adobe.com/presenter-video-express

Adobe Presenter Video Express is screencasting and video editing software developed by Adobe Systems.

== Description ==
Adobe Presenter Video Express is primarily used as a software by video creators, to record and mix webcam and screen video feeds. It allows users to simultaneously record video from their webcam and the screen, and easily mix the 2 tracks with a simple user interface.

Users can change the background in their recorded video without needing equipment like a green screen. This is unlike other video tools which rely on chroma keying technology, and only work with green or blue screens.

They can also add annotations and quizzes to their content and publish the video to MP4 or HTML5 formats.

== List of notable features ==
=== Record and mix, screen and webcam ===
Support for simultaneous recording of screen and webcam video feeds, with a simple editing interface to mix the two video streams. This lets the author rapidly create screencasts, software demos, etc.

=== Make my background awesome ===
This feature allows authors to change the background of their webcam recording without needing a green screen, provided they use a solid-colored backdrop which contrasts well against them. Authors can select images, videos or even the screen recording as their background.

=== In-video quizzing ===
Authors can insert quizzes within their video content. On success/failure attempts, the author can decide what message to display, and can also configure the video to jump to a certain point and play. Quizzes are published as part of the interactive HTML 5 player, which cannot be hosted on YouTube and Vimeo.

=== LMS Reporting ===
Authors can publish to any SCORM compliant LMS (Learning Management System) for quiz reporting, or to Adobe Captivate Prime.

=== In-app assets and branding ===
Adobe Presenter Video Express ships with a large number of branding videos, backgrounds and video filters to help authors create studio quality videos.

=== MP4 and HTML5 Output ===
The tool publishes a single MP4 video file containing all the video content, within an HTML 5 wrapper that contains the interactive player. The interactive HTML 5 player can be hosted on any website.

== Common uses ==
=== Screencasting ===
Screencasting is the process of recording one's computer screen as a video, usually with an audio voice over, to create a software demonstration, tutorial, presentation, etc. Adobe Presenter Video Express supports simultaneous recording of full screen video and microphone audio for creating screencasts.

=== Product marketing and demos ===
The ability to record the webcam video in addition to everything that is visible on the screen in Adobe Presenter Video Express, allows the author to add their personality to their screencasts. Features like video mixing and 'make my background awesome' further enhance the presentation, allowing effortless creation of marketing and demo videos.

=== Education ===
Adobe Presenter Video Express supports in-video quizzes and LMS reporting, along with screencasting and webcam recording. These features make it a powerful tool for creating educational content.

== Differences from Adobe Presenter and Adobe Captivate ==
Adobe Presenter is a Microsoft PowerPoint plug-in for converting PowerPoint slides into interactive eLearning content, available only on Windows. Starting with Adobe Presenter 8, the video creation tool Adobe Presenter Video Express was bundled with every purchase of Adobe Presenter. From September 2015, Adobe Presenter Video Express 11 was also made available as a stand-alone product on Windows and Mac. A subscription license for Adobe Presenter Video Express, valid on Windows and Mac, is available for $9.99/month. Adobe Presenter Video Express continues to be bundled with purchases of Adobe Presenter on Windows as well.

Adobe Captivate is an authoring tool for creating numerous forms of interactive eLearning content. Unlike Adobe Presenter, it uses a proprietary editing interface instead of Microsoft PowerPoint. While it is possible to create screen captures with Adobe Captivate, you cannot record the webcam feed. Adobe Captivate does not bundle Adobe Presenter or Adobe Presenter Video Express.

== See also ==
- Adobe Presenter
- Comparison of screencasting software
