= Voxeet =

VoIP web conferencing software

- Industry: Software
- Founded: 1 January 2009
- Headquarters: Sausalito, San Francisco
- Key people: Stephane Giraudie, Larry Fornallaz, Benoit Senard
- Website: www.voxeet.com

Voxeet was a VoIP web conferencing software that used 3D high definition voice technology to produce immersive sound. It was available for Windows, iPhone and Android. In 2012, it won the DemoGod Award at DEMO Spring '12. On April 1, 2019 Dolby Labs acquired Voxeet for an undisclosed amount.

== Technology ==
Voxeet advertised itself as using technology that addressed the limitations of traditional conferencing software by using multiple microphones to reproduce natural location mechanisms. Voxeet's approach aimed to create a virtual 3D audio space that made listening easier and less taxing, citing the cocktail party effect for its functionality.

== Features ==
Voxeet allowed up to 8 participants to have online conferences with high definition voice and 3D sound on Windows computers, and iPhone and Android phones. Participants used headsets to experience immersion. The system provided:

- VoiP HD 3D Sound
- Visual Cues to know who is speaking
- Mobile phone integration with one-click transfer
