= HyperCam =

Screen recording software

- Developers: Hyperionics & Solveig Multimedia
- Release: January 8, 1997; 29 years ago
- Stable release: 7.0.2603.06 / 6 March 2026; 8 months ago
- Operating system: Microsoft Windows
- Type: Screencasting software
- License: Proprietary software
- Website: www.solveigmm.com/en/products/hypercam/

HyperCam is a screencasting program made by Hyperionics and Solveig Multimedia. It captures the action from a Microsoft Windows screen and saves it to an AVI (Audio Video Interleaved) or WMV (Windows Media Video) or ASF (Advanced Systems Format) movie file. HyperCam will also record all sound output, and sound from the system microphone can also be recorded. The software was known for having a popular free version with a distinctive watermark that encouraged paying for the full version.

== Features ==
HyperCam is primarily intended for creating software presentations, tutorials, demonstrations, walkthroughs, and other various tasks the user wants to demonstrate. The latest versions also capture overlay video and can re-record movies and video clips (e.g. recording videos playing in Windows Media Player, RealVideo, QuickTime, etc.). Beginning with version 3.0, HyperCam also includes a built-in editor for trimming and merging captured AVI, WMV, ASF files.

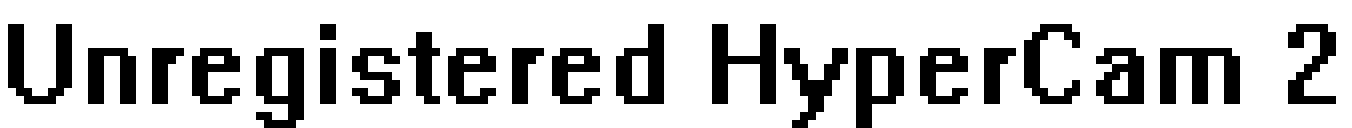
Unregistered HyperCam 2's watermark

The unregistered versions of HyperCam apply a digital watermark to the upper-left corner of each recorded file and will ask the user to register on every startup. Base registration, which costs $39.95, will eliminate this watermark.

In April 2004, HyperCam 2 was released.

In April 2009, Solveig Multimedia released HyperCam 3.

In May 2010, Hyperionics published an update that made HyperCam 2 available completely free for "world-wide use", removing the digital watermark. However, HyperCam 3 and beyond continue to have the watermark.

== See also ==
- Comparison of screencasting software
- Bandicam
- Fraps
