= Freeseer =

Cross-platform screencasting application suite

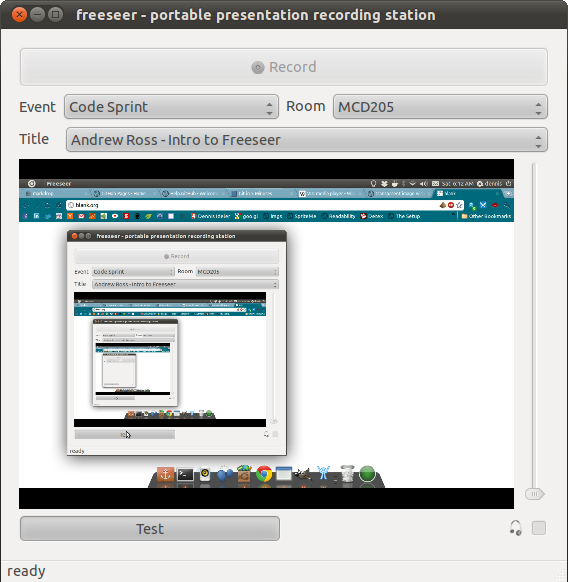
- Freeseer 2.5.3 performing a test screencast on Ubuntu
- Original author: FOSSLC
- Developers: Thanh Ha, Andrew Ross
- Initial release: January 2010; 15 years ago
- Stable release: 3.0.1 / 3 January 2014
- Repository: github.com/freeseer/freeseer
- Written in: Python
- Operating system: Linux, Windows (additional software needed), OS X (not fully supported)
- Platform: Qt4, GStreamer
- Available in: English, German, French, Dutch, Chinese, Japanese
- Type: Screencasting software
- License: GPL-3.0-or-later
- Website: freeseer.readthedocs.org

Freeseer (/ˈfriːsiːɑːr/) is a discontinued cross-platform screencasting application suite released as free and open-source software. Freeseer is a project of the Free and Open Source Software Learning Centre (FOSSLC), a not-for-profit organization.

== Purpose ==
Its primary purpose is conference recording and has been used at conferences like OSGeo's FOSS4G, FSOSS, and more. The software renders videos in an Ogg format. Its video source options are USB (e.g. internal/external webcam) or desktop. Freeseer consists of three different dependent programs: a recording tool (which is the main tool), a configuration tool, and a talk-list editor.

== History ==
Since 2008, FOSSLC has been recording open source events around the world. To reduce recording costs, gain more control over the recordings, and achieve a more portable recording solution, FOSSLC began investigating alternatives and in-house options.

In 2009, Freeseer was developed to make recording video extremely easy. Its primary goal was to make recording large conferences with many talks possible on a frugal budget and ensure recordings are high quality. Freeseer began as a proof of concept when a command line hack using strictly open source components was used to record video from a vga2usb device and audio from a microphone.

On May 28, 2022, the Freeseer project page on GitHub was archived, indicating no further development was to be expected.

== Features ==
- Configuration tool
- Video & audio recording
- Supports basic keyboard shortcuts
- Talk editor for managing talks to be recorded
- Uses a plug-in system so developers can easily add new features
- Video & audio streaming (RTMP streaming support and Justin.tv plug-in)
- Report editor for reporting issues with recorded talks
- Configuration profiles
- Multiple audio input
- YouTube uploader

== See also ==
- Comparison of screencasting software
