= Save22 =

Singaporean shopping application

- Developer: BOB FTW PTE LTD
- Release: 2010
- Stable release: 1.1.0 on Android; 2.0.1 on iOS
- Written in: Objective C, Java, Python
- Operating system: Android, iOS
- Size: 4.4 MB on Android; 1.9 MB on iOS
- Available in: English
- Type: Shopping
- License: Free
- Website: www.save22.com

Save22, formerly known as Lobangclub, is a Singaporean web and mobile shopping app that scans products and finds local stores selling that product. The iPhone app version of Save22 (then known as Lobangclub) won Asia's Most Valuable App 2011 Award at Singtel TechVenture.

By 2012, the app has been number 1 in its category in the App Store and has expanded to the Philippines, Malaysia and Singapore.

Save22 is cross platform, it is currently available on iOS and Android devices.

== History ==
The company was founded by Guyi Shen with co-founders Ronald Cheung and Jeremy Foo, the app was originally named Lobangclub. The name was later changed due to an unexpected meaning of the world lobang in Bahasa Indonesian. The company is headquartered at NTU in Singapore, with its main work campus in Manila, Philippines.

== Investments ==
Save22 has received an undisclosed sum of funding from Crystal Horse Investments and MDA.

== Controversy ==
CEO Guyi Shen was featured on the reality TV Show Angel's Gate and appeared to agree on a mentoring relationship with two of the angels on the show for 10% equity in the company.This agreement was widely ridiculed as an example of investors taking advantage of entrepreneurs in the Singapore startup ecosystem. It later was revealed that the agreement never progressed beyond the TV studio.

== Features ==
The app allows user to scan items at home or in store to find similar products in nearby stores and compare prices. This can also be done with a name search. Users can also add new products to the database thus incrementally building a bigger listing of products.

== Public reception ==
The app was judged Asia's most valuable App 2011 by Singtel Techventure. Subsequently, the company was invited to launch the app at the inaugural DEMO Asia 2012.

The Straits Times reviewed the app and called it a "Must Have".

The app maintains a 3.5 out of 5 stars rating in the App store and a 5 out 5 stars rating in the Play Store.
