= FlashBack Pro =

- FlashBack v5
- Developer: Blueberry Software Limited
- Stable release: v5.60 / August 2023; 2 years ago
- Written in: C++
- Platform: Microsoft Windows
- Type: Screencasting software
- License: Proprietary software Standard edition: Commercial; Express edition: Freeware
- Website: www.flashbackrecorder.com

FlashBack Pro is a Windows-based screen recording program, distributed by Blueberry Software Limited. It allows the user to add text effects, cut and paste movie footage and edit mouse movements. Recordings are initially saved in a proprietary format which can be opened and edited in the associated editor. Once editing is complete they can be exported to Flash, AVI, and a variety of other formats. A PowerPoint plug-in is also deployed with the program's installer. A freeware version of this program was released in April 2009.

The development company that makes the program began in 1997 as Blueberry Consultants, a software development company producing tailor-made software projects. In summer 2003, Blueberry Software Limited was created and released the first version of BB FlashBack.

== Features ==
In October 2014, Blueberry Software launched FlashBack Pro 5, which adds the ability to record a video once and release it in multiple languages; a magnifier effect to enlarge parts of the movie; password protection for recordings; and a new user interface, and easier sharing via integration with a new dedicated online video sharing website – FlashBack Connect.

New features in FlashBack Pro 5 are:

1. Features to enable localization of movies.
2. Magnifier effect to enlarge parts of the movie.
3. Password protection for recordings that need to be kept secure.
4. Dedicated online video sharing website – FlashBack Connect, with customization options for marketing/branding movie pages.
5. New Graphical User Interface.
6. Team License option to eliminate the need to buy multiple licenses in an organization.

Other features include:

1. Fade Transitions: For adding transition effects to join clips when creating a movie.
2. Gallery: A gallery of in-movie objects like textboxes, images, highlights etc.
3. Blur Tool: For blurring out sensitive details in a movie.
4. Notes to Textboxes: Converts notes made during recording into movie textboxes.
5. Export to GIF Format: For easy embedding into Web pages.
6. Arrow tool: The Arrow tool can create a number of arrow styles by selecting from a combination of key properties.
7. Watermarks: For adding branding to the movie.
8. Start and End Titles: For adding start and end titles to a movie.
9. Insert video files: For adding a video file to add interest or clarify a point.
10. Invisible Keystrokes: Displays invisible keystrokes such as function keys, so that the viewer can see exactly what a user did during recording.
11. Scheduled Recording: For recording webinars and other online events.
12. Text Formatting: Controls text formatting in text boxes.
13. Export To Apple Devices: Exports movies in a format compatible with Apple devices.
14. Precision Sound Editing: Inbuilt sound editing, with tracks shown as waveforms.
15. Webcam and Picture-in-Picture Video: For creating "talking head" presentations and picture-in-picture video.
16. Pause Objects: Create pauses in the movie by adding pause objects rather than by inserting frames.
17. Recording wizard: A step-by-step guide for beginners.
18. Highlight tool: Used to draw viewer's attention to key sections of the screen.
19. Mouse movement correction: To re-record mouse actions into smooth, 'straight-line', flowing movements.
20. Highlight tool: Used to draw viewer's attention to key sections of the screen.

== File format ==
FlashBack Movie
- Filename extension: .fbr
- Open format?: no
- Website: www.flashbackrecorder.com

FlashBack files have default file extension as FBR, which stands for "FlashBack Recording." A FBR file is a multimedia container format which includes the recorded screen and separate audio tracks (i.e. desktop audio, microphone). Standard FlashBack video is based on lossless GDI video but can be converted in the editor to lossy MPEG-4 format to reduce size.

== Other software ==
Flashback SDK add screen recording, playback, editing and exporting to any application. ActiveX/COM objects that integrate with MS Visual Studio and Borland IDEs.

TestAssistant screen-recorder for software testing. Capture a screen to make movies of any defects.

Flashback Rewind perpetual screen-recording so when a bug occurs users can press the icon in the system tray and share the last few minutes of their screen with others.

FBX screen-recording designed for use with high frame rate applications such as gaming.

== See also ==
- Comparison of screencasting software
