= Zight App =

Video and image sharing platform

Zight
- Other names: CloudApp
- Original author: Max Schoening
- Developer: Zight
- Release: 2010; 16 years ago
Stable release
- Windows: 6.3 / March 11, 2021; 5 years ago
- macOS: 6.5.0 / February 26, 2021; 5 years ago
- iOS: 1.4.0 / December 10, 2020; 5 years ago
- Chrome Web Store: 5.7.17 / February 16, 2021; 5 years ago
- Platform: Microsoft Windows, MacOS, Linux, iOS, Chrome Web Store
- Available in: English
- Type: Screenshot software, screencast software
- License: Freemium
- Website: zight.com

Zight, previously known as CloudApp, is a cross-platform screen capture and screen recording desktop client that supports online storage and sharing.

Zight full and partial screen recordings export to .mp4 format. Full or partial screen image captures export to either JPG or PNG format. Additionally, Zight can create GIFs, annotate images and videos, and upload and store files.

== History ==
CloudApp was initially launched in 2010 as a project by Max Schoening (former lead designer at Heroku). Originally, it enabled knowledge workers to instantly share screenshots and file assets as short links that didn't require a download to view. The project then moved towards visual collaboration to allow sharing screenshots, gifs, annotations, and screen recordings. The first iteration included a downloadable Mac application and accompanying free service.

CloudApp was later acquired by Aluminum.io and Xenon Ventures in January 2014, where Tyler Koblasa became General Manager and CEO. In June 2016, Koblasa secured US$2 million in a funding round led by Tikhon Bernstam, founder of Scribd and Parse, and Kyle York (CSO Dyn), which enabled him to acquire the intellectual property from Aluminum.io, invest in the platform and add founding team member Scott Smith to help scale the business.

In July 2016, CloudApp acquired the intellectual property for app Annotate, a popular Mac and iOS annotation app, from David Cancel and Elias Torres, of Boston-based Drift. In October 2019 it added collections and favorites to its platforms to allow teams and enterprises to share collections of videos, screenshots, and GIFs created with CloudApp.

In January 2020 it launched a new app to cover iPhones and iPads. In March 2020, it launched ‘Instant Video’, a new video streaming service, that uploads videos while the user captures them to make sharing instantaneous. CloudApp has been listed five quarters in a row on G2's top consumer reviewed products lists.

in April 2023, CEO Scott Smith announced the rebranding from CloudApp to Zight.

== Features ==
=== Video ===
- Full screen, screen only, optional audio
- Full screen, window-in-window webcam, optional audio
- Full screen, webcam only, optional audio
- Selected region, screen only, optional audio
- Selected region, window-in-window webcam, optional audio
- Supports real-time video annotation
- Start/pause/resume controls
- End of life*

=== Image ===
- GIF creation
- Full screen capture
- Partial screen capture
- Delayed screenshot
- Supports image annotation

=== Browser view ===
- Share via link, email, social
- Support embedded media
- Permissions management
- Organize in collections
- Comments

== Integrations ==
CloudApp integrates with Zendesk, Jira, Trello, Zapier, the Google Workspace, GitHub, Asana, Slack, several Freshworks products, and the Zoho Office Suite.

== Platform support ==
CloudApp supports Linux, macOS, and Windows with a downloaded client. It also enables mobile screen recording with a native iPhone app. CloudApp has a Chrome browser extension listed in the Chrome Webstore.

== See also ==
- Snipping Tool
- Comparison of screencasting software
