= Screencam =

SmartGuyz Screencam
- A screenshot of SmartGuyz ScreenCam
- Developer(s): SmartGuyz Corporation
- Stable release: 3.6.0 / 20 December 2012; 12 years ago
- Operating system: Microsoft Windows
- Type: Screencasting
- License: Proprietary commercial software
- Website: www.smartguyz.com

ScreenCam (formerly Lotus/IBM ScreenCam) is a screencast tool for Microsoft Windows that is used to author software demonstrations, software simulations, branched scenarios, and tutorials in .swf (also known as Adobe Flash) format. ScreenCam was primarily targeted at users who need to create video-oriented instructional materials who were not multimedia authors or video capture technicians. It was very easy to use, having a 'VCR-like' interface and requiring no knowledge of digital video editing, or the concept of 'frames' of a movie, because it used a different paradigm for creating the screen movies. It can also be used for creation of screencasts and conversion of Microsoft PowerPoint presentations to the Adobe Flash format.

== History ==
ScreenCam was originally produced in the early 90s and received good reviews compared to other technologies of the time. It was considered one of the earliest screencasting products commercially available in the 1990s, and was popular for streaming and broadcasting of screen demos and tutorials at that time.

ScreenCam utilized the concept of intercepting and storing Video Procedure Calls (VPCs) in Windows 95 using a proprietary capture extension which invasively intercepted VPCs as the operating system generated them. These VPCs were stored in a proprietary format and a player which generated a 'movie' of what was recorded by sending these same VPC calls to the operating system created a very lifelike playback of the recorded screen. It was considered very clever at the time, and put the concept of screen recording and software simulation on the map in the computing world. Although some other commercial software did similar things, especially on Unix workstations, the widespread adoption of Windows 95 went a long ways to establishing ScreenCam's dominance in this area. Eventually, ScreenCam was acquired by IBM when the company purchased Lotus Corporation, and ScreenCam's programmers kept doing minor updates to the product line. This technique worked well enough that a 2003 PC Magazine review gave ScreenCam good marks even after IBM/Lotus stopped supporting newer OSes. However, problems began to surface in trying to bring the technology forward.

As Microsoft Windows matured and spread, the "VPC capture" design started to show its age, and programs that invasively intercepted procedure calls became difficult to support. The technique was also problematic when a ScreenCam movie was moved to a computer which was missing fonts and icons that existed on the OS which was recorded. Since the playback OS was missing these fonts and icons, the playback OS would substitute fonts and icons, making the playback messy and inaccurate. ScreenCam files, which were really a storage mechanism for VPCs, was difficult to edit, and featured limited interactivity and web browser compatibility. IBM did move to support Windows NT 4.0, but eventually IBM decided to not pursue the screen capture software business any further, and the brand name "ScreenCam" was acquired by SmartGuyz Incorporated, a private software developer.

SmartGuyz subsequently released a completely new ScreenCam program, based not on VPC capture, but on periodic capture of the screen and cursor position, an integrated editor, and export to known standard video and graphics formats. This ameliorated the problems caused by capturing and playing back VPCs, and allowed ScreenCam an upgrade path to newer OSes and the Internet.

== Modern version ==
The current version of ScreenCam builds and edits interactive software demonstrations, simulations, podcasts, screencasts, and program demos. For software demos, it records in real time using a proprietary capture algorithm that captures a sequence of still images and then builds mouse movement simulations to create the appearance of a running program. By using Adobe Flash Tweening technology, ScreenCam is able to create screencasts in a smaller file size than by using typical video compression technology. In particular, the system can use tweening to simulate cursor movement without needing to use delta-frame codecs on the entire video frame.

ScreenCam users can edit ScreenCam presentations to add clickable buttons, captions and callouts, graphical items like colored shapes and arrows, clickable hotspots, text entry boxes, etc. Authors can edit the content (including mouse pointer path, position, image) and change the timing for each item to appear and disappear. The hotspots can branch to other sections in the presentation, or to outside webpages. It has an interface which is heavy on use of graphics and tends to follow the concept of a movie editor. It supports the concept of merging movies, splitting movies, and deleting sections of ScreenCam movies.

ScreenCam supports import of still images and audio tracks into the ScreenCam's editor. It can export to Adobe Flash .swf format, .avi format and animated GIF. When exporting to .swf it will automatically generate an .html file, facilitating the placement of the paired .swf and .html files onto a website for viewing. ScreenCam will also 'wrap' an Adobe Flash player around an .swf file, turning it into a .exe file, which can be played without needing to have the Adobe Flash player installed on a computer.

== Versions ==
- SmartGuyz ScreenCam 3.6 (December 2012) Release to support Windows 7 with latest service pack and Windows 8. Stability enhancements and bug fixes.
- SmartGuyz ScreenCam 3 (March 2009) New features including rewrite for Windows Vista and Windows XP (including 64-bit versions), support for SWF7 and large file exports, tweaks to the capture engine, in-editor (post video capture) audio dubbing, better playback controls, enhancements to word editor, cursor, note styles, GUI refresh.
- SmartGuyz ScreenCam 2 (January 2007) New features included Microsoft PowerPoint plug-in, allowed automated recording of Powerpoint slide shows.
- SmartGuyz ScreenCam 1 (November 2004) Initial release of ScreenCam by SmartGuyz, included concept of export to .swf, graphical timeline editing, editable 'tweened' cursor recording.
- IBM ScreenCam for Windows NT 4.0 (November 2004) Release of ScreenCam for Windows NT 4.0, after acquisition of Lotus by IBM.
- Lotus ScreenCam 2.0 for Windows (May 1995) 2nd major release of ScreenCam, included improved compression, integration with Lotus Notes/FX, captioning, ability to edit movie and soundtrack separately.
- Lotus ScreenCam 1.0 for Windows (April 1994) 1st major release of ScreenCam, it was included as part of Lotus 1-2-3 Multimedia package. Introduced notion of extremely simple VCR-controls, no knowledge of digital video editing or multimedia authoring was required. Ability to capture entire screen of activity with very smooth playback was 1st in the industry.

== See also ==
- Comparison of screencasting software
