= Express Zip =

Express Zip File Compression Software is a file compression and archiving software program developed by NCH Software for Windows and Mac OS first released in 2010. It offers the ability to open, manage, archive, extract, and compress digital documents into .zip, .tar, .tgz, .wim, .arj, and .lzh as well as additional archive formats. It also supports file zipping and unzipping, file compression, sending compressed files as attachments via email, and backing up files by burning them to compatible discs (CD/DVD).

Currently, the most popular version of Express Zip is version 2.28, which is installed across more than half of the user base. Most users are located in the United States, but it also has some presence in various countries across Europe and other regions.

== Features ==
Express Zip can open existing archive files, create new archives, add files or folders to an archive, remove files from an archive, open selected files, and convert existing archives into other archive file types. It can also be used to manage zip files by editing or moving their contents, adding password protection, or encryption.

Express Zip includes the ability to convert archives from other formats to ZIP as well as split large ZIP files into smaller ones with multi-part split ZIP archives. It supports opening an extracting a number of popular file archive formats including ZIP, RAR, .CAB, TAR, 7z, ISO, ZIPX, LZH, and ARJ.

== Controversy ==
For a time, Express Zip and a number of other NCH Software products came bundled with optional browser plugins like the Google Chrome toolbar and the Conduit toolbar. These caused users to complain and also triggered malware warnings from AV software companies such as Norton and McAfee. NCH Software has since removed all toolbars, browsers, and third-party app offerings in all Express Zip versions released from July 2015 onwards.

== See also ==
- 7-Zip
- List of archive formats
- Comparison of file archivers
