= ScreenPal =

US software company

- Original author: AJ Gregory
- Developer: ScreenPal
- Initial release: 2006
- Operating system: Microsoft Windows, macOS
- Platform: Microsoft Windows, macOS, iOS, Android
- Type: Screenshot software, Screencast software, Video editing software
- License: Freemium
- Website: https://screenpal.com

ScreenPal (formerly known as Screencast-O-Matic) is cross-platform screen capture and screen recording software originally developed in 2006.

== History ==
The company was founded by AJ Gregory in 2006 as Screencast-O-Matic. The software includes features for screen recording, screenshot capture, video editing, image editing, and a video and image hosting service. It is available for Windows and Mac operating systems, and has mobile apps for iOS and Android.

The company launched a video editor in 2015. It began offering free video and image hosting in 2019, with premium hosting options for subscribers.

In 2023, it was rebranded as ScreenPal.
