= SimpleScreenRecorder =

Qt based Simple Screen Recorder

- Original author: Maarten Baert
- Developer: Maarten Baert
- Stable release: 0.4.4 / 24 May 2021
- Repository: github.com/MaartenBaert/ssr
- Written in: C++
- Operating system: Linux, BSD, Unix-like
- Type: Screencasting software
- License: GPL-3.0-or-later
- Website: www.maartenbaert.be/simplescreenrecorder/

SimpleScreenRecorder is a Qt-based free and open source multithreaded screencast software made for Linux and Unix-like operating systems which can handle similar tasks FFmpeg/avconv and VLC does.

== Features ==
SimpleScreenRecorder can capture a video and audio recording of the entire computer screen or part of it or record OpenGL applications directly. The program reduces the frame rate of the video if the computer it is running on is too slow. The program can pause and resume recording by pressing a hotkey. The program also shows statistics about the computer's performance during recording. Users can select options for the screen capture such as "follow the cursor" and "record the cursor." SimpleScreenRecorder can output video and audio into many final file container formats. These video and audio encodings are also customizable. The resolution and frame rate of the resulting video may be set prior to recording, as may the audio quality of the video.

== See also ==
- Comparison of screencasting software
- Screencast
