= Camtasia =

Screen recording and video editing software

Camtasia 2023
- Camtasia

- Camtasia Recorder (Windows icon only)
- Developer: TechSmith
- Release: 2002

Stable release(s)
- Windows: 2025.0.1 (25 March 2025)
- Mac: 2025.0.3 (8 April 2025)
- Operating system: Windows, macOS
- Type: Screen recording and video editing software
- License: Proprietary software
- Website: techsmith.com

Camtasia ( /kæmˈteɪʒə/; formerly Camtasia Studio and Camtasia for Mac) is a product suite, created and published by TechSmith for screen recording and video editing. It is primarily used to create video tutorials, presentations, demonstrations, and other instructional or informational content.

== Products ==
The Camtasia Product Suite includes the Camtasia Editor (a desktop recorder/video editor for mac and windows) which is further described in this article, Camtasia Audiate (an AI audio editor and AI generative content), Camtasia Online (a free online screen recorder), and Camtasia Assets (a free/paid stock content library).

Other multimedia recordings (microphone, webcam and system audio) may be recorded at the same time or added separately (like background music and narration/voice tracks). Camtasia is available in English, French, German, Japanese, Portuguese, Spanish and Chinese versions.

A ChatGPT plug-in was added in September 2026 that can create AI-generated instructional videos from screenshots.

== Features ==
The features are structured around the three main steps of the program workflow: recording, editing and export/sharing.

=== Camtasia Recorder ===
In Camtasia Recorder, users can start and stop recording with shortcuts at any time, at which point the recording is halted, and Camtasia Recorder can render the input that has been captured into the TREC format. The TREC file can be saved to disk or directly imported into the Camtasia component for editing. Camtasia Recorder allows audio (and webcam) recording while screen recording is in progress, so the presenter can capture live narration during a tutorial or presentation. Camtasia also supports dubbing in other audio tracks or voiceover during post-capture editing. Windows users may also install an add-in for Microsoft PowerPoint that will allow them to initiate recording of a presentation from within PowerPoint itself.

=== Camtasia Editor ===
In the Camtasia Editor, the Media Bin is where media (screen recordings, voice-overs, etc.) for the current project are stored. The Library stores reusable media across multiple projects. On the Timeline, overlays of various types like annotations may be added, including user-defined settings, such as when and how to display the cursor and pan-and-zoom effects such as the Ken Burns effect. In order to provide localized versions of the produced videos, subtitles can be added with the captioning feature.

The Camtasia Editor allows import of various types of video, audio and image files including MP4, AVI, MP3, WAV, PNG, JPEG, and other formats into the Camtasia proprietary TREC format, which is readable and editable by the Camtasia Editor. The TREC file format (using TSC2 Codec) is a single container for various multimedia objects including video clips, images, screen captures and audio/video effects. On computers where Camtasia is not installed, you can download the TSC2 Codec for free to play TREC files.

The produced video can be exported as a local file: MP4, animated GIF, AVI (Windows version only), MOV (Mac version only), or uploaded directly to a media or file-sharing platform (YouTube, Google Drive, etc.).

By default, Camtasia projects are stored as standalone projects in .tscproj format (cross-platform file format).

== See also ==
- Comparison of screencasting software
- Distance education
- Instructional design
- Podcast
