= Adobe Connect =

Software for remote connectivity

- Original author: Macromedia
- Developer: Adobe
- Stable release: 12.3 / April 2023; 3 years ago
- Operating system: Windows macOS; Web
- Type: Collaborative software Web conferencing
- License: Trialware
- Website: adobeconnect.com

Adobe Connect (formerly Presedia Publishing System, Macromedia Breeze, and Adobe Acrobat Connect Pro) is a software suite for remote training, web conferencing, presentation, and desktop sharing. All meeting rooms are organized into 'pods'; with each pod performing a specific role (e.g. chat, whiteboard, note etc.). Adobe Connect was formerly part of the Adobe Acrobat family and has changed names several times.

== History ==
The product was first developed by a startup called Presedia and included a first generation PowerPoint-to-Flash Plugin (which then became Adobe Presenter) and a training module. Macromedia acquired Presedia and added on a real-time web conferencing component, called Breeze Live (later renamed Breeze Meeting).

In version 5, Macromedia Breeze included four applications: Breeze Presenter test, Breeze Training, Breeze Meeting, and Breeze Events (new in version 5). Following the acquisition by Adobe, Macromedia Breeze Meeting was initially rebranded to Adobe Connect, then Adobe Acrobat Connect Professional and later as Adobe Connect. The full product line includes rebranded versions of Breeze Training, Breeze Meeting, Breeze Presenter, and Breeze Events.

== Features ==
=== Contents of the suite ===
Adobe Connect includes the following applications:

- Adobe Connect Webinars (formerly Breeze Events)
- Adobe Connect Learning (formerly Breeze Training)
- Adobe Connect Meetings (formerly Breeze Presenter)

It can interoperate with Adobe Captivate, a rapid eLearning authoring tool with capability to publish directly the Connect server.

=== Capabilities ===
- Unlimited and customizable meeting rooms
- Multiple meeting rooms per user
- Breakout sessions within a meeting
- VoIP
- Audio and video conferencing
- Meeting recording
- Screen sharing
- Notes, chat, and whiteboards
- User management, administration, and reporting
- Polling
- Central content library
- Collaboration Builder SDK
- Mobile app (Android & iOS)
- HTML5 clients

== Version history ==
Adobe Connect Version History
Date released	Product version (service packs)	Applications
November 2021	Adobe Connect 11.4	New Features: Browser client for hosts and presenters; New meeting app for Windows; Enhanced audio; Greater accessibility: native closed captions; Separation of standard view and classic view; Compliance and control settings for account administrators; Screen sharing in a browser
November 2019	Adobe Connect 10.6	Watching recordings in HTML client and Connect Central curriculum improvements
July 2019	Adobe Connect 10.5	HTML client for participants and Connect Central improvements
December 2018	Adobe Connect 10.1	HTML Client improvements, Login Screen improvements and Connect Central web application improvements
October 2018	Adobe Connect 10.0	New HTML5 client (for attendees only), out of the box SAML 2.0 based single sign on capabilities, HD webcam capabilities
April 2018	Adobe Connect 9.8	New meeting entry workflows, continued HTML5 improvements to Connect Central, improved control over audio outputs
March 2018	Adobe Connect 9.7.5	New meeting entry workflows, continued HTML5 improvements to Connect Central, improved control over audio outputs
October 2017	Adobe Connect 9.7	New HTML5 interface for Connect Central, new desktop application
April 2017	Adobe Connect 9.6	Provides meeting hosts access to the engagement dashboard
June 2016	Adobe Connect 9.5.4	Improvements to the presenter only area for hosts
February 2016	Adobe Connect 9.5.2	Support HTML5 content from Adobe Captivate and Adobe Presenter in virtual classrooms, create offline MP4 versions recordings to support mobile devices, incorporate a new Adobe Connect SDK to add support for HTML5/Javascript versions of custom pods
September 2015	Adobe Connect 9.5	Support for HTML5 content within virtual classrooms, local MP4 conversion, updates to integration with Adobe Experience Manager, improvements to analytics dashboard
March 2015	Adobe Connect 9.4	
September 2014	Adobe Connect 9.3	Screen sharing improvements, whiteboard improvements, use Facebook or Google+ accounts to register for events, improved email reporting, integrations with Salesforce and Microsoft Lync
August 2013	Adobe Connect 9.1	Recording and playback enhancements, audio and video enhancements, event module enhancements, training module enhancements
2012	Adobe Connect 9.0	New Event Registration system and Large Webinar support
November 2010	Adobe Connect 8.0	TBD
November 2009	Adobe Connect 7.5 (SP1: April 2010)	Meeting, Training, Events, Adobe Presenter, Communication Server, Edge Servers
May 2008	Adobe Acrobat Connect Professional 7 (SP1: Dec 2008, SP2: Feb 2009, SP3: July 2009) (Note: "Professional" was later shortened to "Pro")	Meeting, Training, Events, Adobe Presenter, Communication Server, Edge Servers
December 2006	Adobe Connect 6 (SP1: Feb 2007 SP2: July 2007, SP3: Jan 2008)	Meeting, Training, Events, Adobe Presenter, Communication Server, Edge Servers (rebranded to Adobe)
May 2005	Macromedia Breeze 5 (SP1: Jan 2006, SP2: Mar 2006, SP2 Security Update: Oct 2006)	Meeting (formerly Breeze Live), Training, Events (new), Breeze Presenter, Communication Server, Edge Servers (new)
July 2003	Macromedia Breeze 4	Breeze Live (new), Training, PowerPoint Plug-In (rebranded Macromedia)
Unknown	Presedia Publishing System	Training, PowerPoint Plug-In

== See also ==
- Collaborative software
- Comparison of web conferencing software
- Microsoft Teams
- Videotelephony
