= XSplit =

Proprietary live-streaming software

- Developer: SplitmediaLabs
- Release: 13 April 2012; 14 years ago
- Stable release: 4.5.2508.1805 / August 18, 2025; 14 months ago
- Operating system: Microsoft Windows
- Available in: 10 languages
- Type: Livestreaming, screencast
- License: Proprietary
- Website: www.xsplit.com
- As of: June 13, 2016

XSplit is a proprietary live streaming and video-mixing application developed and maintained by SplitmediaLabs. It is mostly used for capturing gameplay for live streaming or video recording purposes. A Steam version was published by Devolver Digital on August 24 2016 and discontinued on Steam January 17 2018.

== Overview ==
There are two products published by SplitmediaLabs: XSplit Broadcaster and VCam.ai (Formerly XSplit VCam).

XSplit Broadcaster acts as a video mixer, where it is able to switch between various media configurations (also known as “scenes”) while dynamically mixing it with other sources such as video cameras, screen regions, game capture, and flash sources. These sources are used to create a broadcast production for both live and on-demand distribution on the web.

VCam.ai is used by streamers and professionals to remove and replace their webcam background.

== History ==
XSplit started in 2009 when SplitmediaLabs merged with Hmelyoff Labs. It was initially a screen capture product, which eventually became a livestreaming application and was called XSplit Broadcaster.

=== XSplit Broadcaster ===
In December 2010, SplitmediaLabs announced that XSplit would go into public beta. It was during this time that it gained popularity, largely due to word of mouth from its users. It was also widely discussed on the message board of Team Liquid, a professional electronic sports organization.

XSplit Broadcaster 1.0 was officially released on 13 April 2012, which formally marked the end of its public beta period. The release also marked the start of its freemium pricing scheme, which was met with mixed reactions.

Shortly before releasing XSplit Broadcaster version 1.1, SplitmediaLabs and AVerMedia made their partnership official. It centered around AVerMedia shipping three-month licenses of XSplit along with their Live Gamer HD C985 capture card.

In August 2012, XSplit 1.1 was released. It contained bug fixes, enhancements for existing features and introduced new features for paying users.

XSplit Broadcaster 1.2 became publicly available in January 2013. This update included enhancements in performance and support for new hardware devices such as Elgato Game Capture HD.

XSplit Broadcaster 1.3 was released in November 2013. This version contained security fixes to prevent login issues reported by some users. Apart from this, the update also contained full Twitch platform compatibility for all users, improved Game Source compatibility with games such as Battlefield 4, Call of Duty: Ghosts, Hearthstone, etc., and enhanced capture card support for AVerMedia, Hauppauge, Elgato, Matrox, and other cards.

=== XSplit Gamecaster ===
In December 2013, an early preview version of XSplit Gamecaster was shared to the public. In January 2014, a preview of XSplit Gamecaster was shared to members of the press, with a full version being made publicly available in February of that same year.

XSplit Gamecaster was initially only available to users who purchased a license for XSplit Broadcaster, however, a free version was added later on.

A partnership between MSI and XSplit was also established in March, where newly released MSI gaming hardware would feature XSplit Gamecaster pre-installed and configured.

XSplit Gamecaster laster launched in a new version on gamecaster.com. But was later sunset on March 31, 2023.

=== XSplit V2 ===
In the middle of November 2014, XSplit V2 was released to the general public. Prior to the release, users were only able to try out the public beta and report bugs through the support forum.

XSplit V2 which stands for XSplit version 2 was a major update for both XSplit Broadcaster and XSplit Gamecaster. Aside from the aesthetic improvements, the major change in this version was marked by making features that were previously only available to paid users also available to free users.

It also contained new features such as Scene Preview Editor, Express Video Editor, Audio Monitor, Web Page URL Source, etc.

=== Acquisitions ===
On 14 July 2016, SplitmediaLabs acquired tournament platform Challonge and social service Player.me, and acquired Strexm on 28 September 2016.
