= Guyi Shen =

Chinese entrepreneur (born 1979)

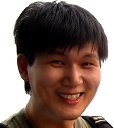
- Born: 8 March 1979 (age 47); Hangzhou, China
- Occupation: CEO of Save22

Guyi Shen (born 8 March 1979, in Hangzhou, China) is an entrepreneur best known as the founder and CEO of Save22, South-East Asia's largest mobile shopping application.

== Early life and education ==
Shen was born in Hangzhou, China on 8 March 1979. He spent his early years in London, Canada and Newcastle, New South Wales. He moved to Sydney, Australia in 1996 where he attended UNSW on a Co-Op Scholarship. He graduated in 2000 with a BSc in BIT.

== Career ==
Shen began his career at Procter & Gamble as a Lotus Notes programmer, he then went on to work at Westpac, Nortel Networks and IBM. In 2010, Shen moved to Singapore and founded Save22 with Ronald Cheung. Save22 is the largest mobile price comparison app in Southeast Asia.

== Television Work ==
Shen was featured in Episode 3 of the reality TV series Angel's Gate, which began broadcasting on Channel NewsAsia in February 2012. The show gives budding entrepreneurs in Asia an opportunity to pitch business ideas to investors. On the show, Shen agreed to a deal to exchange 10% of the company for mentorship. This agreement was widely ridiculed as an example of investors taking advantage of entrepreneurs in the Singapore startup ecosystem. It later was revealed that the agreement never progressed beyond the TV studio.
