= Nvidia ShadowPlay =

Hardware-accelerated screen recording utility

Nvidia ShadowPlay is a hardware-accelerated screen recording utility available as part of Nvidia's GeForce Experience and Nvidia App softwares for GeForce GPUs. Launched in 2013, it can be configured to record a continuous buffer, allowing the user to save the video retroactively. ShadowPlay is supported for any Nvidia GTX 600 series card or higher.

== Technical details ==
ShadowPlay can use two capture methods: Frame Buffer Capture (NVFBC) and Inband Frame Readback (NVIFR). NVFBC is used in full screen mode. NVIFR allows the capture of a single window instead of the whole framebuffer.

Once ShadowPlay captures a frame, it encodes it using a dedicated GPU hardware accelerated H.264 video encoder that records up to 4K resolution at 130 Mbit/s with minimal performance impact to the rest of the system. The bitrate can be set manually and ranges available depend on user screen resolution.

== Release ==
Nvidia ShadowPlay originated in a Nvidia Shield hardware-accelerated screen recording utility. It was set to release at the same time as the Nvidia Shield (June 2013) but was delayed and was pushed to being released during the summer of 2013 but was postponed again. On September 20, an Nvidia forum representative posted a thread to the GeForce forums, stating that the product was being delayed due to a problem with the video formats. It was released in a public beta on October 28, 2013 in the 331.65 driver.
