= Bandicam =

Screen capture and screen recording software

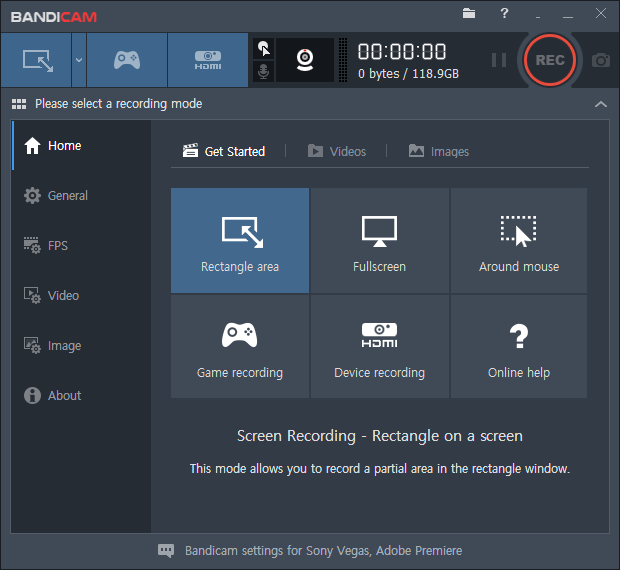
- Screenshot Bandicam Screen Recorder 5.0 screenshot
- Original author: Bandisoft
- Developer: Bandicam Company
- Release: April 23, 2009; 17 years ago
- Stable release: 8.3.0 / 30 December 2025
- Operating system: Microsoft Windows macOS
- Available in: Spanish, English, French, Turkish, Arabic, Indonesian, Portuguese, Russian, Japanese, Korean and German
- Type: Screencasting software
- License: Freemium
- Website: www.bandicam.com

Bandicam (stylized as BANDICAM) is a closed-source screen capture and screen recording software originally developed by Bandisoft and later by Bandicam Company that can take screenshots or record screen changes. Bandicam is available in Spanish, English, French, Turkish, Arabic, Indonesian, Portuguese, Russian, Japanese, Korean and German.

Bandicam consists of three main modes, those being a screen recording mode, which can be used for recording a certain area on the PC screen; a "Game Recording" mode, which can record a target created in DirectX, OpenGL, or Vulkan; and a "Device Recording" mode, which can record webcams and HDMI devices.

Bandicam displays an FPS count in the corner of the screen while the DirectX/OpenGL window is in active mode. When the FPS count is shown in green, it means the program is ready to record, and when it starts recording, it changes the color of the FPS count to red. The FPS count is not displayed when the program is recording in the Screen Recording mode. This software has a maximum frame rate of 480 FPS.

Bandicam is shareware, meaning that it can be tested free of charge with limited functionality (It is often called crippleware). The free version of Bandicam places the company's website as a watermark at the top of every recorded video, and each recorded video is limited to 10 minutes in length. The watermark is not visible during the video recording. However, users can adjust the screen margin with the video screen so that the watermark is off-screen from the video.

The created video can be saved in AVI or MP4 formats. Bandicam can also capture screenshots and save them as BMP, PNG, or JPG. Bandicam features an autocomplete recording mode which can limit the video capture process to a specified size or time value.

It supports hardware acceleration through Nvidia NVENC AV1/HEVC/H.264, CUDA, AMD APP AV1/HEVC/H.264 and Intel Quick Sync Video AV1/HEVC/H.264.

In July 2025, Bandicam Company released "Bandicam for Mac", expanding the software to macOS. The macOS version is distributed under a different licensing model from the Windows version.

== Online screen recorder ==
In 2026, Bandicam announced the launch of a browser-based free online screen recorder that allows users to capture their screen, webcam, and audio directly in a web browser without requiring a software download. According to a press release distributed via PRWeb, the web-based recorder offers Full HD recording without watermarks, processes recordings locally for privacy, and is compatible with multiple operating systems.

The Bandicam official navigation and the Free Screen Recorder site list this online recording option alongside Bandicam’s traditional desktop screen recording products, indicating that the company presents a browser-based tool as part of its screen capturing solutions.

== See also ==
- Crippleware
- Fraps
- HyperCam
- Comparison of screencasting software
