= Prism Video Converter =

- Developer(s): NCH Software
- Operating system: Windows macOS
- Type: Video editing software
- Website: www.nchsoftware.com/prism/index.html

Prism is a multi-format video converter developed by NCH Software for Windows and Mac OS. It offers converting tools for instant media conversions. Prism Video Converter can handle large and high-quality resolution media files. It provides built-in compressor and adjuster settings, allowing users to customize and optimize their videos according to their needs. The software also includes features such as previewing videos and adding effects. Prism offers a free version for non-commercial use as well as a premium version.

== Features ==
Prism Video File Converter supports a wide range of file formats. It enables users to convert videos into formats like AVI, ASF, WMV, MP4, 3GP, etc. It offers the ability to convert DVDs into various formats. It provides tools for adjusting colour and filter options.

Prism Video File Converter provides several customizable options for tweaking the output files during the conversion process. Users can adjust compression/encoder rates, set the resolution and frame rate, and specify the desired output file size. The software also offers various effects like video rotation, captions, watermarks, and text overlay.

It also includes a built-in preview feature, that enables users to view their videos before and after the conversion process. It supports batch conversion and running conversion in background.

== Controversy ==
Previously, Prism and certain other NCH Software products were bundled with optional browser plugins, including the Google Chrome toolbar and the Conduit toolbar. This resulted in user complaints and raised concerns from antivirus software companies like Norton and McAfee, which flagged them as potential malware. NCH Software has since removed all toolbars, browsers, and third-party app offerings in all Prism versions.

== See also ==
- Comparison of video converters
- Comparison of video editing software
