= NCH Software =

Software development company in Canberra, Australia

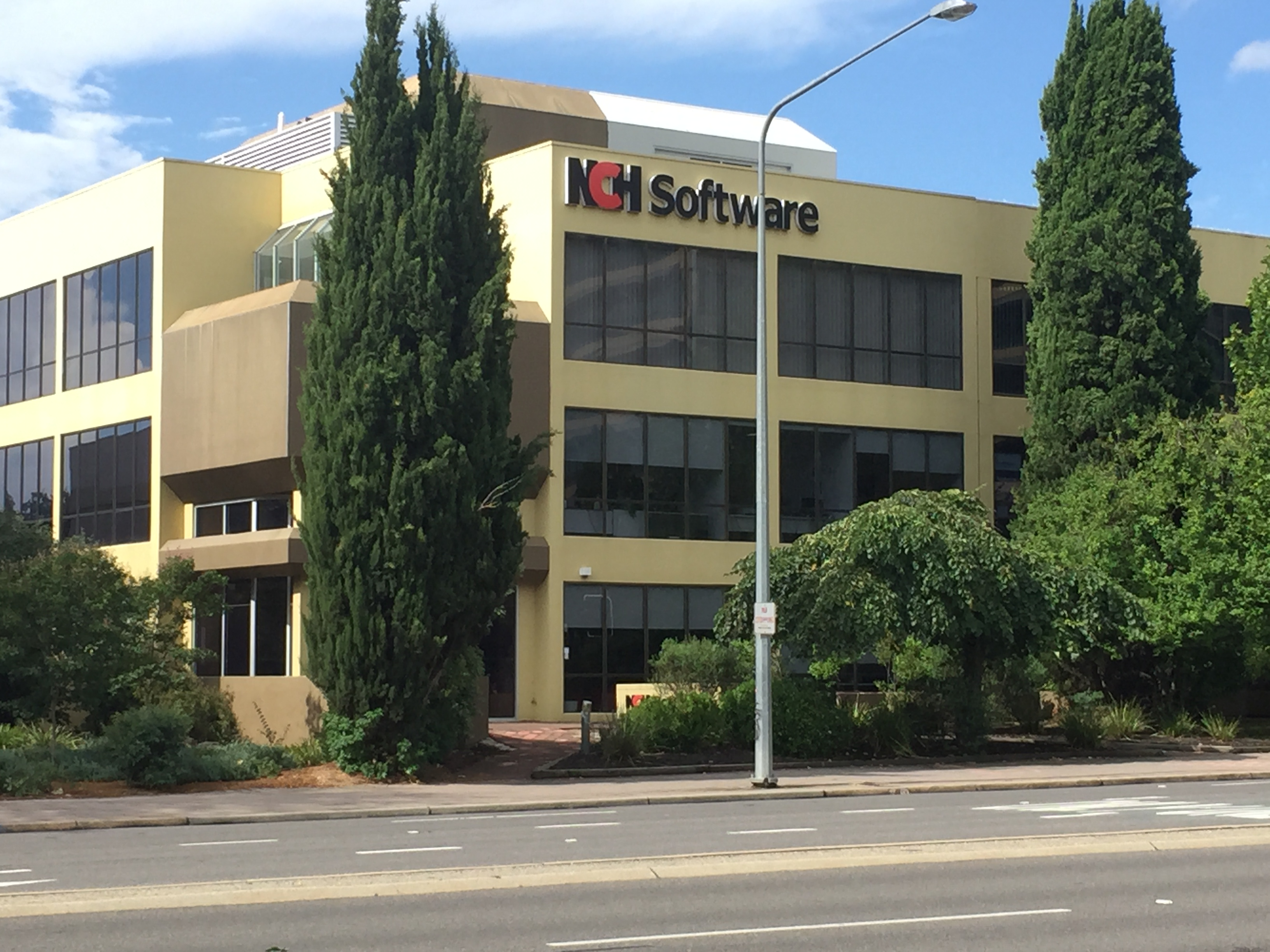
- Type: Private
- Industry: Computer software
- Founded: 1993
- Headquarters: Canberra, Australian Capital Territory, Australia
- Key people: Peter Lupton, Founder and CEO
- Products: NCH Software Product List
- Website: www.nchsoftware.com www.nch.com.au

NCH Software is an Australian software company founded in 1993 in Canberra, Australia. The Colorado office was started in April 2008 due to the large U.S. customer base.

== Software products ==
NCH Software provides software programs for audio, video, business, dictation and transcription, graphics, telephony and other utilities. On September 26, 2014, cnet.com showed their most-frequently downloaded program from NCH Software was WavePad Sound Editor Masters Edition.

VideoPad is the firm's video editing application for the home and professional market. It is part of a suite that integrates with other software created by the company. This other software includes WavePad, a sound-editing program; MixPad, a sound-mixing program; PhotoPad, a photo and image editor; Prism, a video format converter; Express Burn, a disc burning software; Switch, an audio format converter; Express Scribe, a transcription software; Express Zip, a file compression software; and Debut, a screen recorder and video capture software.

== Controversy ==
During 2013, some computer security companies categorized NCH software as bloatware because it bundled the Google Toolbar. In July 2015, NCH Software announced it was no longer bundling the Google Toolbar. As of November 30, 2015, NCH Software is marked clean by all major antivirus products.
