= VideoPad Video Editor =

Video editing application

- Screenshot of VideoPad Free 7.04 running on Windows 10, with a test project loaded.
- Developer: NCH Software
- Release: 16 December 2008; 17 years ago
- Stable release: (Windows) 17.60 / December 24, 2025; 9 months ago
- Written in: C++
- Operating system: Windows 7 and later Mac OS X 10.5 and later Android 6.0 and later iOS 12.0 and later
- Size: 2.59 MB
- Available in: 8 languages
- List of languages English, German, French, Spanish, Japanese, Italian, Korean, Russian, Bulgarian, Polish,
- Type: Video editing software
- License: Freemium (optional paid version)
- Website: www.nchsoftware.com/videopad/

VideoPad Video Editor (or simply VideoPad) is a video editing application developed by NCH Software. It is complemented by the VirtualDub plug-ins that work with the software.

VideoPad includes a software suite consisting of WavePad, a sound-editing program; MixPad, a sound-mixing program; and PhotoPad, an image editor.

VideoPad is also available on Steam.

== Features ==
VideoPad 17.45 (Released October 2025) has 51 transitions and 109 effects.

The application also has automatic subtitle generation and transcript-based editing.

VideoPad supports frequently used file formats including Audio Video Interleave (AVI), Windows Media Video (WMV), 3GP, and DivX. It supports direct video uploads to YouTube, Flickr, and Facebook.

Additionally, VideoPad can optionally use two screens: the first for a preliminary review of chosen video and audio snippets, and the second to review the entire track. The application supports several video effects, including those involving light, color, transitions, and text.

VideoPad could be considered trialware. The free edition is feature-limited; specifically, only AVI and WMV export is supported, while the non-free version has more advanced features. VideoPad Master Edition supports plugins while the free version does not. The paid version does not limit simultaneous video tracks, but the free one allows at most two concurrent tracks and limits export file type options after the trial period expires.

== Reception ==
VideoPad has received generally favorable reviews from CNET and (former) TopTenReviews, but has been noted to be vulnerable to rendering issues.

Redding Record Searchlight columnist Andrea Eldridge wrote in 2012 that the "easy-to-use VideoPad brings advanced features to the beginner". She said that VideoPad has a voice-over feature Windows Movie Maker did not have. The feature allows users to either record their own narration or upload existing recordings. Softonic.com said VideoPad was "simple" and "easy to use" but noted that "more advanced users will definitely find it too basic" and lamented that the program had "only three [transitions]". Danny Chadwick of Top Ten Reviews rated VideoPad a 6.15/10. He said the application was "great for beginners" but that it lacked "many of the transitions or extras that are standard in similar applications". Maximum PC contributor Ben Kim stated in 2014 that "VideoPad is easily the best free video editor available." Kim wrote that VideoPad is "a stellar editor that manages to pack an almost obscene number of features into a surprisingly digestible package".

== See also ==
- Comparison of video editing software
