= Serious Magic =

American video software company, 2001–2006

Serious Magic Inc.
- Serious Magic Logo after acquisition by Adobe Systems
- Type: Private company
- Industry: Computer software
- Founded: 2001
- Defunct: 2006
- Fate: Acquired by Adobe Systems
- Successor: Adobe Systems
- Headquarters: Folsom, California, United States
- Products: Visual Communicator, Vlog It!, DV Rack
- Website: www.seriousmagic.com

Serious Magic, Inc. was a software company based in Folsom, California, founded in 2001. The company developed video production and communications software targeting creative professionals, businesses, consumers and the education market. It was acquired by Adobe Systems in October 2006.

== Products ==
Serious Magic's product line included:

- DV Rack — a direct-to-disk field recording and monitoring application, allowing videographers to use a laptop as a production monitor and recorder on location
- Visual Communicator — a video presentation and communications tool for business and education
- Vlog It! — a video blogging tool aimed at consumer and online publishers

== Acquisition by Adobe ==
On 19 October 2006, Adobe Systems acquired Serious Magic Inc. and its product portfolio. The DV Rack and Visual Communicator products were subsequently integrated into Adobe's professional video toolset.
