= DEMO conference =

Series of technology-focused business conferences

The DEMO conference is a series of technology-focused business conferences in which pre-selected companies and entrepreneurs launch new products and services. Produced by IDG, DEMO seeks to identify and promote new technology with the potential to solve big problems with careful selection and coaching. Products launched at DEMO include: Salesforce.com, TiVo, VMware, Evernote, E*Trade, WebEx and Fusion-io. DEMO Conferences are held under the names DEMO Enterprise, DEMO Africa, DEMO China, DEMO Brazil, DEMO Asia (Vietnam), DEMO India, DEMO Europe (Russia), DEMO Pakistan, DEMO Traction, DEMO Tour, and DEMO Fall.

In 1990, Stewart Alsop II realized he was more intrigued by the one-on-one demonstrations of coming technologies conducted in hallways and hotel rooms during the off hours during technology conferences. This prompted Alsop to found the first DEMO Conference in 1991.

The conference draws media attention for its emerging technologies. At the DEMOSpring 2010 Conference, media attendees included Business Week, CBS, Forbes, Los Angeles Times, Popular Science, USA Today, and The Wall Street Journal. Entrepreneurs launching their products and services often cite publicity as a reason for choosing to pitch at DEMO. Additional conference attendees include venture capitalists, angels and other investors, corporate development officers, and entrepreneurs.

DEMO Conferences also feature prominent entrepreneurs and technology professionals as speakers and panelists at each event. Previous speakers include Twitter cofounder and Square CEO Jack Dorsey, SAP CEO Bill McDermott, LinkedIn CEO Jeff Weiner, Hewlett-Packard CTO Phil McKinney, and Google Enterprise President Dave Girouard.

== DEMO Enterprise ==
The DEMO Enterprise event highlights enterprise products gaining traction in the market and provides an early look at product prototypes still under development. Technologies ranging from cloud computing, mobile technology and big data to sensor networks, 3D printing and robotics are introduced to varying businesses of all sizes.

The DEMO Enterprise event features enterprise products gaining traction in the market, as well as irst glimpses at product prototypes under development. Technologies including remote healthcare, cloud computing, mobile technology, big data, sensor networks, 3D printing, and robotics are introduced to the landscape for enterprise.

25 percent of the products launched at DEMO 2004 were acquired, and 20 percent were acquired from DEMO 2005. These companies include:

- Half.com (eBay)
- Picasa (Google)
- IronPort (Cisco)
- Serious Magic (Adobe)
- Stata Labs (Yahoo)
- Danger, Inc. (Microsoft)

== DEMO Gods Award ==
=== DEMO Enterprise 2014 ===
DEMO Enterprise 2014 was held on April 3, 2014 in San Francisco.

- Eko Devices
- Learnmetrics
- Parklet
- ThinAir

== DEMO Tour ==
The DEMO Tour is a series of DEMO Days for pre-launch products where founders get private feedback on their product and pitch. Featured 2014 stops include:

- January 29, 2014—Chicago, IL, 1871
- January 31, 2014— Austin, TX, Capital Factory
- February 4, 2014—Boston, MA, Highland Capital Partners
- February 11, 2014—San Francisco, CA, IDG Ventures
- February 12, 2014- Silicon Valley, August Capital
- February 20, 2014—New York City, FirstMark Capital
