= Fraps =

Screen recording and benchmark utility for Windows

- Fraps on Windows 8.1
- Developer: Beepa Pty Ltd
- Initial release: August 25, 1999; 26 years ago
- Final release: 3.5.99 / 26 February 2013
- Operating system: Windows 98 and later
- Type: Benchmarking, screencasting
- License: Proprietary software
- Website: fraps.com

Fraps (derived from Frames per second) is a benchmarking, screen capture and screen recording utility for Windows developed by Beepa. It can capture from software that uses DirectX and OpenGL, such as PC games.

== Operation ==
Fraps is proprietary and commercial software, but it is free to use for frame rate display and benchmarking, and free to use with limitations for video capture (30 second time limit, watermark) and screen capture (BMP format only).

The frametimes benchmark feature (logging of individual frame render times) gained attention in 2013 on computer review sites in debate about micro stuttering in games.

On Windows Vista and Windows 7, the desktop can be captured if Windows Aero is enabled. Windows 8 game capture works, but not desktop capture as of version 3.5.99.

Fraps records video at high resolution if the computer is sufficiently powerful. The maximum supported resolution is 7680×4800.

Fraps uses a proprietary codec. Therefore, playing Fraps video output requires Fraps or ffdshow to be installed. Compression is relatively low and the resulting file sizes are relatively large: A two minute screencast of a full HD screen (1920×1080) may take up 3.95 GiB on disk. There is an option to encode the RGB value of every pixel, but the default is to use a YUV scheme for better compression. The color space used is Rec. 709, full range.

== History ==
Since version 3.5.0, Fraps has the ability to store the entire session in one video file. Prior to this update, all Fraps footage was split at 4GB and the split files would have to be joined at the transcoding stage. However, for backwards compatibility and limiting damage in case of a crash, there is still an option which allows users to use the old recording method of splitting videos. Since version 3.0, Fraps supports DirectX 11 and Windows 7. Since version 3.5.0, the minimum system requirements has changed. Fraps requires a CPU with SSE2 instructions (Pentium 4 and later) and Windows XP or later. Fraps has not been updated since February 26, 2013, and the trademark on Fraps expired on May 19, 2017.

== Reception ==
In 2012, Jim Norris from pcadvisor.co.uk praised Fraps for its featureset and usability, by stating: "Video capture is similarly option-generous with hot key functions, capture rates and sound settings that are all easy to understand and set". He also criticized the lack of customer support: "Beepa's customer support seems nonexistent. Several queries via their provided web forms (...) remained unanswered, and I was never able to contact anyone from the company despite repeated attempts to do so". But this, according to Jim Norris, seems in stark contrast to "the quality of the software and the speedy pace of its development." He concluded by praising the featureset of the free version: "the free version is quite feature generous and will suit the needs of almost every user." and gave the software 3.5 out of 5 stars.

== See also ==
- Analog video capture
- Bandicam
- Comparison of screencasting software
- Digital Screencasting
- HyperCam
- Screen capturing
