= Screencast =

Digital recording of computer screen output

A screencast is a digital recording of computer screen output, also known as a video screen capture or a screen recording, often containing audio narration. The term screencast compares with the related term screenshot; whereas screenshot generates a single picture of a computer screen, a screencast is essentially a movie of the changes over time that a user sees on a computer screen, that can be enhanced with audio narration and captions.

An example of screencasting: A video showing how to change a photo using "levels" in GIMP.

== Etymology ==
In 2004, columnist Jon Udell invited readers of his blog to propose names for the emerging genre. Udell selected the term "screencast", which was proposed by both Joseph McDonald and Deeje Cooley.

The terms "screencast," "screencam" and "screen recording" are often used interchangeably, due to the market influence of ScreenCam as a screencasting product of the early 1990s. ScreenCam, however, is a federal trademark in the United States, whereas screencast is not trademarked and has established use in publications as part of Internet and computing vernacular. Screen recording is now the most generic term.

== Uses ==
Screencasts can help demonstrate and teach the use of software features. Creating a screencast helps software developers show off their work. Educators may also use screencasts as another means of integrating technology into the curriculum. Students can record video and audio as they demonstrate the proper procedure to solve a problem on an interactive whiteboard.

Screencasts are useful tools for ordinary software users as well: They help filing report bugs in which the screencasts take the place of potentially unclear written explanations; they help showing others how a given task is accomplished in a specific software environment.

Organizers of seminars may choose to routinely record complete seminars and make them available to all attendees for future reference and/or sell these recordings to people who cannot afford the fee of the live seminar or do not have the time to attend it. This will generate an additional revenue stream for the organizers and makes the knowledge available to a broader audience.

This strategy of recording seminars is already widely used in fields where using a simple video camera or audio recorder is insufficient to make a useful recording of a seminar. Computer-related seminars need high quality and easily readable recordings of screen contents which is usually not achieved by a video camera that records the desktop.

In classrooms, teachers and students can use this tool to create videos to explain content, vocabulary, etc. Videos can make class time more productive for both teachers and students. Screencasts may increase student engagement and achievement and also provide more time in which students can work collaboratively in groups, so screencasts help them to think through cooperative learning.

In addition, screencasts allow students to move at their own pace since they can pause or review content anytime and anywhere. Screencasts are excellent for those learners who just need an oral as well as a visual explanation of the content presented.

== Software ==
Open-source tools exist for both screencasting and livestreaming the recorded video.

Trial versions of screencasting programs often apply a watermark, encouraging users to purchase the full version in order to remove it.

== Hardware ==
An alternative solution for capturing a screencast is the use of a hardware RGB or DVI frame grabber card. This approach places the burden of the recording and compression process on a machine separate from the one generating the visual material being captured.

== In popular culture ==
The films Unfriended, Unfriended: Dark Web, and Searching contain screencasts that were simulated for the purposes of the film.

== See also ==
- Comparison of screencasting software
- Online lecture
- Slidecast
- Screenshot
- Video capture
