= List of Turtle Beach Corporation products =

The following is a list of products branded by Turtle Beach Corporation.

Note:

- Status: D = discontinued; A = active
- Compatibility: NS2 = Nintendo Switch 2; NS = Nintendo Switch; PS5 = PlayStation 5; PS4 = PlayStation 4; PS3 = PlayStation 3; XBSXS = Xbox Series X/S; XB1 = Xbox One; PC = Personal computer; Xbox = unspecified Xbox console.

== Gaming headsets ==
Turtle Beach creates gaming headsets for consoles such as the Xbox One, Xbox Series X/S, PlayStation 4, PlayStation 5, Wii U, Nintendo Switch, Nintendo Switch 2, PC, mobile, and tablet devices. It is considered one of the leading gaming audio brands. Gaming headsets have been Turtle Beach's primary product offering since around 2005.

Turtle Beach headsets are generally cross-compatible between then and current-generation consoles like the Xbox One, Xbox Series X/S, PlayStation 4, PlayStation 5, Wii U, Nintendo Switch, Nintendo Switch 2, and PCs, as well as most mobile and tablet devices. Many models are console-specific, but share the same branding and can often be used across platforms (e.g. the Stealth 300 has a model for both the Xbox One and the PlayStation 4, but both are technically compatible with one another and the Nintendo Switch, and PC, etc.). Certain features on console-specific models may not transfer from one platform to another. For instance, the Stealth 600 and 700 models for the Xbox One can wirelessly connect directly with the console. Those same models for the PlayStation 4 do not have that feature. In some cases, the differences between one console-specific model and another are cosmetic.

=== Ear Force ===
| Model | Released | Compatibility | Status | Notes |
|---|---|---|---|---|
| Ear Force P21 | 2009 | PS3 | D | First headset designed specifically for PS3. |
| Ear Force XC1 | 2011 | Xbox 360 | | XBOX Communicator Headset |
| Ear Force XLC | | Xbox 360 | | Passive Stereo Sound |
| Ear Force XL1 | 2011 | Xbox 360 | D | Wired Stereo Sound; Headset designed specifically for the Xbox 360. |
| Atlas One | 2018 | PC (Note: Compatible with any computer, mobile device, or other gaming system with adapter) | A | Adapter makes it compatible with any computer, mobile device, or other gaming system. |
| Ear Force X11 | | Xbox 360 | | Amplified Stereo Sound |
| Ear Force X12 | | Xbox 360 | | Amplified Stereo Sound |
| Ear Force X21 | | Xbox 360 | | Universal Amplified Stereo Sound |
| Ear Force PX21 | | Xbox 360 | | Universal Amplified Stereo Sound |
| Ear Force X31 | | Xbox 360 | | Wireless Stereo Sound |
| Ear Force DX11 | | Xbox 360 | | Wired Dolby 7.1 Surround Sound |
| Ear Force DPX21 | | Xbox 360 | | Universal Dolby 7.1 Surround Sound |
| Ear Force PX3 | | Xbox 360 | | Programmable Universal Wireless Headset |
| Ear Force X41 | | Xbox 360 | | Wireless Dolby 7.1 Surround Sound |
| Ear Force XP500 | | Xbox 360 | | Programmable Wireless Dolby 7.1 Surround Sound + Wireless Chat |

=== Elite ===
| Model | Released | Compatibility | Status | Notes |
|---|---|---|---|---|
| Recon 50X | | Xbox | | |
| Recon 60P | | Xbox | | |
| Recon Camo | | Xbox | | |
| Recon Chat | | Xbox | | |
| Recon 70 | | Xbox | | |
| Recon 100 | | Xbox | | |
| Recon 50X | | Xbox | | |
| Recon 150 | | Xbox | | |
| Recon 320 | | Xbox | | |
| Recon Spark | | Xbox | | |
| Recon Camo | | | | |
| XO One | | | | |
| XO Three | | | | |
| XO Seven Pro | | | | |
| Elite 800X | | | | |
| Elite Pro | | | | |
| Elite Pro 2 | | | | |
| PX24 | | | | |
| Ear Force XP510 | | Xbox | | |
| Ear Force PX51 | | PS | | |
| Ear Force X42 | | Xbox | | |
| Ear Force P4 | | PS | | |
| Ear Force PX22 | | PS | | |
| Z Seven | | PC | | |

=== Stealth ===
List of products branded by Turtle Beach Corporation in the Stealth range
Model
Stealth 700
Stealth 700 Gen 2
Stealth 700 Gen 3
Stealth 300P
Stealth 600
Stealth 350VR
Stealth 300
Stealth 300X
Stealth 450DTS

== Sound cards ==
=== ISA bus ===
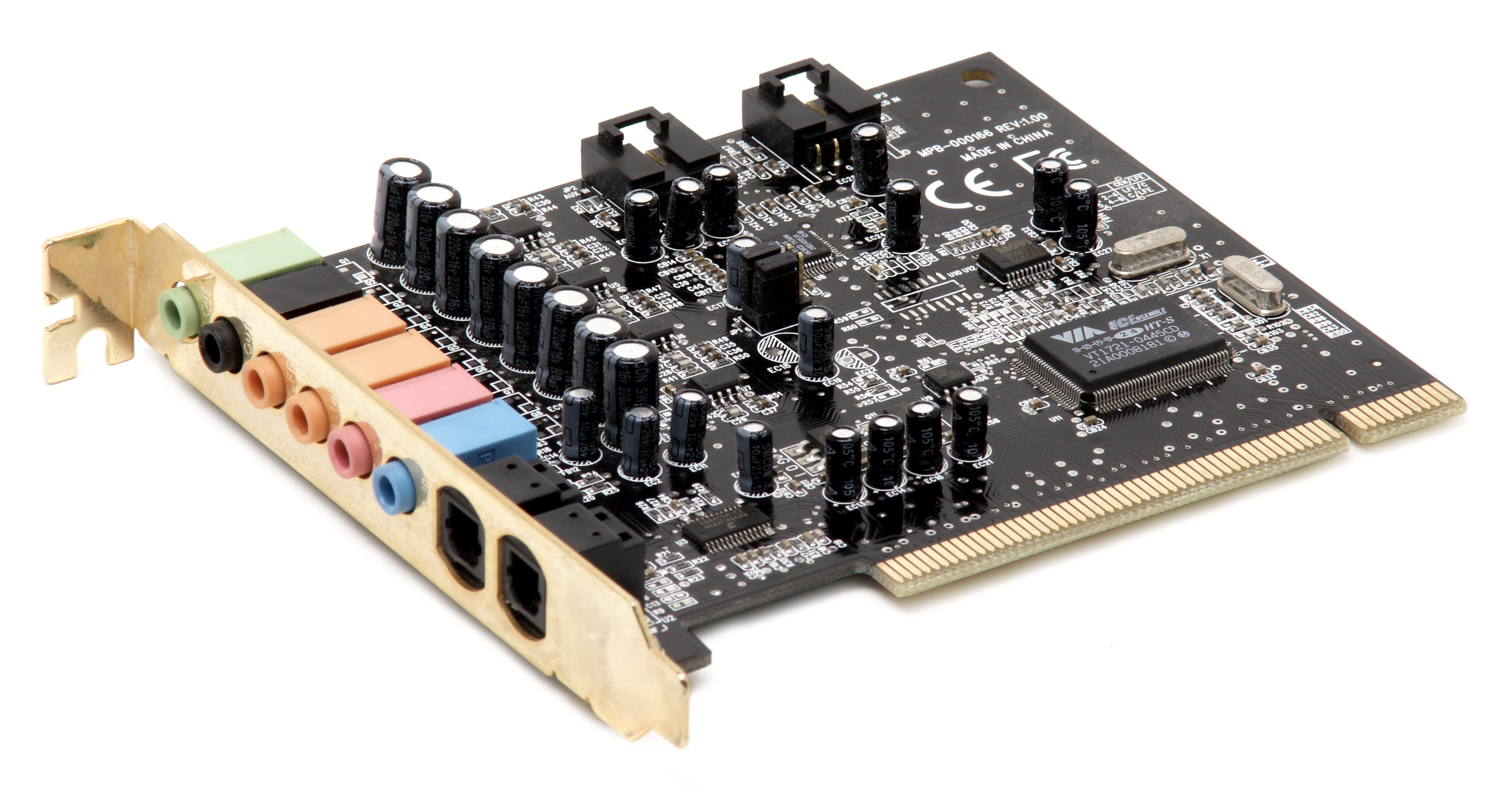
A Catalina brand card

Multisound family, Hurricane architecture:

- Multisound Classic – was a 430 USD full-length ISA sound card produced from 1991 to 1994. It contained an EMU Proteus 1/XR professional MIDI rack engine with 2 MB or 4 MB ROM sample pack and a Motorola 56001 / 68000 DSP chip pair for wave recording and playback. The card supported Windows 9x officially and can be used on Windows NT 4.0 and Windows 2000 using Peter Hall's drivers. The sound quality and feature set offered by MultiSound Classic was truly revolutionary at the time, but Creative Labs acquired EMU in 1994 and the supply of XR chips stopped. The card had to be redesigned accordingly, creating the Tahiti. A detailed analysis of the MultiSound's hardware is here
- Multisound Tahiti – Multisound Classic derivative without the on-card synthesis. Motorola 56001 DSP.
- Multisound Monterey – Multisound Monterey was the first cost-reduced version of the MultiSound. In essence the synthesizer (the E-mu Proteus) was replaced by the less expensive Rio card that was based on the ICS WaveFront wavetable synthesizer. The DSP and A/D was identical to the MultiSound, as the Monterey was a simple combination of the Rio mounted onto the Tahiti.

Multisound family, 2nd generation architecture:

- Multisound Fiji – last real professional ISA cards from Multisound line. Motorola 56002 DSP, Audiophile quality 20-bit DAC/ADC, >97 dB Signal to Noise Ratio, DSP-based Hurricane Architecture, Optional Digital S/PDIF I/O (with daughterboard), MPU-401 compatible, WaveBlaster compatible header, Enhanced Full Duplex, Windows 95 Plug'n'Play compatible. Compatible with Windows 95, 98, 98se and Me in Plug'n'Play mode; NT4, 2000 and XP (using the last NT4 non-Plug'n'Play driver and settings).
- Multisound Pinnacle – same as Multisound Fiji but with additional specifications : full-length ISA card, hardware sample-based synthesis (Kurzweil/HOMAC Synth Engine), 4 MB patch set (2 MB sample ROM – using proprietary Kurzweil compression), user expandable sample Set (supports up to 48 MB of Sample RAM on board, using two 32 bits SIMM sockets for FPM RAM), EIDE CD-ROM Interface.

Other:

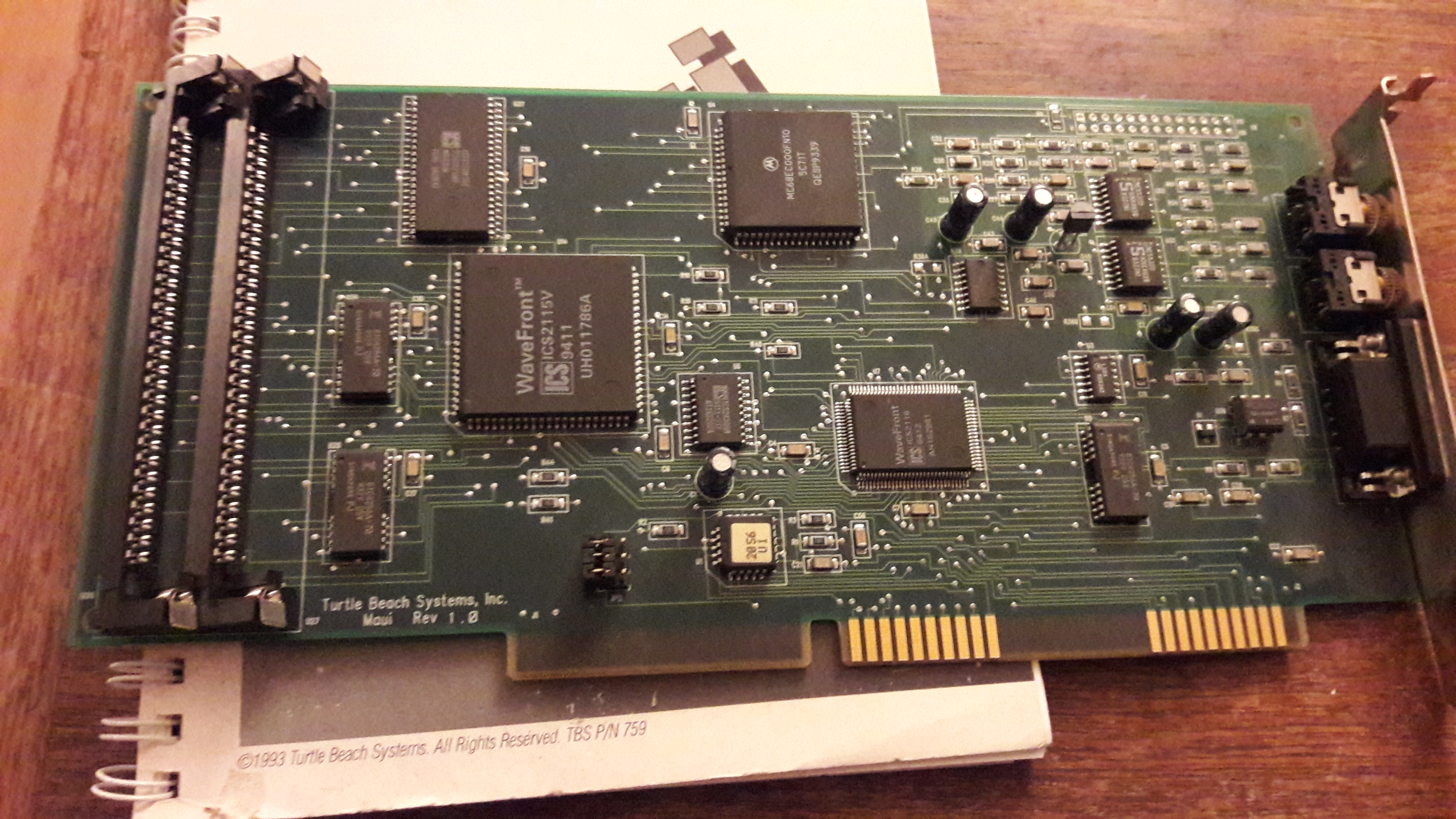
Maui rev 1.0 ISA sound card from Turtle Beach Corporation. It is a sample based GM synthesizer compatible with MPU-401. It has 256kiB RAM (expandable thanks to SIMM slots) to allow sample customization.

- Malibu Surround 64 – 4MB 64-Voice ISA bus sample-based soundcard introduced 1997. Uses Kurzweil hardware synthesis. 64 voices including 32 hardware voices and 32 software voices, 4MB instrument samples compressed to 2MB ROM. Crystal CS4237B PnP chipset.
- Maui – Maui was an inexpensive sample-based synthesizer add-on card. It used the ICS WaveFront synthesizer chip (as did the Tropez, Monterey and the Rio) and offered optional RAM slots that would allow users to add up to 8 megabytes of their own .WAV format samples (up to 16-bit 44.1 kHz). This process, called SampleStore, pre-dated the Creative/Microsoft "SoundFonts" concept by two years. This card was intended for Sound Blaster owners who wanted to improve their MIDI playback by adding sample-based synthesis. Because of SampleStore and WavePatch, a professional-grade sound programmer for all WaveFront-equipped cards, many music enthusiasts used the Maui as a cheap yet high-quality studio sampler.
- Monte Carlo 928 – Monte Carlo was the first Turtle Beach sound card that was not designed in-house. It was based on OPTi 928 reference design with Crystal Semiconductor codec for a "Sound Blaster and Windows Sound System Compatible" card. Featuring Yamaha OPL3, Wave Blaster connector and 3x AT-BUS CD-ROM interfaces.
- Monte Carlo 929 – Updated design of the earlier Monte Carlo. Featuring smaller OPTi 929 chip and 4x CD-ROM interface with IDE. Again reference design from Media Chips Inc. Both Monte Carlo cards used better CS4248 codec and original Yamaha YMF262 OPL3, when no-name cards with same reference design used cheaper Analog Devices AD1845/AD1848 codec and OPL3 clones.
- Tropez Classic – non PnP ISA card from same era as original SoundBlaster AWE32 and Gravis Ultrasound MAX. ICS Wavefront sample-based synthesizer, OPTi 929, CS4231 codec, 2MB ROM, 3 SIMM slots for max 12MB sample RAM, Yamaha OPL3 FM
- Tropez Plus / TBS-2001 – Updated PnP version of Tropez Classic. CS4232, ICS Wavefront, 4MB ROM, 3 SIMM slots for RAM, Yamaha OPL3 FM, Yamaha YSS225 SoundFX processor.
- TBS-2000 – Cost reduced versions of Tropez+ without SIMM slots. Only 2MB sample ROM. Crystal CS4232 PnP chip and WaveFront wavetable, Yamaha OPL3 FM. IDE interface.
- Tropez32 – OEM TBS-2000 with only 1MB half sample ROM for wavetable. Sold as part of the TBS-6700 and TBS-8900 CD-ROM kit.
- Tropez Lite – TBS-2000 with only 1MB like Tropez32. Retail box.
- TBS-929 – OEM low-cost card for CD-ROM upgrade kits with OPTi 929 chip like Monte Carlo 929.
- TBS-930 – updated non PnP card with OPTi 930. Integrated codec.
- TBS-931 – PnP card with OPTi 82C 931.

=== Wavetable Daughter Board ===
- Rio – The Rio was a 'wavetable' daughtercard MIDI synthesizer (sample-based synthesizer) that was compatible with the Sound Blaster daughtercard pinout. This product was intended for Sound Blaster owners who wanted to improve their MIDI playback by adding sample-based synthesis. The RIO offered one RAM slot that would allow users to add their own sounds, and was compatible with the WavePatch sound programmer. Unlike the Maui, however, the Rio used a SIPP slot for its expansion memory; compatible RAM was rather difficult and considerably more expensive to obtain. Board used ICS WaveFront synthesizer chip like Tropez and Maui cards.
- Cancun FX – Sample-based upgrade board for waveblaster connector. Dream SAM9733, 4MB ROM, 64 voice polyphony, GM/GS. Part of Montego II Home Studio set.
- HOMAC – Same Kurzweil synthesizer as the Malibu Surround 64 ISA card. Rockwell RWA030/035, 4MB samples compressed to 2MB ROM, 32 voice polyphony, GM. Part of Pinnacle Project Studio set.
- OPL4 daughter-board – Wavetable upgrade for Monte Carlo cards. Yamaha OPL4 chip.

=== PCMCIA bus ===
- Audio Advantage PCMCIA – old soundcard for notebooks, Hurricane architecture

=== PCI bus ===
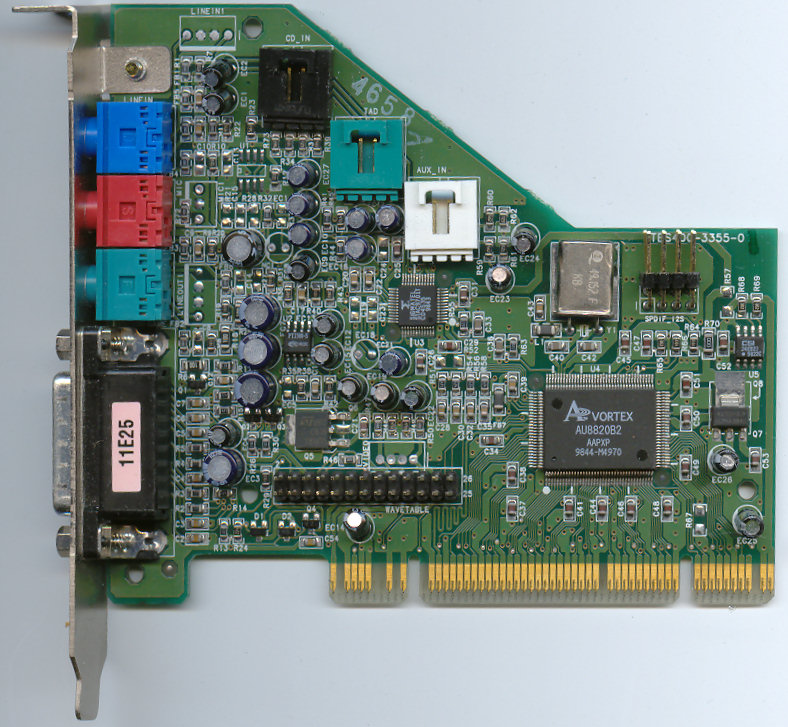
Montego A3DXstream

- Catalina – 5.1, 6.1, 7.1 Dolby Digital Surround Sound, EAX 2.0 with on board sound processing. Based on VIA Envy24HT-S audio chipset.
- Daytona PCI – early PCI card introduced November 1997, S3 Sonic Vibes 86C617 Chipset, Downloadable Sounds (DLS), hardware sample-based synthesis, SRS 3D Audio Enhancement

Part Number : TBS-0660-01V

- Montego DDL – Dolby Digital Live-capable. 5.1, 6.1, 7.1 Dolby Digital Surround Sound, EAX 2.0 with on board sound processing. See also: Montego DDL Control Panel
- Montego A3DXstream – based on the Aureal AU8820 (Vortex) chipset, unrelated to the current Montego DDL in every way but the name.
- Montego II Quadzilla – the Montego II was a family of cards that replaced the original Montego card. The card was based on the Aureal AU8830 (Vortex 2) chipset but differed from the reference Aureal design. The Quadzilla was the 4-channel version and achieved this via a separate daughtercard, whereas the other AU8830 cards such as Aureal Vortex SQ2500 and Diamond Monster Sound MX300 used a single card.
- Montego II Home Studio - included a more advanced S/PDIF I/O daughterboard than the Quadzilla as well as a Turtle Beach CancunFX MIDI daughterboard.
- Riviera – affordable Dolby Digital 5.1 Surround Sound without on-board sound processing. Based on C-Media CMI8738 audio controller chipset.
- Santa Cruz – Based on the Cirrus Logic SoundFusion (aka Crystal 4630) DSP. It featured four analog channel outputs, a line input and microphone input are included on the back panel. Also included is a connector TB dubbed the "VersaJack." The VersaJack has multiple functions selectable by software including digital SPDIF output, a second analog input, analog output or 5th and 6th speaker outputs. This card also supported an open source software based EAX. Dell Computer offered this card as an audio upgrade for some of its computers.

=== USB bus ===
- Audio Advantage – Popular line of USB sound cards, all of which have digital S/PDIF outputs. It comes in three models: Micro (2.0/SPDIF out), Amigo (2.0/SPDIF out, 2.0 in), and Roadie (2.0 and 5.1 out, 7.1 out, line/SPDIF out, line/SPDIF in, mic in). Roadie was later rebranded as SRM.

== Software ==
56K – The 56K Digital Recording System was the first of the Turtle Beach audio systems for the IBM PC platform. It made use of the Motorola 56000 Digital Signal Processor for accelerating digital audio data transfers through the IBM PC's ISA bus. The 56K was designed to be connected to the AES-EBU or S/PDIF jacks on a professional DAT recorder. With the included SoundStage graphical audio editing software, a 56K system installed in a 286, 386 or 486 Intel PC running Windows 3.0 or 3.1 can be used as a complete post-production digital audio editing solution. The 56K system consisted of three major components:

1. The 56K-PC Digital Signal Processor Card (a 16-bit digital audio processor on a full-length ISA board).
2. The 56K-D Digital Interface Box, which allows your DAT machine to talk to the computer via AES/EBU or S/PDIF-compatible digital formats.
3. The SoundStage digital audio editing software.

Quad – 4-track recording software for PC meant to somewhat mimic a 4-track cassette recorder.

== VelocityOne™ Flight Universal Control System ==
Flight simulator yoke and throttle quadrant for Xbox One, Xbox Series X/S and Windows.
