= C Cube =

C Cube may refer to:

- C-Cube, a semiconductor company
- C³, a Japanese light novel series
