= Microprocessor Chronicles =

Documentary film about Silicon Valley

The Microprocessor Chronicles is a documentary by filmmaker Rob Walker. Walker, who cofounded LSI Logic, created the film to document the growth and history of Silicon Valley. The work includes interviews with persons famous among notables in the microprocessor world. It discusses technical evolution of the microprocessor and marketing of devices.

The film is part of a series by Walker named Silicon Genesis. Another film in the series, The Fairchild Chronicles, talks about Mountain View's Fairchild Semiconductor. The series is supported by Stanford University.
