= Magnum Semiconductor =

Magnum Semiconductor Inc.
- Company type: Subsidiary
- Industry: Semiconductors
- Founded: January 2003; 23 years ago
- Defunct: April 2017
- Fate: Acquired
- Headquarters: Milpitas, California
- Key people: Gopal Solanki, CEO
- Number of employees: 500 (2008)
- Website: www.magnumsemi.com

Magnum Semiconductor Inc. was a video compression technology company headquartered in Milpitas, California, and with an engineering branch at Waterloo, Ontario, Canada. It traded under the Magnum Semiconductor name between its foundation in 2003, and its 2016 acquisition by GigOptix, when the combined company was rebranded as GigPeak.

Magnum's consumer products were found in video recorder products of consumer electronic manufacturers.

== History ==
Magnum Semiconductor was formed in 2003 as a spinout of the Cirrus Logic Video Division which developed MPEG video recording and enabled consumer DVD recorders. Investors included August Capital, and Investcorp Technology Partners. In May 2007, a second round of $27 million in funding was announced, led by Investor Growth Capital, with new investors WK Technology Fund, KTB Ventures, and Gold Hill Capital.

Magnum acquired the consumer products division of LSI Corporation in June 2007, including Domino and Zevio video compression technology. The LSI division had started with the acquisition of C-Cube Microsystems, the first company to offer real time MPEG1 and MPEG2 compression. The company's products target both professional and consumer markets.

Magnum offered hardware, software, reference platforms, and engineering support for digital video recording, playback and management of audio/video content. The Magnum platforms also enabled sharing entertainment via optical disc, flash disk and home networking.

In February 2008 Gopal Solanki, from Nvidia, took over as the chief executive from Jack Guedj. A $12 million from NXT Capital Venture Finance was announced in October 2012.

In April 2016, Magnum was acquired by GigOptix, with the combined company rebranded as GigPeak.

GigPeak was based in San Jose, California, and listed on the New York Stock Exchange with symbol GIG.

GigPeak was acquired by Integrated Device Technology in 2017.
