= OPTi =

Former semiconductor company in California

OPTi Inc.
- Company type: Public
- Industry: Fabless semiconductor
- Founded: 1989; 37 years ago in Milpitas, California, United States
- Defunct: September 2001; 24 years ago
- Fate: Dissolved
- Successor: OPTi Technologies (2002–2020)
- Key people: Kenny Liu, CEO (1989–1994); Jerry Chang, CEO (1994-1998), Bernie Marren, CEO (1998–2001)
- Products: Chipsets
- Number of employees: 235 (early 1990s, peak)
- Website: opti.com at the Wayback Machine (archived 1996-11-13)

OPTi Inc. was a fabless semiconductor company based in Milpitas, California, that primarily manufactured chipsets for personal computers. The company dissolved in 2001 and transferred its assets to the unaffiliated non-practicing entity OPTi Technologies (itself later renamed OPTi Inc.)

== History ==
OPTi Inc. was formed in 1989 in Milpitas, California, by former employees of Chips and Technologies. Cash-strapped on a "shoe-string [budget]" on its foundation, among the company's first products was a trio of VLSI chipsets for i386SX- and i486-equipped AT motherboards. The first was a direct-mapped CPU cache for 386SX motherboards; the second was a burst-mode CPU cache for 486 motherboards; and the third was a interleaved memory module for 486 motherboards. OPTi measured the latter two chipsets to reduce the component count on 486 motherboards clocked at 40 MHz (or 11 MIPS) to as few as 20. In 1991, Chips and Technologies filed a patent infringement suit against OPTi, alleging unauthorized use of two of C&T's patents regarding semiconductor memory designs and particularly interleaved memory schemes, but a federal judge later ruled in OPTi's favor.

In early 1992, the company developed one of the first local bus designs for IBM PC compatibles. It soon found itself competing with VESA's implementation and the nascent PCI bus standard by Intel. It survived into the Pentium era before OPTi submitted to Intel and began manufacturing PCI chipsets. Later in 1992, OPTi introduced a programmable writethrough–writeback cache chipset for the contemporary wave of upgradable motherboards, supporting up to 64 MB of RAM and processors by Intel, Cyrix, and AMD.

OPTi had a peak workforce of 235 employees and US$164 million in annual sales in the early 1990s; only three years after its inception, OPTi's revenue for fiscal year 1991 reached $100 million, under CEO Kenny Liu (b. 1954). Although considered a small company, OPTi's initial public offering in 1993 proved successful in the short term. However, the ramping-up of Intel's chipset manufacturing in 1994 challenged OPTi's presence in its market. While Intel saw OPTi as its nearest competitor then, Intel accounted for 66 percent of all sales of Pentium-class chipsets, with OPTi at 10 percent and Taiwan-based SiS at 7 percent. Liu stepped down from his role as CEO in 1994, remaining chairman of the board.

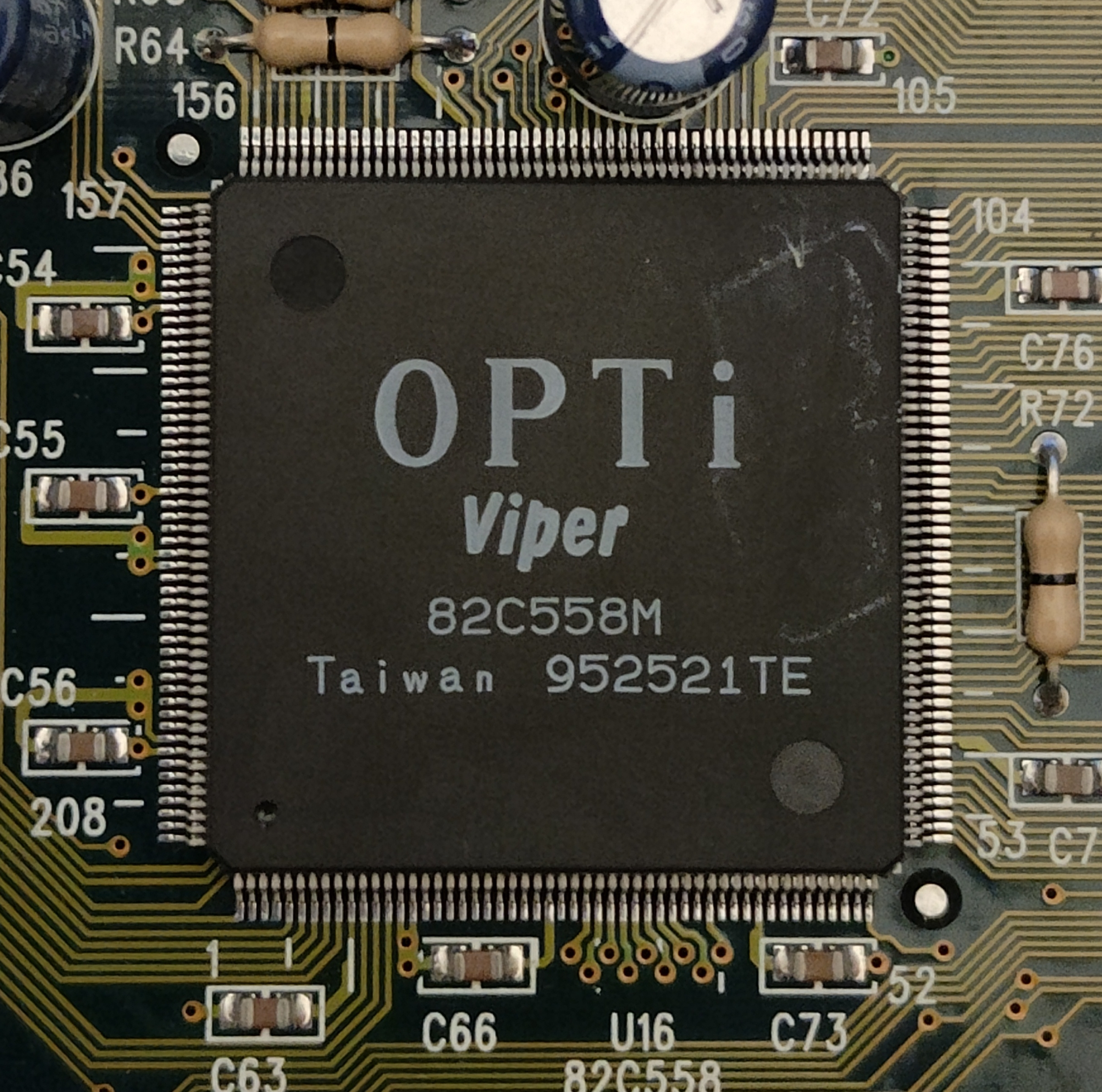
OPTi Viper-M chipset soldered to a motherboard (part number 82C558M)

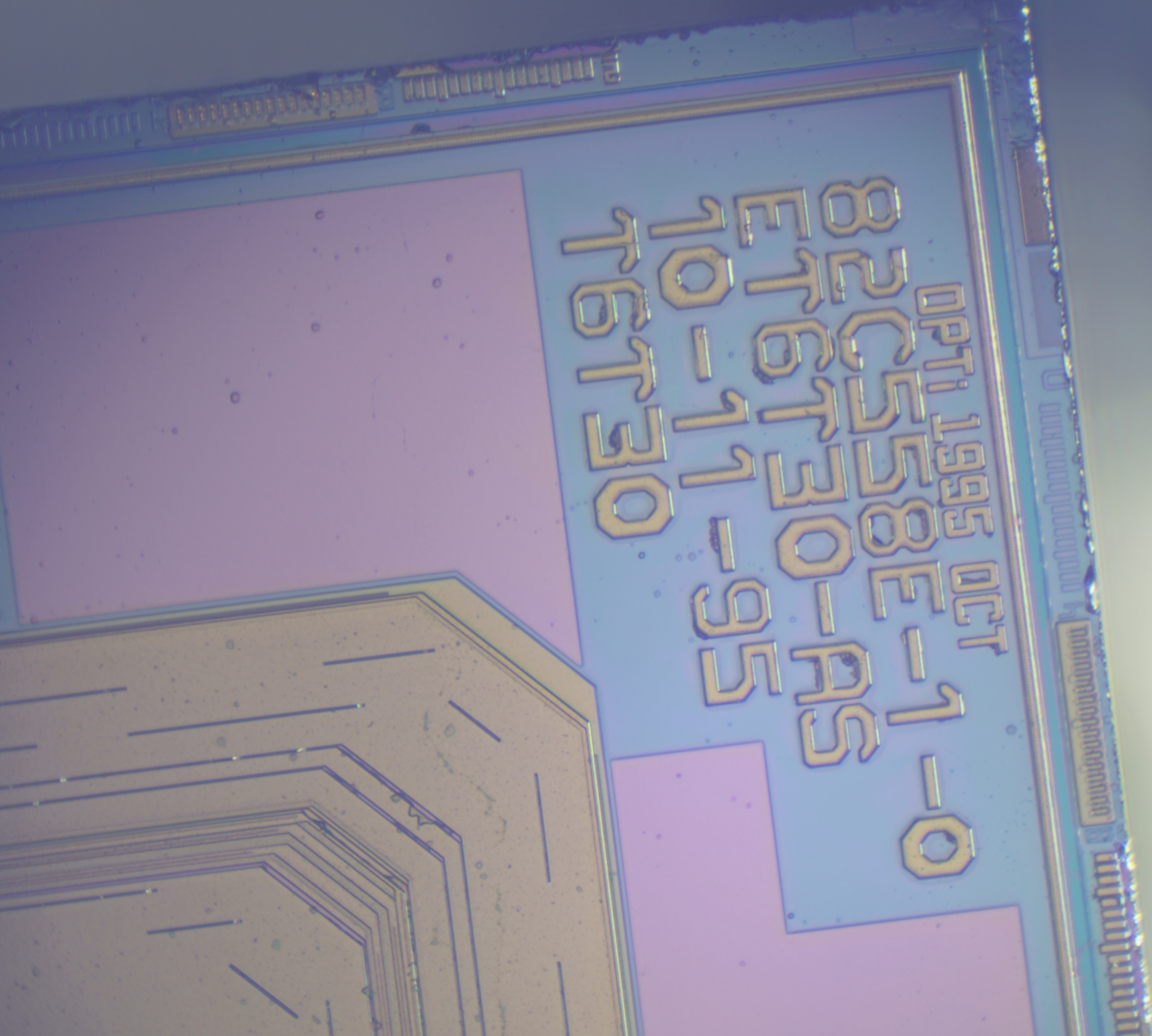
Close-up of die shot showing copyright notice for OPTi Viper chipset (part number 82C558E)

OPTi was reasonably more successful in the mobile chipset arena, starting with i486-based chipsets for notebooks and other portable computers in 1994, earning design wins from Toshiba, NEC, and Hewlett-Packard with its PCI-based Viper-N chipset from December 1994 to mid-1995. OPTi's Viper-M chipset, its challenger to Intel's Triton chipset on the desktop, was notable for supporting Cyrix's then-unreleased 6x86 processor, as well as AMD's K5—both competitors to Intel's Pentium, which Viper-M also supported. Contemporary chipsets from Intel only had support for the Pentium. In September 1995, OPTi joined an alliance with semiconductor fabricator United Microelectronics Corporation and several other fabless companies including SIS to raise a 350–250 nm semiconductor plant within Hsinchu, Taiwan, in late 1995 or early 1996.

OPTi dabbled with 2D graphics processing unit design with the TrueColor GUI Accelerator in August 1995. Two years prior, the company had acquired MediaChips Inc., a designer of low-cost digital sound chips, whose patents for a single-chip sound controller it used to design the OPTi 929 in 1994. In 1997, OPTi and Singapore-based TriTech Microelectronics were sued by Crystal Semiconductor, a subsidiary of Cirrus Logic, for alleged patent infringement of Crystal's mixed-signal technology used in the audio component of the Viper-M chipset, which OPTi designed around being compatible with Intel's Native Signal Processing technology. The courts ruled in favor of Crystal in late 1999 or early 2000, ordering TriTech and OPTi to pay their portion of a combined $20 million.

== Dissolution, sale, and litigation streak ==
OPTi found itself unable to compete against Intel's newfound dominance in the chipset market, with sales all but disappearing by late 1998. The company, which had moved to Palo Alto, California, appointed Bernie Marren as CEO that year. Marren, who had been a board director since 1996, steered the company away from the chipset business in 1999, in favor of developing microcontrollers for notebooks, chiefly LCDs and USB and IEEE 1394 (FireWire) serial buses. These products however barely broke even, and in September 2001, OPTi's board of directors voted unanimously to dissolve the company, subject to approval in November 2001. After a year of dormancy, the company sold its semiconductor business and assets to the unaffiliated company OPTi Technologies. Marren soon took the reins of OPTi Technologies, and the company shortly after renamed themselves OPTi Inc.

This incarnation of OPTi Inc. became known as a non-practicing entity—acting only as licensor for their patents and litigating against other semiconductor businesses for alleged infringement of their patents—under Marren's management. Their litigation began shortly before the establishment of OPTi Technologies, with Intel in 2001. Intel settled out of court with OPTi that year for $13.5 million in exchange for the purchase of patents OPTi alleged that Intel had infringed. OPTi then launched a string of successful suits against Amtel, Broadcom, Renesas, Silicon Storage Technology, STMicroelectronics, Standard Microsystems Corporation, and VIA Technologies. CNET characterized this as a "patent infringement litigation rampage".

In early 2006, OPTi filed the first of numerous patent infringement suits against Nvidia; by 2009 the company had won a total of $14.75 million in judgments and settlements against Nvidia, with further litigation by that point still in limbo. Also in 2006, OPTi launched an infringement suit against AMD, though this case stalled until February 2010. The courts ruled in favor of OPTi in May 2010, and AMD agreed to pay $32 or $35 million to OPTi.

In January 2007, OPTi launched a suit in the U.S. District Court for the Eastern District of Texas against Apple Inc. for the unauthorized use of OPTi's "predictive snooping of cache memory for master-initiated accesses" patent in Apple's Macintosh computers. The courts in Texas ruled in favor of OPTi and ordered Apple to pay $21.7 million—$19 million in instances of patent misuse and $2.7 million in prejudgement interest (potential lost profits for OPTi due to its focus on the lawsuit). Apple announced its intention to appeal in December 2009 but dropped this appeal a year later—on the day before a court was to hear it.

OPTi (Technologies) Inc. in 2010 only staffed three people, including Marren. The company again sued VIA Technologies in 2013 and won on judgement $2.1 million plus $1 million as prejudgement interest, but lost this on VIA's appeal. For the fiscal years ending in 2014 and 2015, the company reported no revenue from licensing and claimed operating losses. In 2018, the company was down to its last employee. OPTi finally shuttered in September 2020.
