= Video capture =

Process of recording and processing incoming video signals

Video capture is the process of converting an incoming digital or analog video signal (and accompanying audio)—such as that produced by a video camera, or any other video source—for the purposes of using a computer, the cloud, content delivery network or AI servers to process, broadcast, provide image recognition, or otherwise share the captured video.

The earliest 16-bit ISA capture cards emerged in the early 90s. These cards were supported by VIDCAP as part of the Video for Windows package. One early card was a sandwich of two cards as early processors needed more logic to even get up to 15 frames per second (fps).

During the mid 90's and onwards the move to early versions of PCI (the forerunner of PCI Express) offered video capture cards with reduced latencies and increased frame rates, typically up to around 30fps. This was possible due to the higher bus bandwidths offered by this newer parallel PCI computer bus. Emerging brands included companies like Matrox, ATI and others, that often bundled multimedia kits, sometimes including graphics cards, and other components with the capture card solution.

The next major step function in video capture card technology occurred around 2012-2013 quite a few years after PCI Express was released (around 2005–6). This offered dedicated bandwidth per lane and much higher data throughput(s) than the original PCI. This in turn facilitated the emergence of video capture cards that could manage both analog SD video and newer higher-resolution digital video standards such as FULL HD (1080p).

The latest generation of video capture card devices uses standards like PCI Express Gen 2, typically with multiple PCI lanes as well as serial bus standards such as USB3 or Thunderbolt to capture up to 4K video with 30 or 60 frames per second. For certain machine vision applications the frame rates can be considerably higher, however these systems are often monochrome to manage and reduce the PCIe bandwidth requirements.

== Technology used in capture cards ==
Special low-noise and low-jitter circuitry as well as very high-speed PCB layout techniques are now required to make capture cards for digital and analog video sources. At the system level this function is typically performed by a dedicated video capture device, colloquially called a capture card. Such devices typically employ integrated circuit video decoders to convert incoming video signals to a standard digital video format, and additional circuitry to convey the resulting digital video to local storage or to circuitry outside the video capture device, or both. Depending on the device, the resulting video stream may be conveyed to external circuitry via a computer bus (e.g., PCI/104 or PCIe) or a communication interface such as USB, Ethernet or Wi-Fi, or stored in mass-storage memory in the device itself (e.g., digital video recorder).

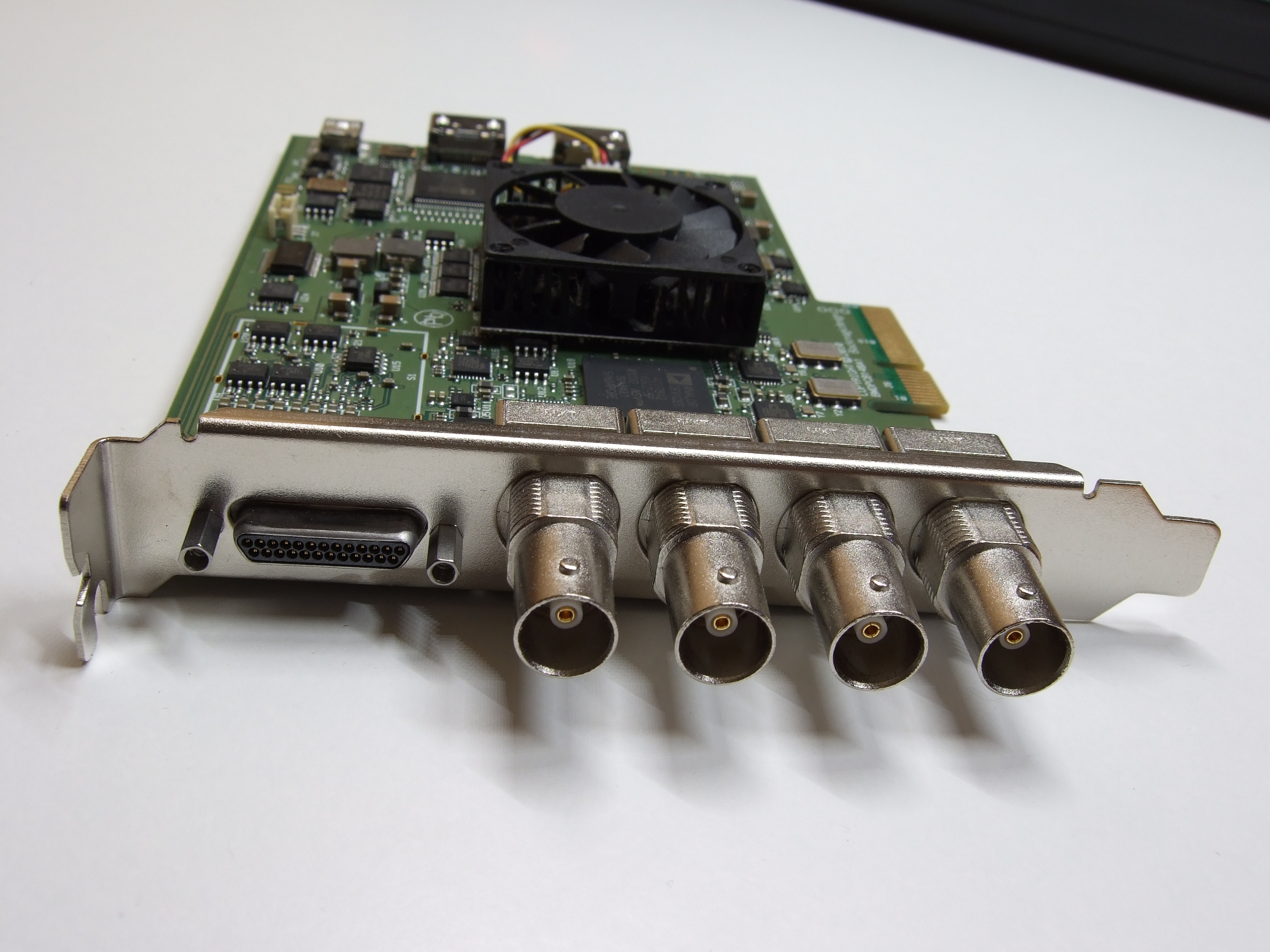
A dual link 3 Gbit/s SDI video capture card for PCIe (Blackmagic Design DeckLink HD Extreme 3D)

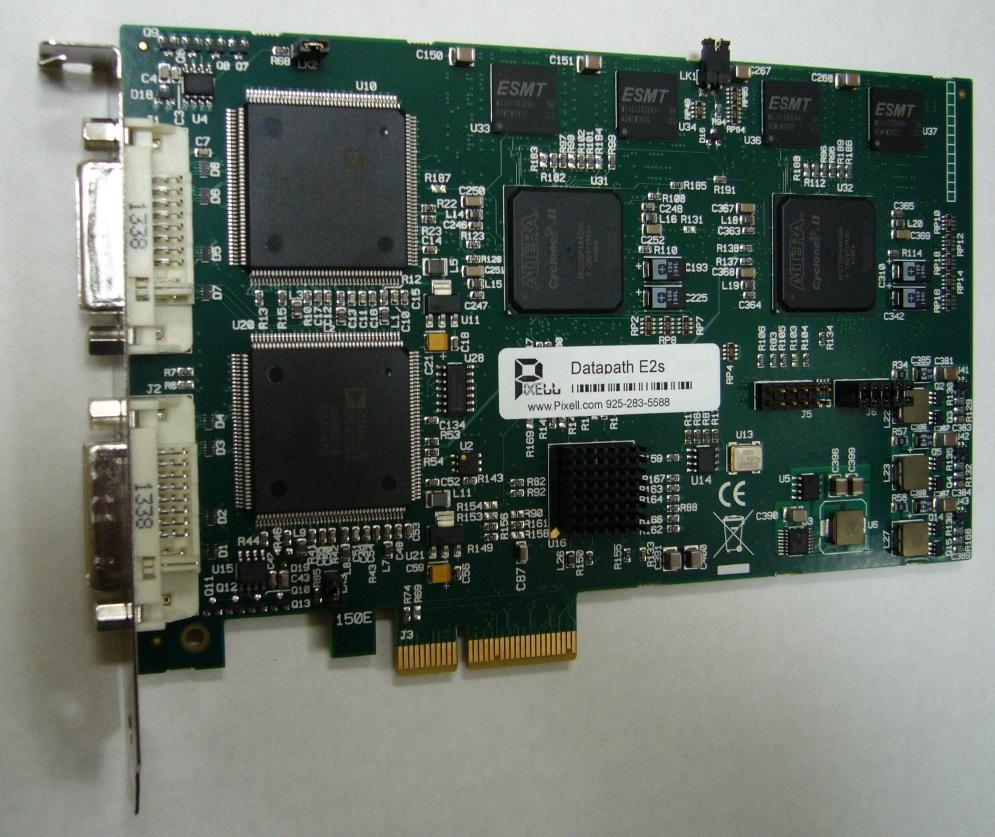
A PCIe 2-port HDMI video capture card (Datapath VisionRGB-E2s)

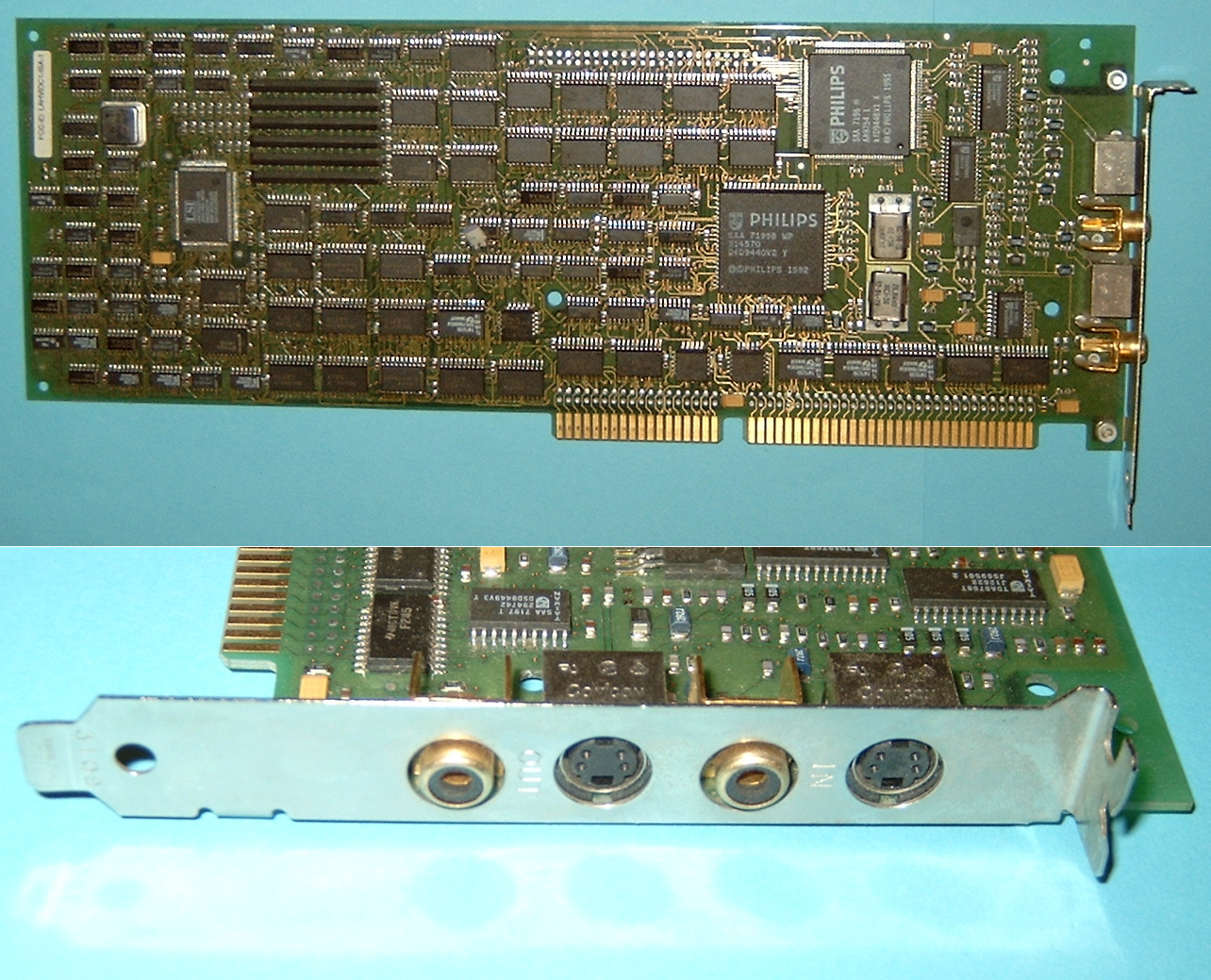
ISA analog video capture card

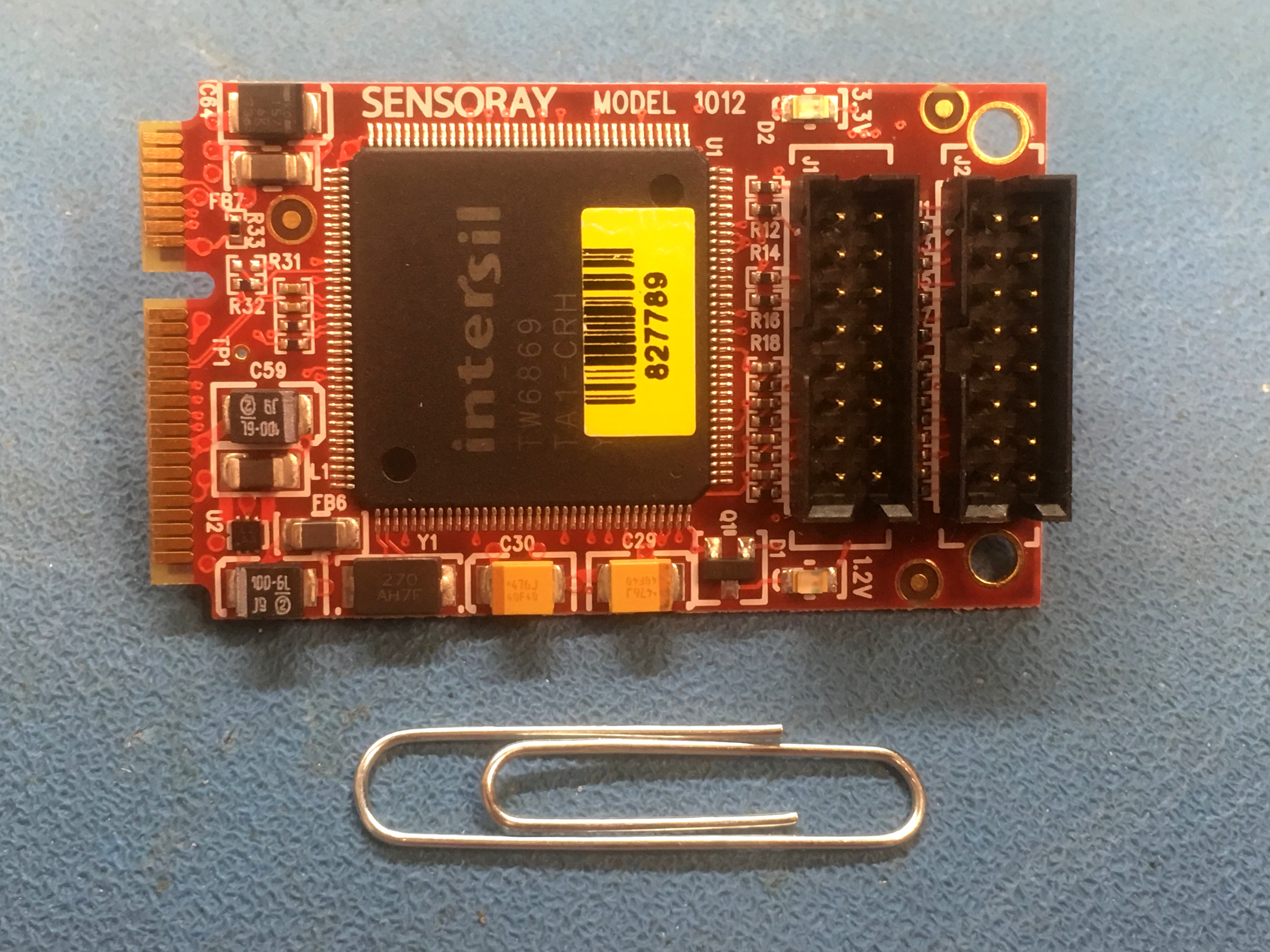
A Mini PCIe card that simultaneously captures 8 video and 8 audio signals (Sensoray 1012)

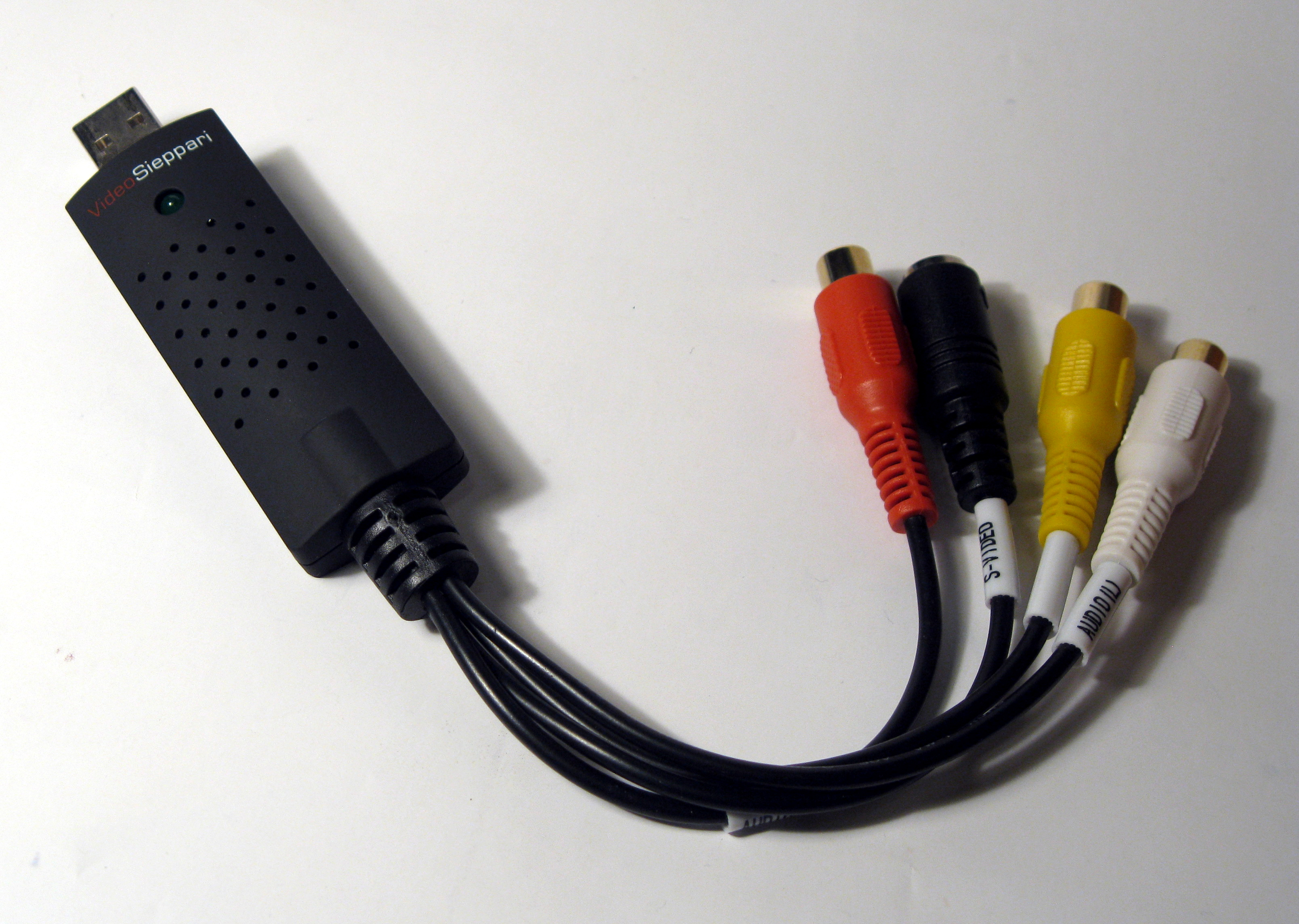
A low-cost, consumer-grade USB audio/video capture device (Reddo Videosieppari)

== See also ==
- TV tuner cards, which employ video capture circuitry to capture broadcast television
- Frame grabber
- Uncompressed video
- Dazzle (video recorder)
