= LSI Logic =

American company

LSI Logic Corporation
- Type: Subsidiary
- Traded as: Nasdaq: LSI
- Industry: Semiconductors; Storage; Networking
- Founded: November 1980; 46 years ago, in Santa Clara, California, U.S.
- Founders: Wilfred Corrigan; Bill O’Meara; Rob Walker; Mitchell "Mick" Bohn
- Defunct: 2014; 12 years ago
- Fate: Acquired by Avago Technologies, now Broadcom Inc.
- Headquarters: San Jose, California, U.S.
- Parent: Broadcom Inc.
- Website: lsi.com at the Wayback Machine (archived 2013-03-26)

LSI Logic Corporation was an American ASIC and EDA company founded in Santa Clara, California. The company designed and sold semiconductors and software that accelerated storage and networking in data centers, mobile networks and client computing.

In April 2007, LSI Logic merged with Agere Systems and rebranded the firm as LSI Corporation.On May 6, 2014, LSI Corporation was acquired by Avago Technologies (now known as Broadcom Inc.) for $6.6 billion.

== History ==
=== 1981–2004 ===
LSI Logic Corporation was incorporated in November 1980 by Wilfred J. Corrigan and began operating in early 1981 using leased facilities in Santa Clara, California. The name "LSI" referred to Large Scale Integration. Corrigan recruited co-founders Bill O'Meara (VP Marketing and Sales), Rob Walker (VP Engineering) and Mitchell "Mick" Bohn (CFO). Initial funding of $6 million came from a consortium of venture capitalists, including Kleiner Perkins Caufield & Byers II, Institutional Venture Partners, and Technical Development Capital Ltd. A second round of $16 million in funding from Sequoia Capital, a group of investment bankers from the UK and First Interstate Bank came In March 1982. That year, LSI Logic had $5 million in sales and a loss of $3.7 million.

The initial plan called for a line of CMOS gate arrays created from “masterslices” which were uncommitted transistors customized to a specific application by the deposition of unique metal interconnections. The intention was to have the masterslices manufactured by external semiconductor companies and then do the metallization themselves. In order to jump start the business, they licensed an existing CMOS gate array design from California Devices Inc. (CDI) and reverse engineered and improved on an ECL gate array design from Motorola.

The first interactive CAD system was called LSI Design System (LDS). The initial EDA flow was based on simulation from TEGAS and place and route from Silvar-Lisco, integrated on Megatek hardware. What made them unique from other ASIC vendors at the time was that they willing to ship the software to their customers rather than keeping it in-house, which was the strategy used by market leaders at the time. In 1982 they started development of their own in-house CAD tools and moved to Silicon Graphics hardware. By 1988, the EDA industry had developed enough that customers wanted to be able to use 3rd party tools.

Sales grew rapidly and they were able to launch a successful initial public offering on the Nasdaq exchange on May, 13 1983. The offering was underwritten by Morgan Stanley & Co and Hambrecht & Quist. 7 million shares of common stock were issued at a price of $21 per share. The stock hit a peak of $25.50 during the day and closed at $24 a share which valued the company at $588M. Once underwriters options were exercised the total offering brought in $153 million. Stock symbol: LLSI.

In 1984, LSI Logic formed a Japanese affiliate, Nihon LSI Logic Corporation, and British subsidiary LSI Logic Ltd. In February 1985, a Canadian subsidiary, LSI Logic Corporation of Canada, Inc., was formed.

In 1985, the firm entered into a joint venture called Nihon Semiconductor, Inc. together with Kawasaki Steel—Japan's third largest steel manufacturer—to build a $100 million wafer fabrication plant in Tsukuba, Japan.

In 1987, LSI Logic was among the 14 founding members of SEMATECH, but later withdrew from the organization in January 1992.

In December 1987, LSI Logic licensed from MIPS Computer Systems the rights to manufacture the R2000 and R3000 processors, and the right to implement the MIPS I instruction set architecture (ISA) in their own ASIC designs.

In March 1988, LSI Logic agrees to manufacture and sell the SPARC RISC microprocessor under license from SUN Microsystems.

In October 1988, LSI Logic acquired a controlling stake in Video Seven Inc., a designer, manufacturer, and marketer of PC graphics boards

In April 1989, LSI Logic merged its G-2 Inc PC chipsets and Video Seven Inc. graphics chip buses to create Headland Technology Inc, a subsidiary to be run by LSI Logic founder Bill O'Meara

In October 1989, LSI Logic transferred its stock listing from NASDAQ: LLSI to NYSE: LSI.

In July 1991, LSI Logic entered into an agreement with Sanyo Electric of Japan to make a set of chips that translate an HDTV signal into a television image.

In July 1992, LSI Logic announced CoreWare subsystems as part of its ASIC design flow .

In 1993, Sony Computer Entertainment chose LSI Logic as their ASIC partner, charged with fitting the PlayStation CPU on a single chip. LSI's CoreWare could do it, while other offers made to Sony needed two chips. Sony also worked with LSI's engineers develop the graphics engine, DMA controller, I/O and bus controllers.

In 1995, LSI Logic acquired all the remaining shares (45%) of its Canadian subsidiary LSI Logic Corporation of Canada, Inc., which it did not already own.

In 1997, LSI Logic acquired Mint Technology, an engineering services company.

In August 1998, LSI Logic acquired Symbios Logic from Hyundai Electronic for $760 million cash.

In February 1999, LSI Logic acquired Seeq Technology for $106 million in stock, adding physical-layer based Ethernet technology to LSI's product line.

In January 2000, LSI Logic established a $50M venture fund to invest in startups in the communication sector.

In May 2000, LSI Logic acquired IntraServer for $70 million, with expectations to add their rapidly expanding customer base to LSI's own.

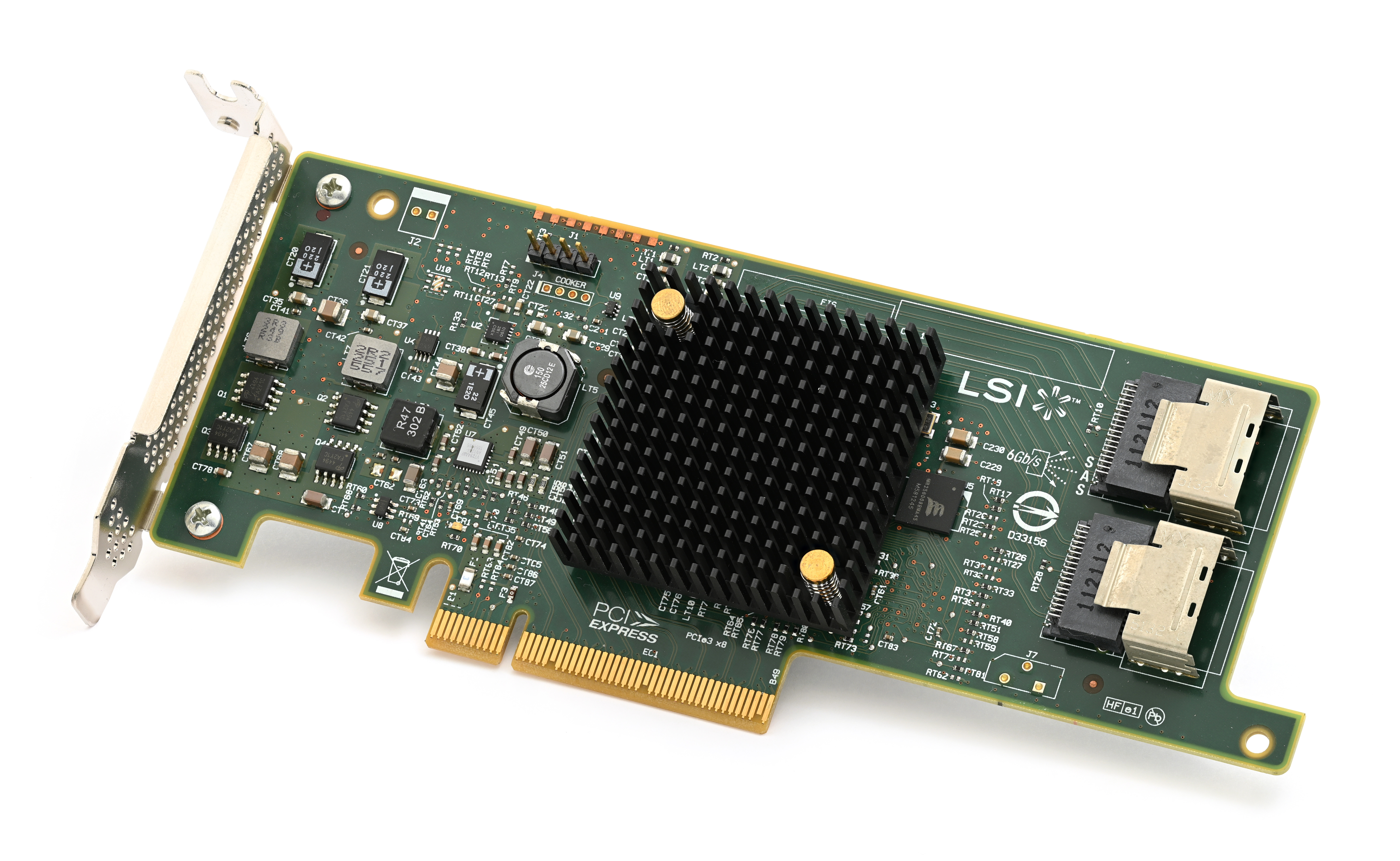
LSI 9207-8i SAS host adapter

In November 2000, LSI Logic acquired Syntax Systems, and in August 2001 the groups merged to become LSI Logic Storage Systems, and later Engenio Information Technologies.

In March 2001 LSI Logic acquired C-Cube Microsystems, a video compression semiconductor company, for $878 million in stock.

In September 2001 LSI Logic acquired the RAID adapter division from American Megatrends in a $221 million cash transaction. Included in this deal, LSI received AMI's MegaRAID software intellectual property, host bus adapter products and 200 RAID employees.

In January 2002 LSI Logic and Storage Technology Corporation (StorageTek) entered an alliance making StorageTek the distributor of their co-branded storage products.

In August 2002 LSI Logic acquired Mylex from IBM, to expand its storage technologies.

In November 2003, LSI Logic sold its Tsukuba, Japan wafer fabrication facility to ROHM Company, Ltd. for $23.5 million.

The Engenio division of LSI Logic filed for its own IPO in 2004, but withdrew citing adverse market conditions after the burst of the dot-com bubble.

=== 2005 to 2014 ===
In May 2005, Abhi Talwalkar joined LSI Logic as president and CEO, and was also appointed to the board of directors. Talwalkar was an executive at Intel Corporation before joining LSI. Wilfred Corrigan was Chief Executive Officer and Chairman from 1981 to June 2005 and Chairman from June 2005 until May 2006.

In April 2006, LSI Logic sold the Gresham, Oregon design and manufacturing facility to ON Semiconductor for $105 million in cash

In October 2006, LSI Logic agreed to an all-stock merger with Agere Systems worth about $4 billion.

In March 2007, LSI Logic acquired SiliconStor Inc., a provider of semiconductor solutions for enterprise storage networks, for approximately $55 million in cash.

In April 2007, LSI Logic completed its merger with Agere Systems Inc., who previously owned LSI's Mobility Products Group, and rebranded the firm LSI Corporation.

In July 2007, Magnum Semiconductor Inc. a spin-off of Cirrus Logic Inc., acquired LSI Corporation's consumer products business and 13 percent of LSI's workforce. These lines included architectures named DoMiNo and Zevio, evolutions of the C-Cube Microsystems technology.

In August 2007, LSI Corporation signed an agreement with STATS ChipPAC Ltd to sell its Pathumthani, Thailand semiconductor assembly and test operations for $100 million.

In October 2007, LSI Corporation acquired Tarari, a maker of silicon and software, for $85 million in cash.

That month, LSI Corporation completed its sale of its Mobility Division to Infineon Technologies AG (Munich) for €330 million in cash. Approximately 700 LSI employees transferred to Infineon in the deal.

In April 2009, LSI Corporation bought the 3ware RAID adapter business of Applied Micro Circuits Corporation.

In July 2009, LSI Corporation acquires NAS vendor ONStor, Inc. for $25 million.

In March 2011, LSI Corporation announced its sale of its Engenio external storage systems business to NetApp for $480 million in cash. The sale of the Engenio division, which generated revenues of $705 million in 2010, completed in May.

In January 2012, LSI Corporation completed the acquisition of SandForce, which produced flash memory controllers (for $370 million reported in October 2011). LSI started producing its own PCIe cards for data center servers, using SandForce's flash controller chips, under their new Nytro product line that April. This included three different products: LSI Nytro WarpDrive Application Acceleration Cards, LSI Nytro XD Application Acceleration Storage Solution, and LSI Nytro MegaRAID Application Acceleration Cards.

In December 2012, LSI Corporation transferred its stock listing from NYSE: LSI to NASDAQ (Global Select Market): LSI.

On December 16, 2013, Avago Technologies (which later acquired Broadcom Corporation, then renamed itself as Broadcom Ltd., then in 2018 changed its name to Broadcom Inc.) announced it would be acquiring LSI Corporation for $6.6 billion in cash. The transaction closed on May 6, 2014.
