= Symbios Logic =

- Founded: February 15, 1995 (as independent subsidiary)
- Defunct: August 1998
- Fate: Acquired by LSI Logic
- Website: symbios.com at the Wayback Machine (archived 1997-01-24)

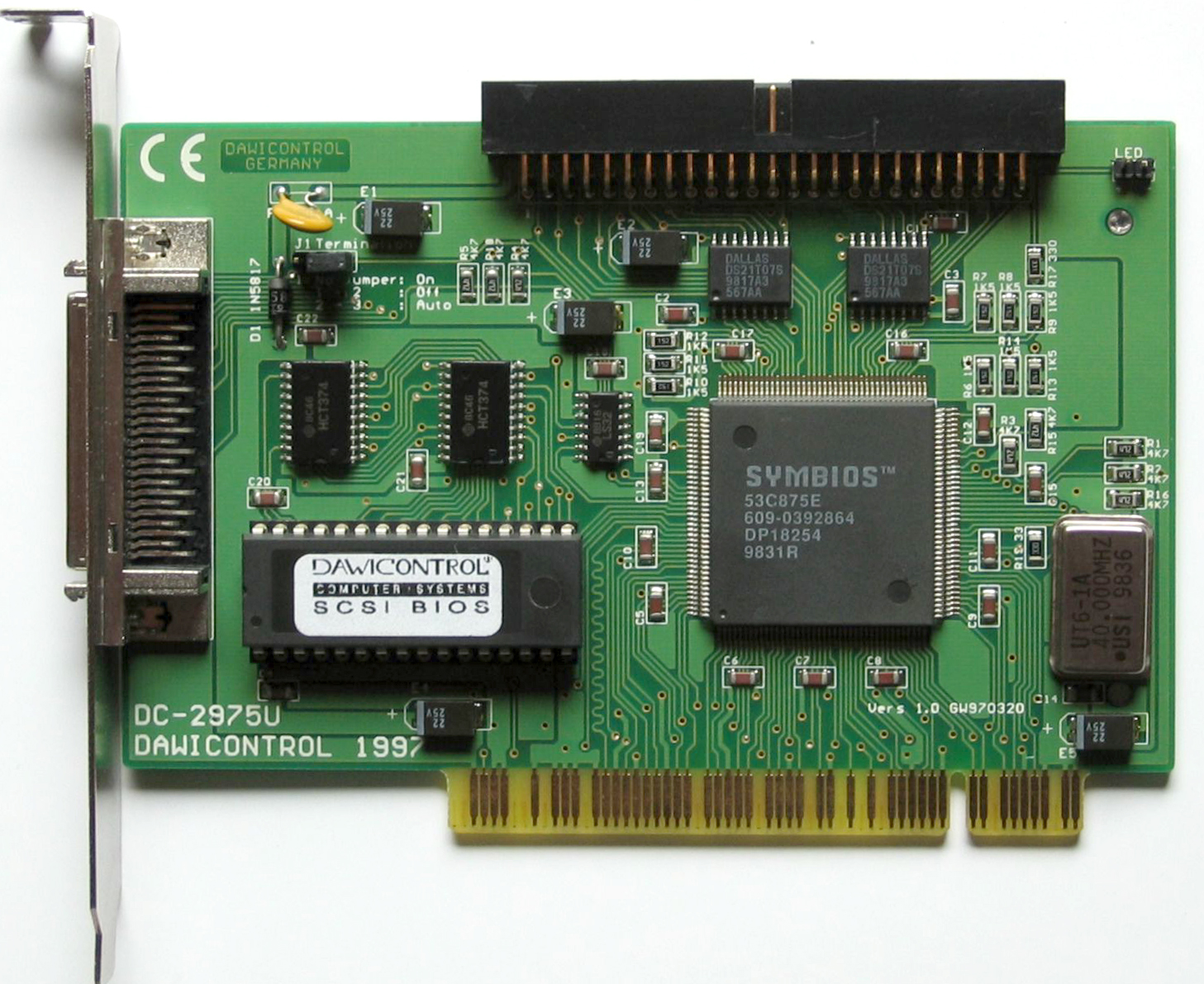
SCSI Host Bus Adapter with Symbios Chipset

Symbios Logic Inc. was a manufacturer of SCSI host adapter chipsets and disk array storage subsystems.

== Background ==
It was originally established as the NCR Microelectronics division of NCR Corporation in 1972, before NCR's takeover by AT&T Corporation in 1991.

== History ==
In 1995, AT&T sold off the division to Hyundai Electronics (later known as Hynix) which established the name Symbios Logic. In July 1998 Hyundai sold Symbios (then headquartered in Fort Collins, Colorado) to LSI Logic for $760 million cash.

=== Post acquisition ===
In November 2000, LSI acquired Syntax Systems, and in August 2001 the groups merged to become LSI Logic Storage Systems. In 2004 its name was changed to Engenio Information Technologies, Inc. The subsidiary filed for an initial public offering on February 19, 2004. At the time, Engenio's chief executive was Thomas Georgens, and its headquarters were in Milpitas, California. After a number of delays, the request was withdrawn in August 2004.

On March 9, 2011, LSI announced its sale of its Engenio storage group to NetApp for $480 million in cash. The sale of the Engenio division, which generated revenues of $705 million in 2010, completed in May.
