= Dazzle (video recorder) =

External video capture device

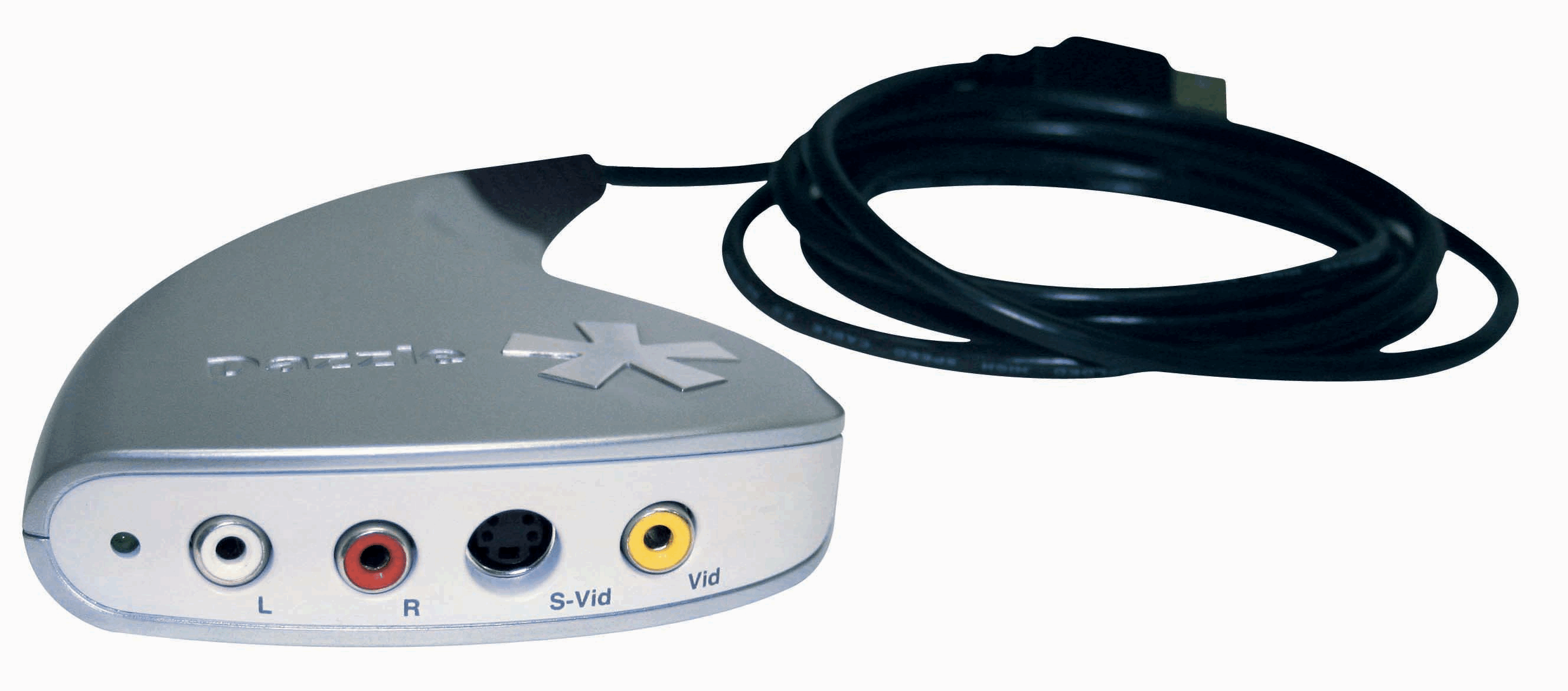
- A Dazzle video recorder with its audio, video, and S-Video slots
- Manufacturer: Dazzle Multimedia (1997–1999); SCM Microsystems (1999–2003); Pinnacle Systems (2003–present)
- Introduced: December 1997
- Type: Video recorder

The Dazzle is a family of external video capture devices that allow people to record video from analog composite video sources (DVD player, VCR, etc.) over USB (originally parallel). Most models are also capable of recording analog stereo audio.

== Setup ==
There are two different ways one can connect components to the Dazzle. One way is to connect a VCR or video game console directly into the unit with RCA composite cables or with an S-video cable. Another way is to use three composite splitters to split the AV signal, sending one into the Dazzle, and another to a TV. This method is popular for recording from video game consoles, since it provides a real time feed into a TV (used as a preview monitor) while simultaneously capturing the footage.

== History ==
The Dazzle line of video recorders was introduced in 1997 by L.A. Vision, Inc., a Silicon Valley start-up founded by Paul Jain, who had previously founded a string of graphics card companies including Paradise Systems, Video Seven, and Media Vision. The initial line of Dazzle recorders used an MPEG-1 encoder/decoder chip by C-Cube Microsystems to digitize the analog input, interfacing with the computer via a parallel port cable. The maximum resolution and frame rate that the Dazzle could encode video at was 352×240 pixels at 30 fps. L.A. Vision had inked their deal with C-Cube in September 1997; within two months, the Dazzle line was available on the market, by which point the company had renamed themselves to Dazzle Multimedia. Dazzle Multimedia also sold an internal, PCI-card version of the Dazzle, under the name Snazzi. Dazzle Multimedia was acquired in majority by SCM Microsystems, a German-American technology company, in 1999.

The first Dazzle recorder to support USB was the Digital Video Creator (DVC) 50 and 80 models, first released in March 2001. The DVC 80 was capable of recording both video and audio via RCA and S-video, while the more inexpensive DVC 50 was capable of recording only video. Owing to their USB 1.1 interface, these Dazzle video recorders captured video at much lower resolutions than contemporary offerings which used FireWire, although they were still capable of capturing video at a stable 30 fps.

In October 2003, Pinnacle Systems acquired the rights to manufacture and market Dazzle hardware from SCM Microsystems. Pinnacle was in turn acquired by Avid Technology in 2005. The Dazzle was then sold under both the Avid and Pinnacle names across various products. In the late 2000s, Avid updated the Dazzle line to support USB 2.0, allowing it to capture at native NTSC video resolutions.

In 2012, Corel acquired Pinnacle from Avid. As of April 2022, Corel continues to sell products under the Dazzle family.

== Hardware overview ==
In this table the different Dazzle hardware devices are listed by their number.

In general a device was always sold under the same name and packaging. Not the DVC 100, many versions of the device and the packaging existed. Only the 'Dazzle DVD Recorder HD' is sold today and has different internal hardware than the DVC 100, but also outputs uncompressed video.

Name	Version	Device colour	Package names (colour)	Release date	USB	Video codec	Audio codec	Connectors	Drivers
DVC		grey	Dazzle Digital Video Creator (green/gold)						
Fusion									32bit
DVC 80		black	Dazzle Digital Video Creator 80 (white)		1.0			RCA/S-Video in	32bit
DVC 85								RCA/S-Video in	32bit
DVC 90		blue (bright), blue (bright)	Dazzle Digital Video Creator 90 (white), Dazzle MovieCompressor 2006 (white)		2.0			RCA/S-Video in	32bit
DVC 100	100	red (yellow star), white (silver star), white (silver star), black	Dazzle DVD Recorder (red), Dazzle DVD Recorder (green), Dazzle Video Creator Platinum HD (blue-silver), Dazzle DVD Recorder HD (red)		2.0	uncompressed	uncompressed	RCA/S-Video in	32/64bit
DVC 101	100		Dazzle DVD Recorder (?) ?		2.0	uncompressed	uncompressed	RCA/S-Video in	32/64bit
DVC 103	100				2.0	uncompressed	uncompressed	RCA/S-Video in	32/64bit
DVC 107	100	black (silver star)	Dazzle Video Creator Plus (silver)		2.0	uncompressed	uncompressed	RCA/S-Video in	32/64bit
Dazzle Video Capture USB v1.0	100	black (matt)	Dazzle DVD Recorder HD (red)	2016	2.0	uncompressed	uncompressed	RCA/S-Video in	64bit (different ones!)
DVC 120		black	Dazzle Digital Video Creator 120 (white)					RCA/S-Video in	32bit
DVC 130		blue	Dazzle Video Creator (blue)		2.0	MPEG1/2	MP2	RCA/S-Video in	32bit
DVC 150	150b	black	Dazzle Digital Video Creator 150 (white)	2002	2.0	MPEG1/2	MP2	RCA/S-Video in and out	32bit
DVC 170		silver (silver star)	Dazzle Video Creator Platinum (blue)	2006	2.0	MPEG1/2/4	MP2 ?	RCA/S-Video in	32bit
DCS 200		black	Dazzle DVD Creation Station 200		1.1			RCA/S-Video in and out	32bit
