= Wilfred Corrigan =

British engineer

Wilfred J. Corrigan
- Born: Liverpool, England
- Occupation(s): CEO of Fairchild Semiconductor and founder of LSI Logic

Wilfred J. Corrigan is a British engineer and entrepreneur, known for founding and running LSI Logic Corp. He was the chairman and chief executive of LSI for over two decades until 2005, during the earlier part of which he made vital contributions to the company. He was the founder and served twice as chairman of the Semiconductor Industry Association (SIA). Corrigan is a veteran of Fairchild Semiconductor.

== Life and career ==
He was born in Liverpool, England, as the son of a dock worker, graduated with a degree in chemical engineering from the Imperial College of Science before starting his career at Motorola Semiconductor. He later joined Fairchild Semiconductor, rising through the ranks to eventually become president and CEO for five years. He left Fairchild in 1979 after selling the then ailing company to Schlumberger, an oilfield services firm.

As the founder of LSI Logic, Corrigan pioneered modern-day gate array, standard-cell application-specific integrated circuit (ASIC), system-on-a-chip and platform ASIC businesses. Before founding LSI Logic, Corrigan spearheaded the growth of Fairchild Camera and Instrument Corporation as chairman, president, and chief executive officer and earlier as its vice president and general manager of its Semiconductor Division. Corrigan is also an inventor and holds two U.S. patents related to field-effect device manufacturing and gas etching.

In 1990, Corrigan testified before the United States House Committee on Energy and Commerce about foreign competition in semiconductor manufacture.

He is a recipient of the SIA's Robert N. Noyce Medal, Semico Research's Bellwether Award and the Silicon Valley Leadership Group's Lifetime Achievement Award. He also is a member of the board of directors of the Semiconductor Industry Association, a Fellow of the Royal Academy of Engineering, Imperial College London and London's City and Guild Institute and a driving force in the establishment of the World Semiconductor Council.
