= Elliptic Labs =

Norwegian technology company

Elliptic Laboratories ASA
- Company type: Public limited
- Traded as: Oslo Stock Exchange: EIP
- Industry: Technology
- Founded: 2006; 20 years ago
- Headquarters: Oslo, Norway
- Key people: Laila Danielsen (president, CEO, and co-founder); Svenn-Tore Larsen (chairman)
- Products: Sensor systems
- Revenue: ▲US$11.6 million (2024)
- Net income: ▲US$0.8 million (2024)
- Number of employees: 88 (2024)
- Website: ellipticlabs.com

Elliptic Laboratories ASA (Elliptic Labs) is a Norwegian technology company based in Oslo that develops software-based sensor systems. The company was founded in 2006 as a spin-off from a University of Oslo research project, and has been listed on the main market of the Oslo Stock Exchange (OSE) since 2022.

== History ==
Elliptic Labs was founded in 2006 as a research project at the University of Oslo. It developed its technology to equip mobile devices and other products with touchless gesture and presence detection. The company gradually introduced various virtual sensor solutions, such as touchless gesture control and human presence detection in smartphones and laptops.

The company went public in October 2020. In 2022, the company was transferred from the Nordic Growth Market and Euronext Growth Oslo stock exchanges to the main market of Oslo Børs.

In the 2010s and early 2020s, the company's focus was on series production and integration of the technology into partner devices.

The company is headquartered in Oslo, Norway, and has additional offices in the United States (San Francisco), China (Shanghai), Taiwan, and Japan. Co-founder Laila Danielsen has been at the helm of the company for years.

== Activities ==
Elliptic Labs is developing an AI Virtual Smart Sensor Platform that uses ultrasonic waves, artificial intelligence, and sensor fusion to replace conventional hardware sensors. The company's proprietary software analyzes incoming sound signals in the device's environment and uses them to recognize 3D gestures and the presence of people. The product is primarily aimed at the markets for smartphones, laptops, IoT devices, and automobiles. The platform enables software-based detection in smartphones (proximity sensor), whereby the screen automatically turns off and the touch function is deactivated when the device is held up to the ear.

== Customers and partners ==
The technology is used via license agreements with device manufacturers. Lenovo and other PC vendors have integrated the software into their ThinkPad notebooks to implement features such as "Smart Share" screen-sharing via tap sensor. Major chip companies are also working with Elliptic Labs: in 2022, the company announced a partnership with AMD to use the sensor platform in AMD Ryzen laptops. In 2025, a collaboration with Intel followed, with the goal of integrating the Elliptic platform on Intel Core Ultra systems and Evo platforms.

The Elliptic platform is already in use in over 500 million devices worldwide, including mobile devices from Chinese manufacturers such as VIVO and Huawei.
