= C-Cube =

Video compression semiconductor company

C-Cube Microsystems, Inc.
- Type: Public company
- Traded as: Nasdaq: CUBE
- Industry: Semiconductors
- Founded: August 8, 1988 as a California corporation
- Fate: Acquired by LSI Logic in March 2001
- Headquarters: Milpitas, California
- Key people: Edmund Sun, co-founder Alex Balkanski, co-founder Bill O'Meara, CEO; Don Valentine, Chairman
- Products: Video compression semiconductors and subsystems
- Website: c-cube.com at the Wayback Machine (archived 2001-02-02)

C-Cube Microsystems, Inc., was an early company in video compression technology as well as the implementation of that technology into semiconductor integrated circuits and systems. C-Cube was the first company to deliver on the market opportunity presented by the conversion of image and video data from analog to digital formats enabling markets such as VideoCD, DVD, DirecTV, digital cable, and non-linear editing systems.

== History ==
C-Cube was founded on August 8, 1988 by Edmund Sun from Weitek and Alexandre Balkanski. Early funding came from VC firms Hambrecht & Quist and JAFCO America Ventures as well as Japanese farm equipment manufacturer Kubota Ltd.

Image and video technology was just beginning to make the transition from analog (VHS, Betamax, etc.) to new digital-base formats. The key issue was the amount of bandwidth required to transmit or store the digital content. Digital video compression was a key enabling technology that made digital video practical. C-Cube engineers drove the early standards for digital compression, including Eric Hamilton, chair of the JPEG committee, and Didier LeGall, chair of the MPEG video committee. As a result of their familiarity with the standardization process and the standards themselves, C-Cube was able to gain advantageous knowledge in the implementation of the algorithms into high-performance silicon.

Early on, the company was recognized for technical leadership but was largely unable to turn leadership into revenues and profits. The company found focus with the hiring of Bill O'Meara as CEO in 1991. He hired a new professional management staff and procured $10 million in added investment from Sequoia Capital, Texas Instruments, and AMD in late 1992 and enabled the company to drive toward profitability based on the development of products including the CL550 JPEG codec, the CL950 MPEG II (prototype) decoder, and the CL450 MPEG I decoder.

These early-to-market devices proved the concept of digital video compression to a number of large OEM customers and led to the development of next-generation industry-enabling products including the CL4000 MPEG II encoder family that enabled the DirecTV program from Hughes and the CL480 MPEG I decoder that drove the VideoCD market in Japan and China in the mid 1990s.

C-Cube went public on the NASDAQ exchange under the symbol CUBE in 1994. Its board of directors included chairman Don Valentine of Sequoia Capital, T. J. Rodgers of Cypress Semiconductor, and Gregorio Reyes of Sandisk. O'Meara retired in 1995, turning over the office to founder Alex Balkanski. Balkanski was responsible for incubating video compression equipment company DiviCom starting in 1993 and C-Cube eventually acquired them in 1996. After this acquisition, the company changed its focus from strictly semiconductors to being both a chip and system supplier. Other acquisitions bolstered PC driver software and reference design expertise including the purchase of the software driver unit of Ring Zero as well as Media Computer Technologies (MCT) in 1995. Umesh Padval was brought in to run C-Cube Semiconductor in 1998.

During the late 1990s, C-Cube was unable to repeat its runaway hits seen earlier in the decade. The company sold its DiviCom division to Harmonic Lightwaves in May, 2000 for nearly $1.7 billion. C-Cube Semiconductor (Nasdaq CUBED) was eventually sold to competitor LSI Logic in March 2001 in a stock transaction worth $878 million. LSI sold off the consumer products business (including what was C-Cube) to Magnum Semiconductor in 2007.

== Products ==
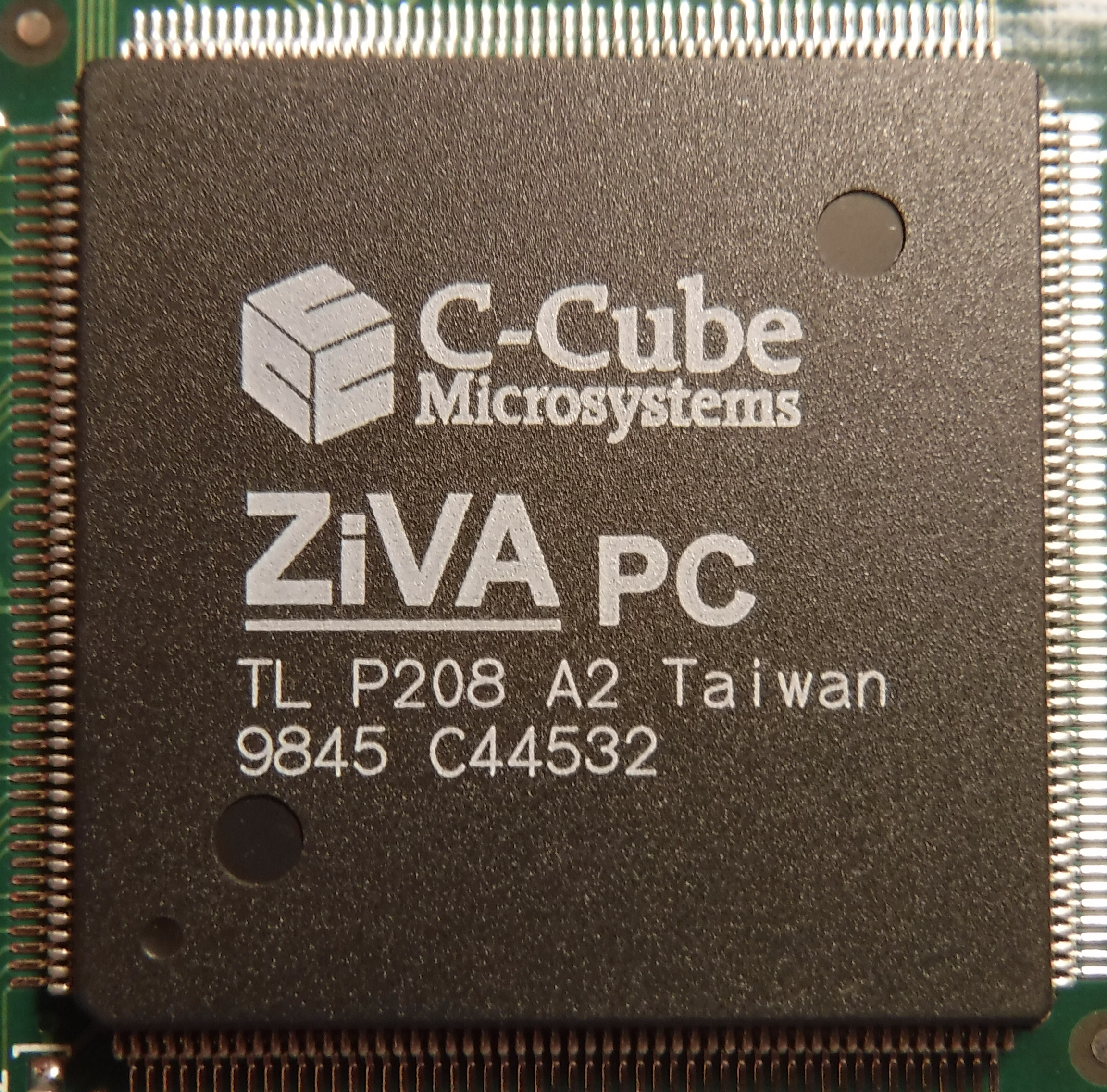
C-Cube ZiVA-PC video decoder

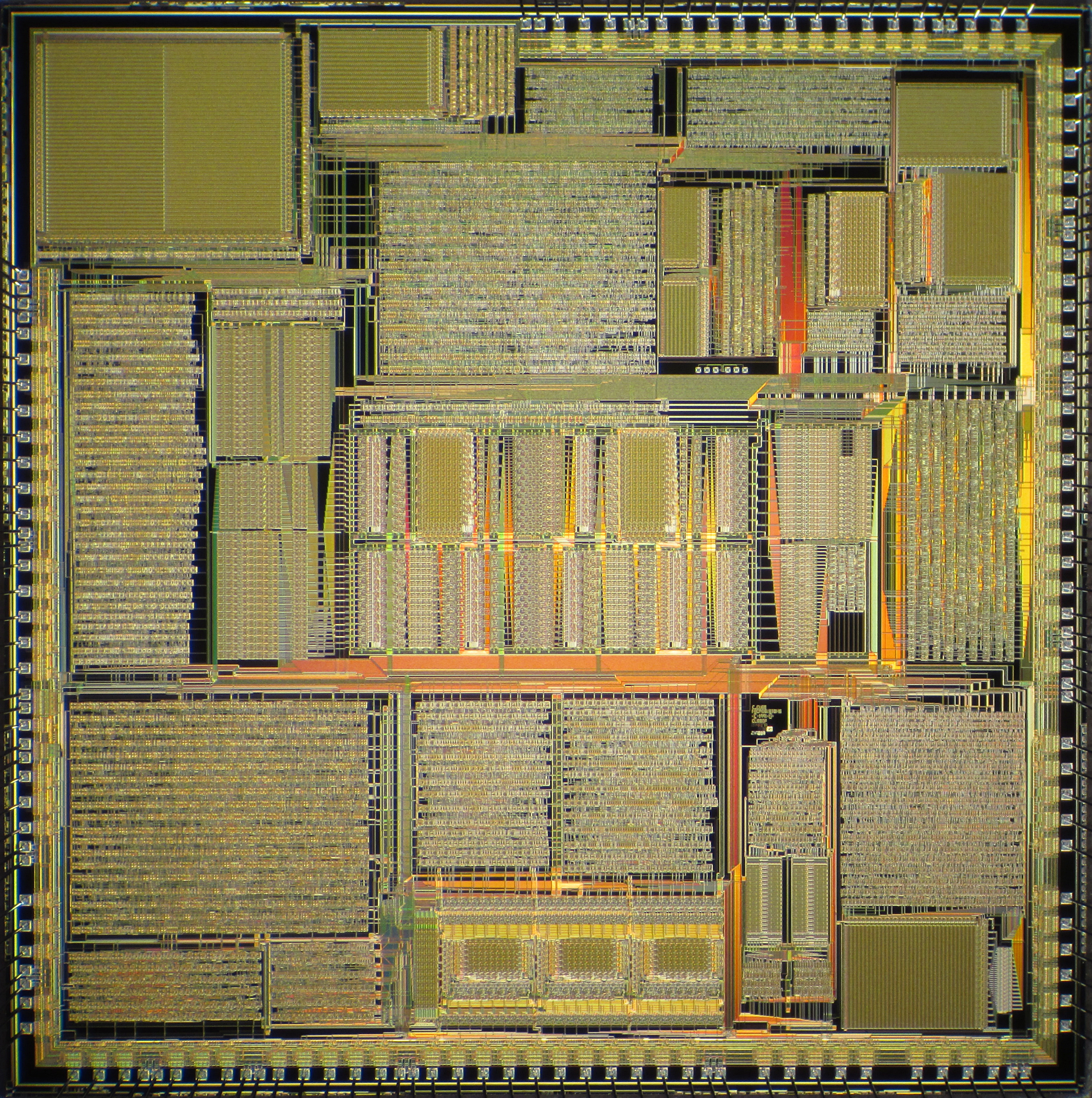
Die of C-Cube CL550

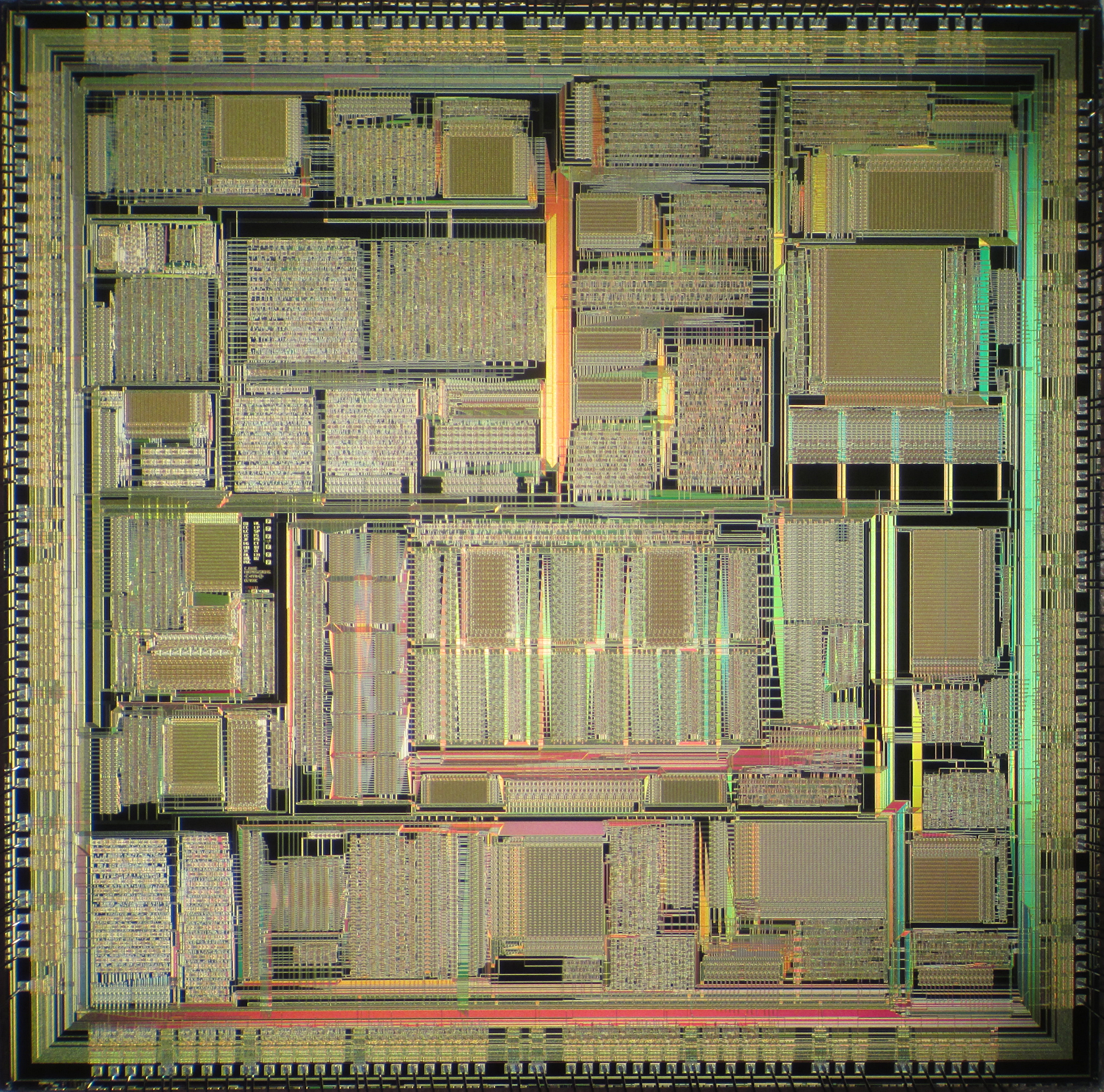
Die of C-Cube CL950

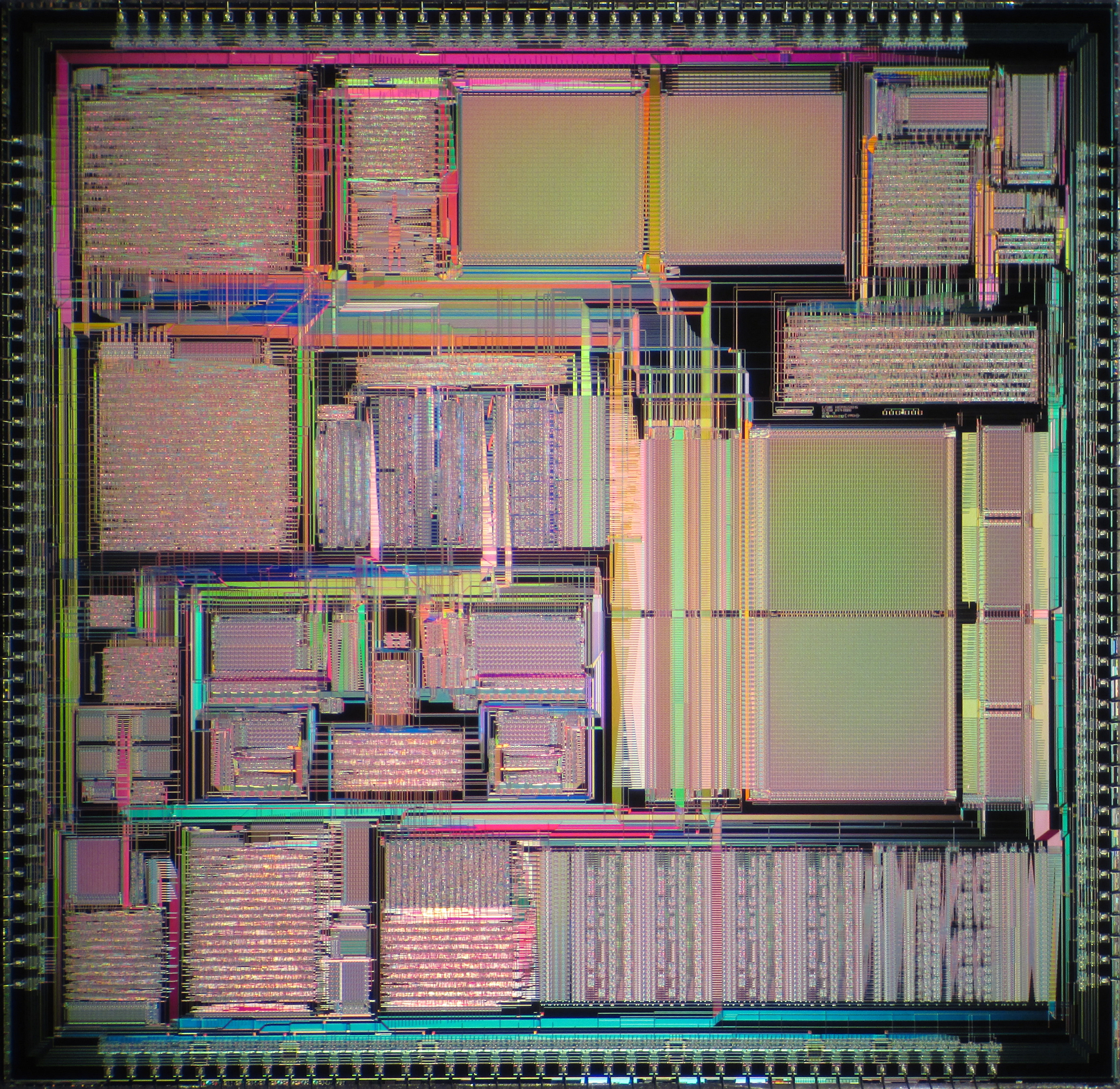
Die of C-Cube CL4000

Product	Year	Features
CL550 JPEG codec	1990	World's first 'real-time' JPEG codec; Used in digital cameras, color printers and scanners and video editing systems; Sold as a component for integration into independent products; also available integrated in a $4,000 expansion card for PC/AT-based systems or a $3,000 card for Macintosh systems; Available in the Compression Master expansion card for PC and Mac systems priced at $995
CL950 MPEG-1 video decoder	1991	World's first single-chip MPEG-1 video decoder; Capable of decoding full-screen (720×480) real time (30 frame/s) images; First C-Cube chip driven by programmable microcode; Used primarily as a demonstration vehicle, never entered full production
CL450 MPEG-1 video decoder	1992	World's first production MPEG-1 video decoder; Developed in conjunction with Philips for its CD-i platform; CL450i microcode variant; Used for early VideoCD development in Japan
CL4000 MPEG-1 encoder	1993	World's first real-time MPEG-1 video encoder chipset; Contained 1.2M transistors per chip; Up to eight chips were used for 'full screen' (720×480) resolution; Enabled the launch of the DirecTV program by RCA/Thomson; Enabled the development of mass content for VideoCDs and digital karaoke in the Far East
CL9100 MPEG-2 decoder	1994	Real-time MPEG-2 decoder chip; Decoded MPEG-1, MPEG-2 (simple and main profile), and General Instrument's proprietary Digicypher II; Enabled high-volume cable and satellite decoder boxes worldwide
CLM4400 (VideoRISC) MPEG-2 encoder	1994	World's first real-time MPEG-2 encoder chipset; First device based on VideoRISC architecture; Enabled deployments of cable, satellite and content authoring for the upcoming DVD market.; CLM4200 codec variant for video conferencing, designed with PictureTel; CLM4440 variant for multimedia authoring; CLM4550 MPEG-1 variant for real-time communications and authoring for games and entertainment; CLM4720 storage encoder to format video for video file servers and broadcast automation applications
CL480 MPEG-1 decoder	1994	High-volume, low cost MPEG-1 decoder for the VideoCD market; Co-developed with JVC and Philips; Enabled a huge upsurge for the VideoCD platform in Japan, Korea and China; Microcode variant, the CL480PC enabled large-scale deployment of digital video on the PC
CLM4111 MPEG-1 encoder	1997	A low-cost encoder for desktop video creation and editing at the price level of a "quality graphics card"; Incorporated into digital video creation peripherals such as those from Dazzle Multimedia
DVx single chip MPEG-2 codec	1997	First single chip MPEG-2 codec; Followed up by DVxpress in 1998 for digital video production
