= Crystal Semiconductor =

Defunct American computer hardware company

Crystal Semiconductor Corporation
- Company type: Private (1984–1991); Subsidiary (after 1991)
- Industry: Computer; Semiconductor
- Founded: 1984; 42 years ago in Austin, Texas, United States
- Founders: Michael J. Callahan; James H. Clardy
- Defunct: 2002; 24 years ago
- Fate: Acquired by Cirrus Logic in 1991; absorbed into Cirrus Logic c. 2002
- Number of employees: 429 (1995)
- Website: crystal.com at the Wayback Machine (archived April 7, 1997)

Crystal Semiconductor Corporation was an American computer company based in Austin, Texas, and active from 1984 to the early 2000s. Founded by Michael J. Callahan and James H. Clardy, the company originally specialized in the design and manufacture of silicon for mixed-signal integrated circuits, namely digital-to-analog (DAC) and analog-to-digital (ADC) converters. After being acquired by Cirrus Logic of San Jose, California, in 1991 for about $59 million, the company became a dominant player in the personal computer sound chip market.

== History ==
=== Independent era (1984–1991) ===
Crystal Semiconductor Corporation was incorporated in 1984 by Michael J. Callahan and James H. Clardy in Austin, Texas. Callahan, the principal founder, had previously incorporated Texas Micro Engineering (TME), a fabless semiconductor firm, in Austin in 1979. Clardy meanwhile was a 21-year veteran designer at Texas Instruments before co-founding Crystal. Immediately after forming Crystal, Callahan transferred TME's assets over to his new company. Unlike TME, Crystal was a full-on semiconductor fabricator, the company groundbreaking a 10,000-square-foot plant in Austin with the US$5 million of capital they had initially raised. The company initially focused on the production of digital-to-analog (DAC) and analog-to-digital (ADC) integrated circuits for use in telecommunications, computers, and automobile stereos; the production of such converters constituted a US$600-million industry at the time. The founders hoped to reach $100 million in sales within its first five years.

Employment at Crystal grew tenfold from 1984 to 1986, the company having about 70 workers on its payroll in March 1986. The following month the company delivered their first chip, the CSC8870B—a DTMF decoder—for the telecommunications industry. Fabrication of the chip was subcontracted out to foundries in California, Canada, and Singapore. In June 1986, Crystal announced an analog circuit development system, comprising an in-circuit emulation application for the IBM PC—dubbed the Crystal-ICE Filter Development System—and the company's new CSC7008 filter chip. This development system was featured on the front cover of Electronic Design magazine. In January 1987, by which point Crystal had 85 employees. Asahi Kasei, a Japanese chemical and electronics conglomerate, purchased an eight-percent stake in Crystal in exchange for flushing the company with new capital.

Within 1988, the company had grown by 300 percent and reached 100 employees by October that year. In that same month the company was commissioned by an alliance of airline companies for the design of an analog ASIC that could gauge wind shear threats for both pilots and air traffic controllers—a feature of fly-by-wire systems that had recently been mandated by the FAA that year. The order for the chip was the largest the converter industry had seen up to that point. By the end of the year, Crystal generated $5.5 million in sales and employed 120 workers. Despite growth in all its departments and a tripling of overall sales, the company had yet to post a profitable quarter, and members of the board allegedly feared that Crystal was beginning to grow too fast for the amount of remaining cash reserves the company had, prompting them to layoff 15 workers in the beginning of 1989. Crystal later achieved its first profitable quarter in August 1989; afterward, the company posted nine straight profitable quarters in a row. Employment at Crystal hovered around 100 between 1989 and 1990; by May 1991 the company had grown to 150 workers.

=== Cirrus Logic era (1991–2002) ===
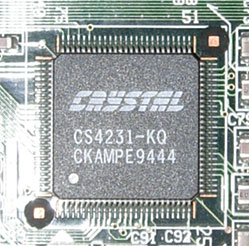
A Crystal CS4231 sound chip from 1994

The company exceeded $100 million in sales for the first time in 1991. In September 1991, Cirrus Logic, Inc., a San Jose, California–based fabless semiconductor company specializing in personal computer chips, announced the acquisition of Crystal in a stock swap worth roughly $59 million at the time. The acquisition was completed in late October 1991, the company becoming an independent subsidiary of Cirrus Logic while retaining its headquarters, name, and marketing team. After the acquisition, Crystal pivoted away from general-purpose converters to modems and sound-generating ASICs for personal computers. Prompted by growing sales and employment, between April and June 1993, the company's 350 workers moved out from their old headquarters to a new plant in Austin four times its size. Around the same time, Cirrus Logic earmarked another 45,000-square-foot plant in the area for them to occupy in January 1994.

Crystal under Cirrus Logic's ownership employed 429 in 1995. Between 1997 and 1998 the company cut 30 jobs, amid a wave of layoffs at Cirrus Logic affecting between 400 and 500 workers total. Clardy left the company in 1997, citing overbearing management from Cirrus Logic. That year, Crystal launched a lawsuit against Milpitas-based OPTi Inc. and Singapore-based TriTech Microelectronics for alleged patent infringement of Crystal's mixed-signal technology. The courts ruled in favor of Crystal in late 1999 or early 2000, ordering TriTech and OPTi to pay their portion of a combined $20 million.

In April 2000, Cirrus Logic relocated their headquarters and management from San Jose to Crystal's home of Austin, citing a pivot away from video controller chips to Crystal's specialty of audio and optical storage controller chips. By 2002, Cirrus Logic had absorbed Crystal into its base of operations and finally retired the name.
