= Cirrus Logic =

American fabless semiconductor company

Cirrus Logic Inc.
- Type: Public
- Traded as: Nasdaq: CRUS; S&P 400 component
- Industry: Semiconductors
- Founded: 1981; 45 years ago, in Salt Lake City, Utah, U.S.
- Founder: Suhas Patil
- Headquarters: Austin, Texas, U.S.
- Key people: John Forsyth (CEO); David Tupman (chairman)
- Revenue: ▼US$1.79 billion (2024)
- Operating income: ▲US$343 million (2024)
- Net income: ▲US$275 million (2024)
- Total assets: ▲US$2.23 billion (2024)
- Total equity: ▲US$1.82 billion (2024)
- Number of employees: 1,625 (2024)
- Website: cirrus.com
- Footnotes; Financials as of March 30, 2024.

Cirrus Logic Inc. is an American fabless semiconductor supplier that specializes in analog, mixed-signal, and audio DSP integrated circuits (ICs). Since 1998, the company's headquarters have been in Austin, Texas.

The company's audio processors and audio converters feature in audio and consumer entertainment products, including smartphones, tablets, laptops, digital headsets, automotive entertainment systems, home-theater receivers, and smart home applications, such as smart speakers. The company has over 3,200 customers including Ford, Harman International, Itron, LG, Lenovo, Onkyo, Marantz, Motorola, Panasonic, Pioneer, Samsung, SiriusXM, Sony, Apple, and Vizio. Apple makes up 89% of the company's revenue in 2025.

Suhas Patil founded the company as "Patil Systems, Inc." in Salt Lake City in 1981; it adopted the name "Cirrus Logic" when it moved to Silicon Valley in 1984.

Cirrus Logic has more than 3,900 patents issued and pending.

== History ==
Logo of Cirrus Logic as of 1998

Patil Systems, Inc., was founded in Salt Lake City, Utah, in 1981 by Suhas Patil, and in 1983 the company was reorganized by Patil, Kamran Elahian, and venture capitalist Fred Nazem, whose firm, Nazem and Company provided the company's initial round of financing.

Later the company was renamed Cirrus Logic when it moved to Silicon Valley in 1984 to focus on solutions for the growing PC components market. Michael Hackworth was named president and chief executive officer in January 1985, and was CEO until February 1999. The company joined the Nasdaq market listing in 1989 (symbol: CRUS).

Cirrus Logic acquired Crystal Semiconductor, a supplier of analog and mixed-signal converter ICs, in 1991. In the early 1990s, Cirrus Logic became a supplier of PC graphics chips, audio converters and chips for magnetic storage products. David D. French joined Cirrus Logic, Inc. as president and chief operating officer in June 1998 and was named chief executive officer in February 1999. Soon after joining the company, through an acquisition strategy French repositioned the company into a premier supplier of high-performance analog and digital processing chip solutions for consumer entertainment electronics, and soon afterwards, M. Yousuf Palla joined as Vice President of Operations and Manufacturing, contributing further to its success. The company announced in April 2000 that it had completed moving its headquarters to Austin, Texas. In June 2005, Cirrus Logic sold its video products operation to an investment firm, creating privately owned Magnum Semiconductor. After French resigned in March 2007, Jason Rhode, formerly the vice president and general manager of Cirrus Logic's Mixed Signal Audio Division, was named president and CEO in May 2007. In 2014, Cirrus Logic bought Wolfson Microelectronics for approximately $467 million. In 2021, Cirrus Logic acquired Lion Semiconductor for $335 million. It had a robotics partnership with the Ann Richards School, in which Cirrus Logic committed $10,000 a year for three years. In 2023, the robotics team was made up of 10 girls, which increased to 30 in 2024.

=== Ambient Technologies ===
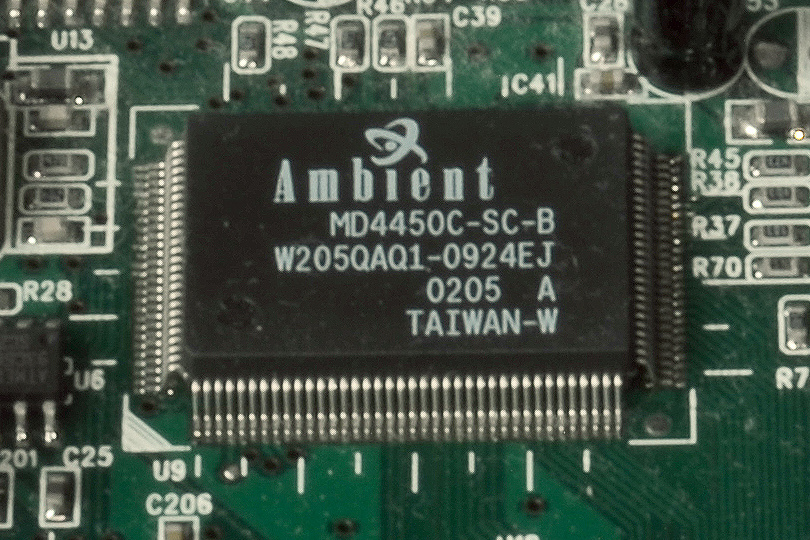
Ambient MD4450C IC on a modem board. Earlier models (CL-MD4450C) used the Cirrus Logic branding.

Following a change in focus, Cirrus Logic spun off its PC Modem business unit as Ambient Technologies in early 1999.

In early 2000, Intel purchased Ambient Technologies, subsequently renaming it its "Modem Silicon Operation" division.

=== Timeline of key events ===
- 1981 – Patil Systems Inc. is founded in Salt Lake City by Dr. Suhas Patil. Company focuses on IC solutions for the growing PC components market.
- 1984 – Patil Systems Inc. renamed Cirrus Logic and moves headquarters to Silicon Valley.
- 1989 – Company goes public and is listed on the Nasdaq exchange under the ticker symbol CRUS.
- 1991 – Cirrus Logic acquires Crystal Semiconductor, a supplier of analog and mixed-signal converter ICs.
- 1992 – Cirrus Logic completes deal for Acumos Inc.
- 1994 – Cirrus Logic entered an expansion program at MiCRUS in a joint venture with IBM.
- 1995 – Cirrus Logic agreed on a $600 million joint manufacturing venture with AT&T Microelectronics.
- 1995 – A joint development agreement was signed between Cirrus Logic and Advanced Telecommunications Modules, Ltd.
- 1998 – Cirrus Logic exits from the PC graphics card business.
- 1998 – David D. French joins company as president and chief operating officer in June and becomes chief executive officer in February 1999. In the fall, company spins out its communication business unit.
- 1999 – Cirrus Logic teams up with Microsoft Corp. in a technology agreement for its Maverick TM chip line.
- 1999 – Cirrus Logic joined Rockwell International Corp. in a collaboration for system-on-a-chip ICs using RISC processor cores from ARM Ltd. for industrial automation.
- 1999 - Cirrus Logic purchases AudioLogic, receiving PWM, multi-bit converter, and DSP technology
- 2000 – Cirrus Logic moves its headquarters to Austin, Texas.
- 2001 - Cirrus Logic purchases Peak Audio, and becomes owner of CobraNet distributed audio
- 2001 – Cirrus Logic announces plan to begin exit from magnetic storage chip business.
- 2001 – Cirrus Logic acquires several start-up companies with technologies in video decoding, video encoding, wireless networking, and networked digital audio.
- 2003 – Cirrus Logic closes wireless networking operations.
- 2005 – Cirrus Logic sells video product assets to investment firm, creating Magnum Semiconductor (company maintains minority equity position).
- 2006 – Cirrus Logic developed a reference design for a High Definition mainstream audio/video reliever (HD-AVR) platform together with Genesis Microchip Inc..
- 2007 – Jason Rhode, formerly vice president and general manager of Cirrus' Mixed-Signal Audio division, is named president and chief executive officer, replacing French who resigned in March. In July, Cirrus Logic acquires Apex Microtechnology, a provider of high-power products for industrial and aerospace markets. Cirrus Logic acquires audio chip company Tripath after it went bankrupt.
- 2012 – Company sells its hybrid product line in Tucson, Arizona, to a group of investors, creating Apex Microtechnology as a stand-alone company once again. In November, the company announces that it is moving its remaining product line team in Tucson to its Austin headquarters.
- 2012 – Cirrus Logic awarded DigiKey with the Distributor Partnership Award.
- 2014 – Cirrus Logic acquires UK-based Wolfson Microelectronics, an audio IC company founded in 1984.
- 2018 – Cirrus Logic signed an agreement with Apple for an active noise reduction chip for the next-generation AirPods.
- 2019 – Cirrus Logic became a strategic partner with Silicon Catalyst.
- 2021 – Jason Rhode steps down as CEO to be replaced by John Forsyth who was previously chief strategy officer.
- 2021 – Cirrus Logic announced a collaboration with Elliptic Labs to optimize the CS35L45 smart boosted amplifier using the Elliptic Labs’ AI Virtual Smart Sensor Platform.

== Graphics history ==
In the early 1990s, Cirrus Logic was a supplier of low-cost PC graphics chips. Cirrus's Microsoft Windows 2D GUI accelerators (GDI) were among the fastest in the low-end market-segment, outperforming competing VGA chips from Oak Technologies, Trident Microsystems, and Paradise (Western Digital). For example, the Cirrus GD5422 (1992) supported hardware acceleration for both 8-bit color and 16-bit color. It was one of the lowest-priced SVGA controllers to support both.

By the mid-1990s, when PCs had migrated to the PCI bus, Cirrus had fallen behind S3 and Trident Microsystems. When the announced release date of the GD5470 "Mondello" came and went, Cirrus's reputation in desktop PC-graphics suffered. Mondello development took a back seat to the GD5464 which was near completion and proved to be a much faster design with the use of Rambus. (Because of this Mondello never got off the ground.)

The company's final graphics chips, the GD546x "Laguna" series of PCI/AGP 3D-accelerators, were novel in that they were one of the few video cards to use Rambus RDRAM. The patented use of tiled memory by the GD546x chips is still used by nearly all graphics processors today. However, like many other 2D and 3D chips at the time were gate limited by the process technology available at the time, the feature set of perspective-correct texture mapping, bilinear filtering, single-pass lighting, gouraud shading, and alpha blending, was incomplete compared to the next generation of 3D chips. The GD546x family was limited by CPU processing at the time, CPUs could not feed it enough triangles which was the real performance block. The raw processing power of the GD546x was nearly 2.5 million 25 pixel triangles per second, much faster than competitors.

When Intel announced it was entering the 3D market with the i740, Cirrus Logic exited the market, which at the time for Cirrus Logic was worth 500 million dollars annually. (Intel didn't catch up in performance for many years, the i740 was not widely accepted and did not win any major designs).

Cirrus Logic graphic cards are used in emulators. Both QEMU and Bochs emulate the Cirrus CLGD 5446 PCI VGA-card, with Bochs additionally emulating the CL-GD5430 ISA card.

=== Graphics chipsets ===
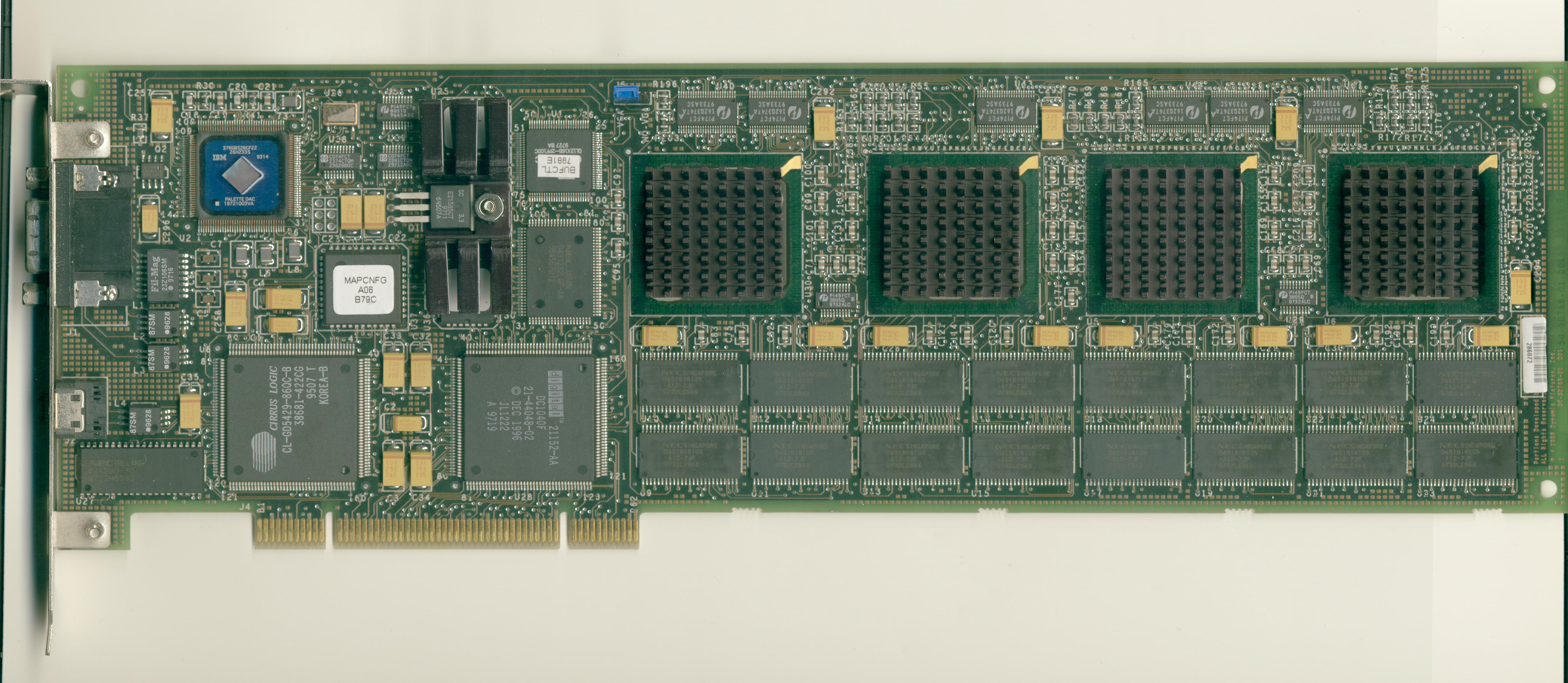
3DLabs Oxygen 402 PCI with CL-GD5429

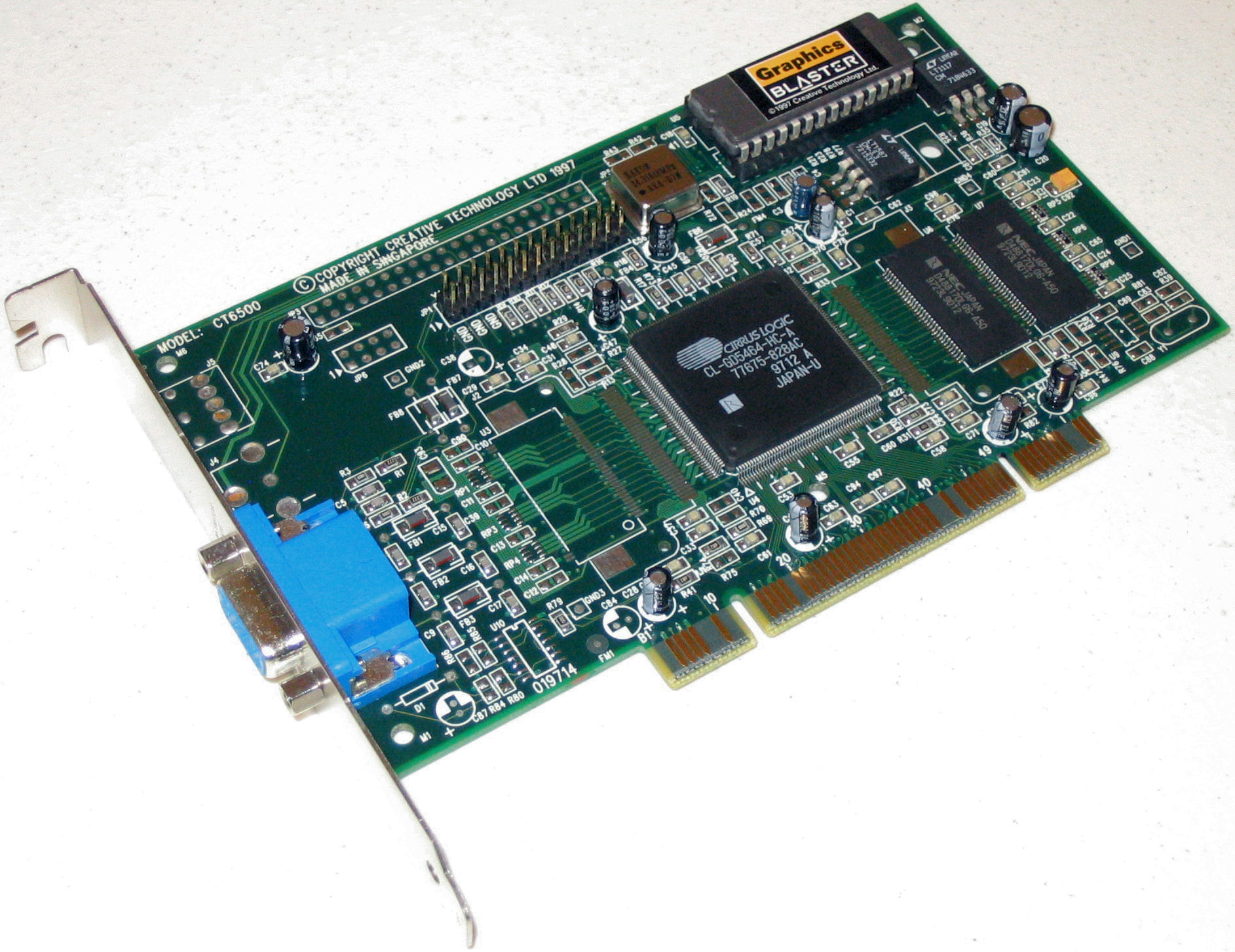
CL-GD5464 "Laguna 3D"

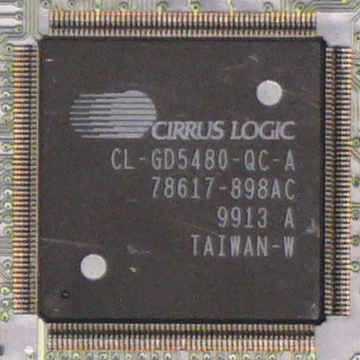
CL-GD5480

=== Desktop ===
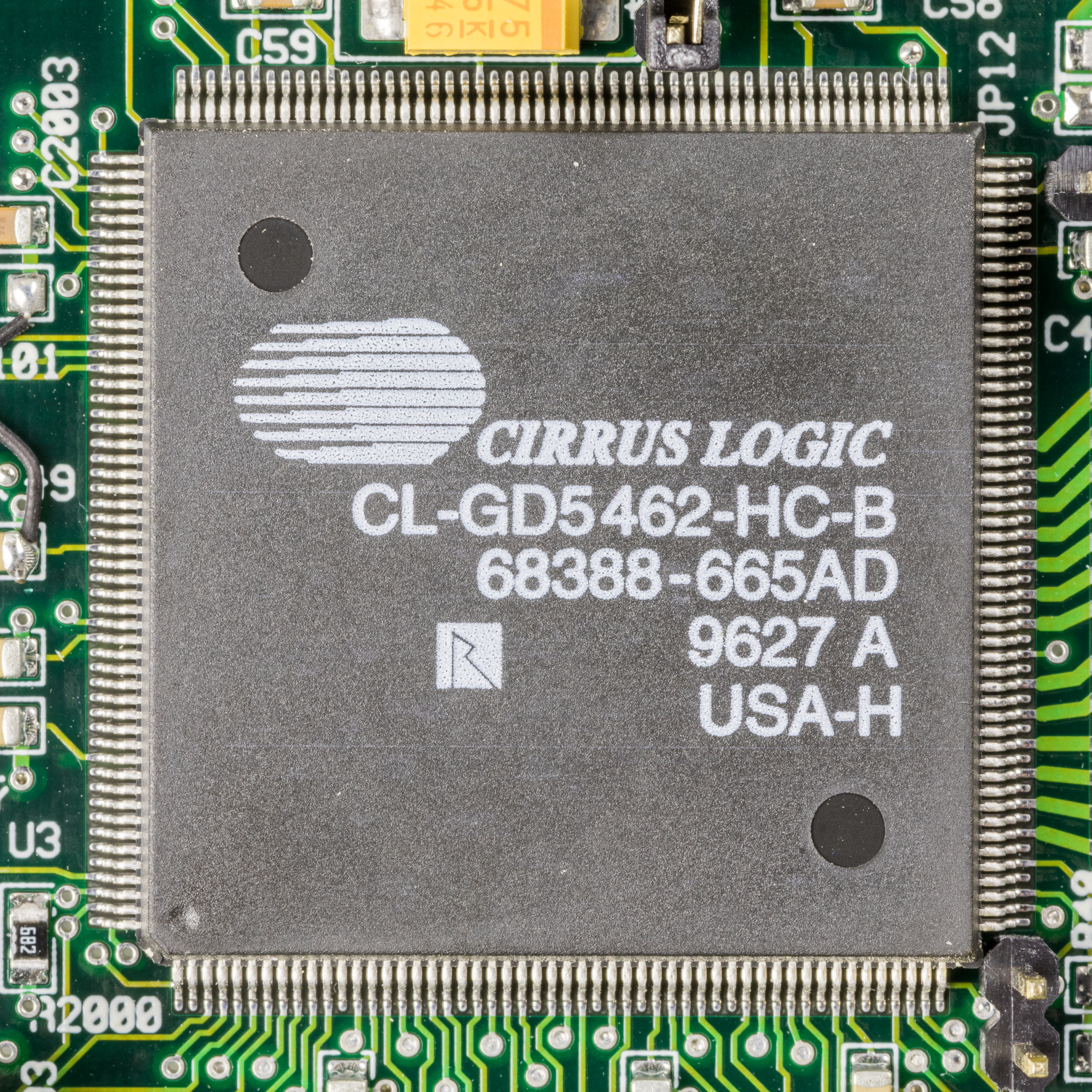
CL-GD5462

- CL-GD410 + CL-GD420 – ISA SVGA chipset, Video Seven VEGA VGA (1987)
- CL-GD510 + CL-GD520 – ISA SVGA "Eagle II" chipset; known for 100% CGA emulation (1988)
- CL-GD5320 – ISA SVGA chipset (1990)
- CL-GD5401 – ISA SVGA chipset, also known as Acumos VGA (AVGA1)
- CL-GD5402 – ISA SVGA chipset, also known as Acumos VGA (AVGA2)
- CL-GD5410 – ISA SVGA chipset, low-to-mid-end DRAM-based cards (accelerated), some laptop chipsets. Known for integrating graphics card components into one chip (built-in RAMDAC and clock generators) at an early point. (1991)
- CL-GD5420 – ISA SVGA chipset; highly integrated (15 bit RAMDAC + PLL), 1 MB
- CL-GD5421 – ISA SVGA chipset; highly integrated (15/16 bit RAMDAC + PLL), 1 MB
- CL-GD5422 – Enhanced variant of the CL-GD5420 (32-bit internal memory interface, 15/16/24 bit RAMDAC. An ISA video card carrying this chipset offered 1280×1024 interlaced max resolution.
- CL-GD5424 – VLB variant of the CL-GD5422, but resembles the CL-GD5426 in some respects
- CL-GD5425 – True color VGA controller with TV out
- CL-GD5426 – Hardware BitBLT engine; ISA bus and VLB up to 2 MB of memory
- CL-GD5428 – Enhanced variant of the CL-GD5426; faster BITBLT engine
- CL-GD5429 – Enhanced variant of the CL-GD5428; supports higher memory clock and has memory-mapped I/O
- CL-GD5430 – Similar to CL-GD5429, but with CL-GD543x core (32-bit host interface)
- CL-GD5434 – PCI Alpine family chip with 64-bit internal memory interface; supports 64-bit mode only when equipped with 2 MB of video memory; commonly equipped with 1 MB, extendable to 2 MB (1994)
- CL-GD5436 – An optimized CL-GD5434
- CL-GD5440 – CL-GD5430 with motion-video acceleration (CL-GD54M40 has integrated filters)
- CL-GD5446 – 64-bit Alpine VisualMedia accelerator, 2D-only; adds motion-video acceleration
- CL-GD546X – The Laguna Family VisualMedia Accelerators for 2D, 3D, and video. Include a BitBLT engine, video windows, and 64×64 hardware cursor. These chips use a single channel of RDRAM memory, providing up to 600 MB/s bandwidth.
  - CL-GD5462 - No 3D acceleration
  - CL-GD5464 - Hardware 3D acceleration (PCI)
  - CL-GD5465 - AGP support
- CL-GD5480 – 64-bit Alpine accelerator with 100 MHz SGRAM. Adds MPEG-2 video acceleration.

=== Mobile ===
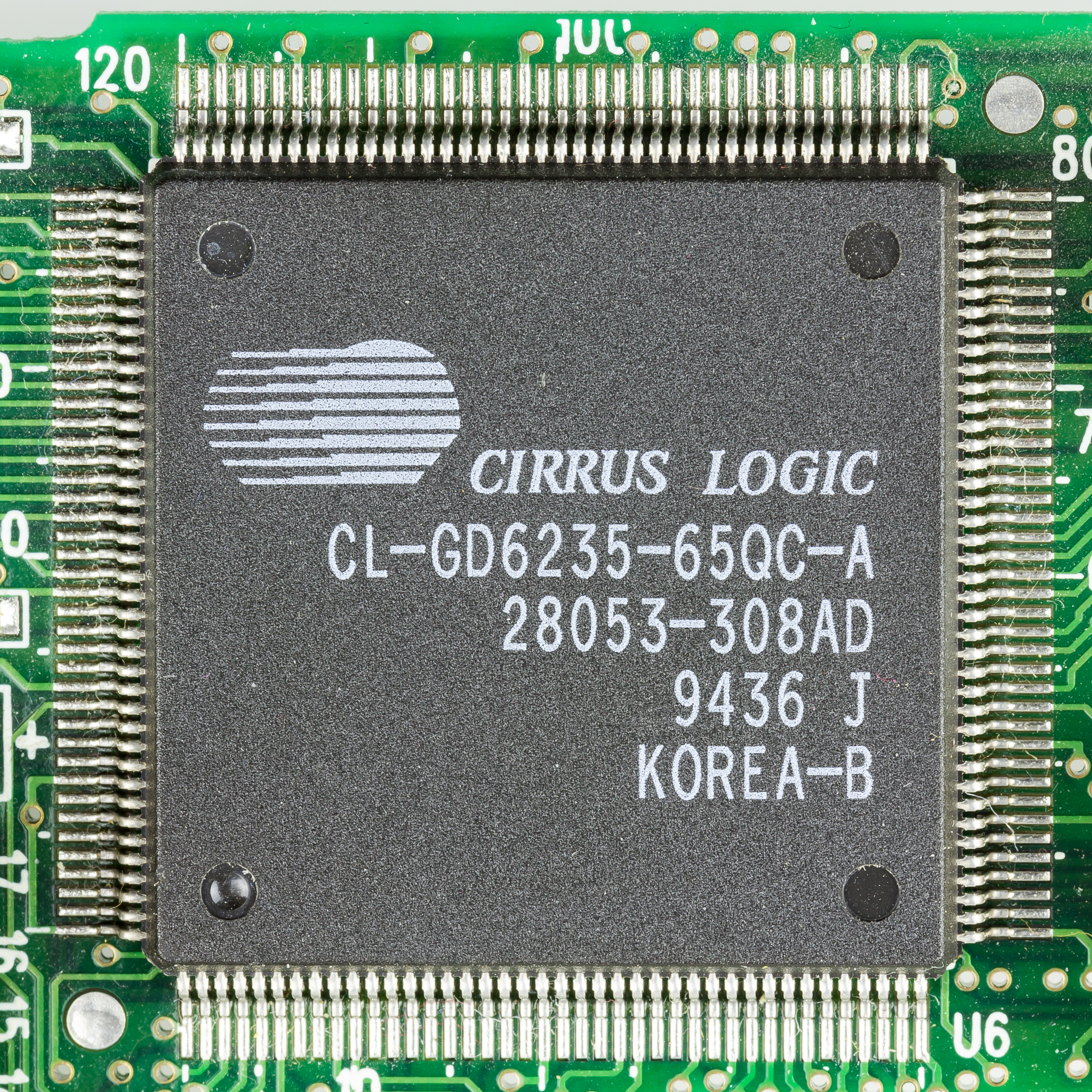
CL-GD6235

- CL-GD610 + 620 (1989)
- CL-GD6420/6440 – Used in some laptops; similar to older Cirrus chipsets (5410/AVGA2)
- CL-GD6205/6215/6225/6235 – Compatible with the CL-GD5420
- CL-GD7541/7542/7543/7548 – Compatible with the CL-GD5428/3x

== See also ==
- Graphics card
- Graphics processing unit
