= Guvcview =

Free and open source webcam application

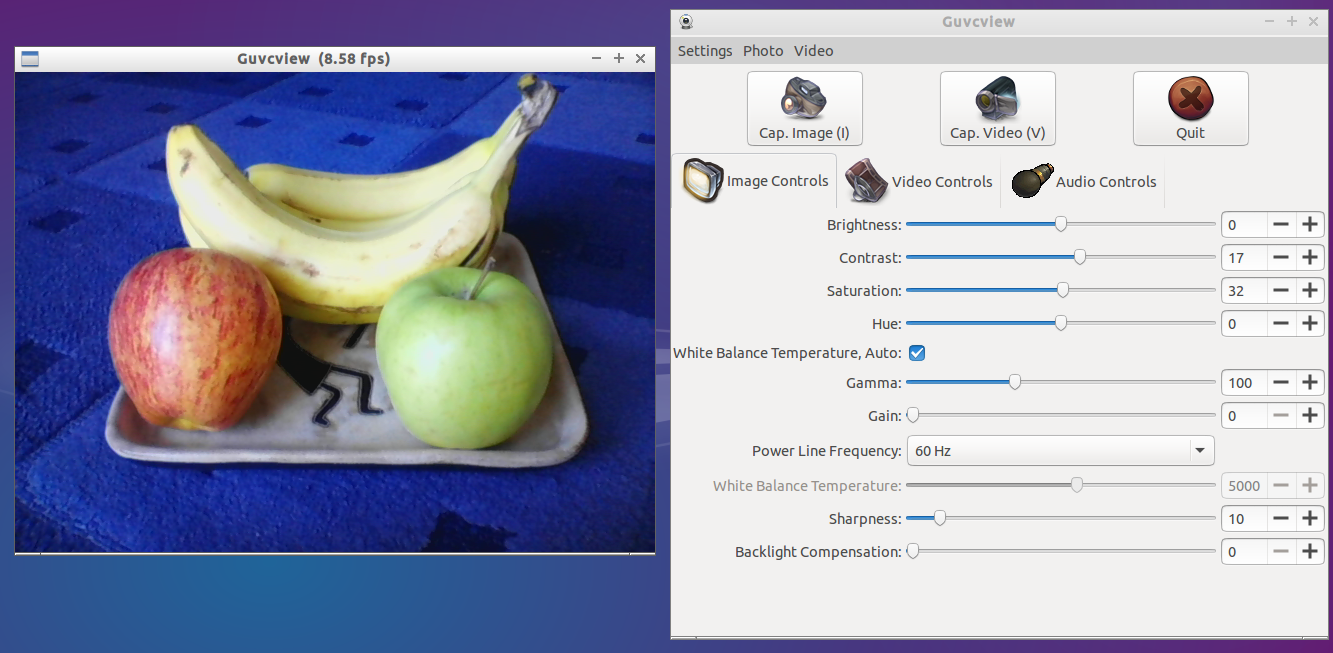
- Guvcview 2.0.1
- Original author: Paulo Assis
- Initial release: 2008; 17 years ago
- Stable release: 2.2.1 / 2 November 2024; 13 months ago
- Repository: sourceforge.net/p/guvcview/git-master/ci/master/tree
- Written in: C
- Platform: Linux
- Size: 960.7 kB (Guvcview 2.0.1)
- Type: Photo capture program
- License: GPL-2.0-or-later
- Website: guvcview.sourceforge.net

Guvcview (GTK+ UVC Viewer) is a webcam application, i.e. software to handle UVC streams, for the Linux desktop, started by Paulo Assis in 2008. The application is written in C and is free and open-source software released under GPL-2.0-or-later.

Guvcview is compatible with all V4L2 camera devices, using the Linux UVC driver and based on luvcview for video rendering. Audio support employs the PortAudio open-source library. The application's user interface is built using GTK+ and is designed to be simple and easy to use.

The application has been noted as using fewer resources than other webcam applications, such as the GNOME standard webcam application, Cheese, and is an alternative to other webcam applications, including Apple Photo Booth and KDE Kamoso.

== Features ==
Guvcview uses a two-window interface in normal use. One window displays the camera image to be recorded and the other displays the settings and controls, as well as menus.

Through the Linux UVC driver, Guvcview offers extension controls, vendor-specific controls included in the UVC specifications, which are dynamically loaded into the driver. At present only webcam-maker Logitech has provided the specifications for their UVC webcam extension controls and as a result Logitech camera extension controls are included.

Starting with version 0.9.9, Guvcview was able to be operated in control window only mode and used to control images on other applications, including Ekiga, Cheese, mplayer and Skype.

Still images can be recorded in .bmp, .jpg, .png, .raw and videos in .avi, .mkv (Matroska Multimedia Container open standard format) and Google's .webm open standard format.

The video capture mode includes some basic special effects. These are: mirror, invert, negative, mono, pieces and particles, which can be combined by selecting more than one.

== Operating systems ==
Guvcview has been available in Debian for many instruction sets, and in the Ubuntu repositories since Ubuntu 13.10 in 2012. Until the 18.10 release, it was the default webcam application included with Lubuntu.

Guvcview is also available in the Debian and Puppy Linux repositories.

== Reception ==
In reviewing Guvcview in February 2011, Jack Wallen wrote in Ghacks, "Recently I have had to do some video tutorials. I tried recording these tutorials with Ubuntu's default Cheese Webcam Booth, but unfortunately the combination of my Logitech Quickcam Pro 9000, Ubuntu 10.10, and Cheese didn't want to record video in any usable FPS. So I had to look elsewhere. My search turned me to GUVCView and I can't tell you how happy I have been with the results. Not only is this tool as easy to use as Cheese, it's far more flexible, and renders much better video... GUVCView, from my perspective, is a much better means of recording video than Cheese. This especially applies if the video you are recording is to be used for something other than, say, Skype chatting."

Jim Lynch, writing on Linux Desktop Reviews in May 2011, was less enthusiastic about the application's inclusion in Lubuntu, "I actually like Cheese so I can’t say I’m real thrilled about it being replaced by guvcview, but it’s sort of six of one or half dozen of the other when it comes to these two programs. I could get by fine with either one though your mileage may vary depending on your needs and preferences."

Hectic Geek reviewed the application in September 2012 and concluded "...I didn’t have any issues with it and successfully recorded videos (you can manually disable audio input) and took pictures, added few funny effects … all is good with guvcview...."

The application is rated as 4.5/5 on SourceForge.

== See also ==
- Comparison of webcam software
- Softcam
