= Softcam (disambiguation) =

A softcam is a software based camera.

Softcam, softCAM, or soft cam may also refer to:

- Software emulation of a conditional-access module (CAM)
- Software used for computer-aided manufacturing (CAM)
- Soft cam, a cam device on a compound bow

== See also ==
- SoftCamp
