= Magic Camera =

Virtual webcam software

- Developer: ShiningMorning Soft
- Initial release: March 20, 2006; 19 years ago
- Stable release: 8.8.5 / 8 May 2015; 10 years ago
- Written in: C++
- Operating system: Microsoft Windows
- Available in: English, Arabic, Chinese, Brazilian/European Portuguese, Danish, Spanish, French, German, Norwegian, Polish, Romanian, Russian
- Type: Webcam software
- License: Proprietary
- Website: www.shiningmorning.com

Magic Camera, sometimes known as Magic Camera Virtual Webcam, is an application for Microsoft Windows to generate virtual webcams on Windows. It can be used to stream files or displays as a webcam, or create visual effects on a physical webcam. Since the first release of Magic Camera on March 20, 2006, its author ShiningMorning Soft has maintained and kept the product as shareware.

Many instant messengers can only read webcams in video chats. Magic Camera removes this limitation by using another source as your webcam. It supports webcams, digital cameras, TV/video capture cards, DVs, camcorders, and IP cameras. It can add visual effects to the video source and then use the output as a webcam.

== Features ==
The Magic Camera website lists many features of the webcam, including:

- Webcam Effects, such as Photo frames, Visual filters, video transforming effects, or overlaying Flash animations.
- Picture-in-picture.
- Face tracking.
- Changing the video's background.
- Painting or typing on the video.
- Using files/screens as virtual webcams.
- Webcam recording.
- Simulating multiple webcams at once to use different effects in different software.
- Built-in virtual sound card.

== History ==
- Magic Camera 7.2.1 [5-23-2011]
- Magic Camera 7.1.0 [10-28-2010]
- Magic Camera 6.8.0 [05-24-2010]
- Magic Camera Version 6.0.0 [06-20-2009]
- Magic Camera Version 5.8.0 [04-15-2009]
- Magic Camera Version 4.8.0 [02-01-2009]
- Magic Camera Version 3.0.0 [04-06-2008]
- Magic Camera Version 2.0.6 [10-04-2007]
- Magic Camera Version 2.0 [08-18-2007]
- Magic Camera Version 1.0 [03-20-2006]

From May 2009, Magic Camera supports 64bit Windows 7 with its Kernel mode webcam device driver.

In 2009, Magazine Chip wrote an article about Magic Camera webcam effects.

In December 2010, news.NewHua.com, one of the largest online IT websites in China, wrote reviews on Magic Camera to recommend it to China QQ users.

In 2011, data from CNet reported that Magic Camera has about 20k+ downloads/week and 1.4 million downloads in total. It was listed as part of the top 10 most popular software on CNet communication category many times.

== See also ==
- Comparison of webcam software
- Softcam
- QQ
