= List of free television software =

This is a list of free television software, and includes television-related software which is distributed as free software – under a free software licence, with the source code available.

== Notable free television software ==
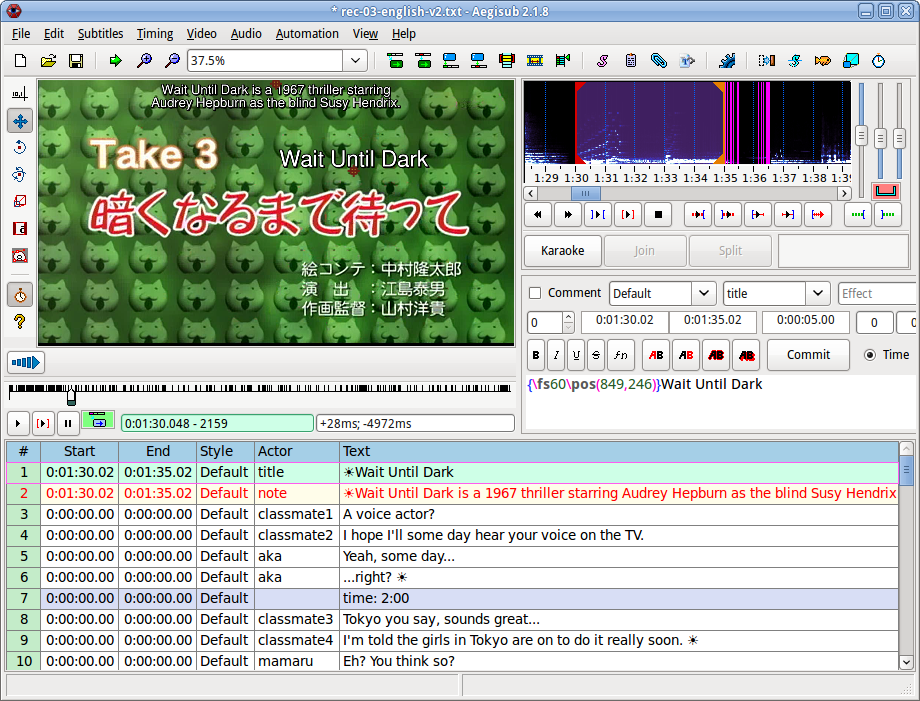
A screenshot from Aegisub

- Aegisub - subtitle editing software
- GeeXboX - GeeXboX (stylized as GEExBox) is a free Linux distribution providing a media center software suite for personal computers.
- Kdetv - Discontinued TV viewer
- Kodi (formerly XBMC) - It allows users to play and view most streaming media, such as videos, music, podcasts, and videos from the Internet, as well as all common digital media files from local and network storage media, or TV gateway viewer.
- Jellyfin - a free and open-source media server and suite of multimedia applications designed to organize, manage, and share digital media files to networked devices
- LinHES
- LinuxMCE
- LinuxTV
- MediaPortal
- Mythbuntu
- MythTV
- Plasma Bigscreen - KDE OS for televisions
- SubRip
- Video disk recorder
- Xawtv
- ZoneMinder

== See also ==
- Comparison of PVR software packages
- List of free and open-source software packages
- List of online video platforms
- List of smart TV platforms
