= NUV =

NUV may refer to:

- Young Liberals of Norway (Norwegian: Norges Unge Venstre (NUV))
- Near visible ultraviolet (NUV) light with wavelength from 300 nm – 400 nm
- Navrachana university vadodara
- MythTV internal file format '.nuv
