= MRLS =

MRLS may refer to:

- Mare reproductive loss syndrome, an ailment in horse
- Mountain Regional Library System, a public library system in Georgia, U.S.

== See also ==
- MRL (disambiguation)
- MLRS, multiple launch rocket system
