= Mythbuntu =

Discontinued media center OS

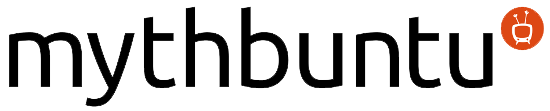

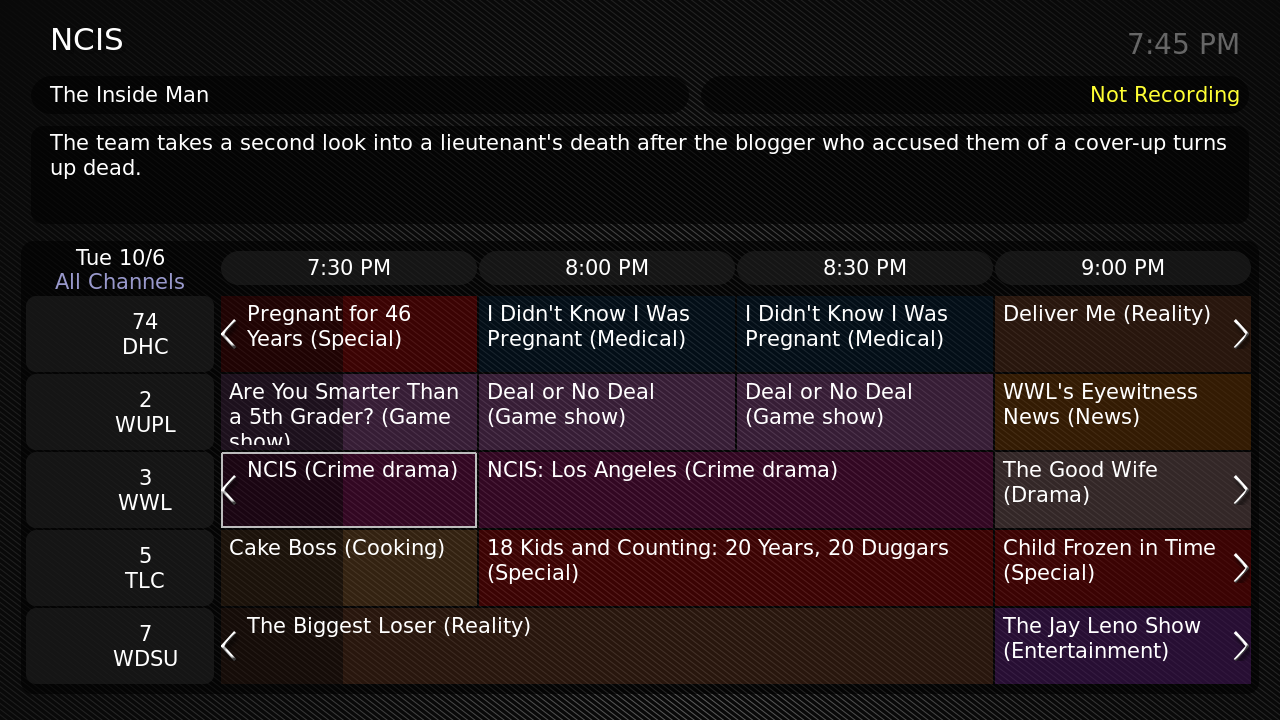
- Mythbuntu showing a program guide/recording scheduler
- OS family: Linux (Unix-like)
- Working state: Discontinued
- Source model: Open source
- Final release: Mythbuntu 16.04 / April 21, 2016; 8 years ago
- Package manager: dpkg
- Kernel type: Monolithic (Linux)
- Default user interface: Xfce, MythTV
- Official website: web.archive.org/web/20181130222553/http://www.mythbuntu.org/

Mythbuntu is a discontinued media center operating system based on Ubuntu, which integrated the MythTV media center software as its main function, and did not install with all of the programs included with Ubuntu.

Following the principles of fellow Linux distributions LinHES and MythDora, Mythbuntu was designed to simplify the installation of MythTV on a home theater PC. After Mythbuntu had been installed the MythTV setup program begins in which it can be configured as a frontend (a media viewer), backend (a media server), or combination of the two.

Mythbuntu aimed to keep close ties with Ubuntu thus allowing changes to be moved upstream for the greater benefit of the Ubuntu Community. Due to the close link with Ubuntu, easy conversions between desktop and standalone Mythbuntu installations are possible. The development cycle of Mythbuntu originally followed that of Ubuntu, with releases occurring every six months. Starting with 12.04, Mythbuntu releases tracked Ubuntu's LTS (long-term support) releases, which release approximately every two years.

On 4 November 2016 the development team announced the end of Mythbuntu as a separate distribution, citing insufficient developers. The team will continue to maintain the Mythbuntu software repository; the announcement advised new users to install another Ubuntu distribution, then install MythTV from the repository.

== Desktop ==
Mythbuntu uses the Xfce desktop interface by default, but users can install ubuntu-desktop, kubuntu-desktop, or xubuntu-desktop through the Mythbuntu Control Centre, allowing users to get the default interfaces from those flavors of Ubuntu. The only software that is included in this release is media-related software such as VLC, Amunix, and Rhythmbox.

== Mythbuntu Control Centre ==
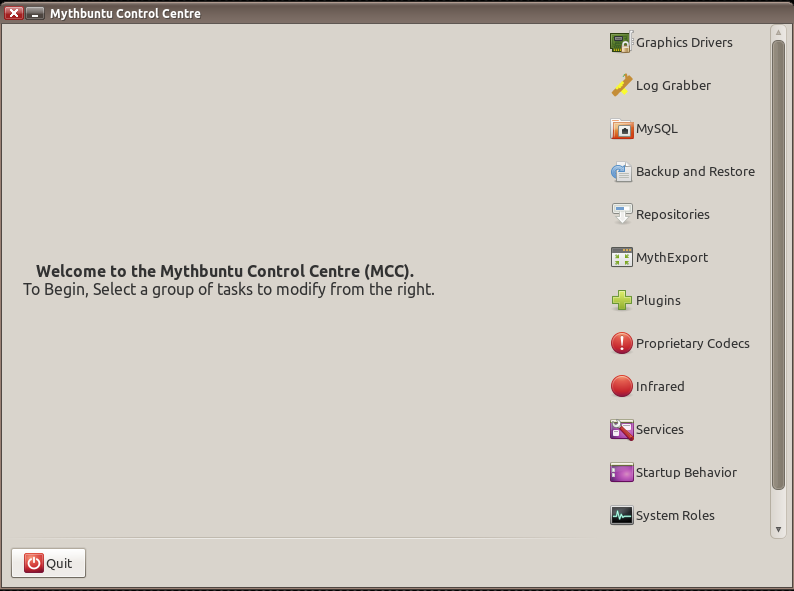
The Mythbuntu Control Centre

The Mythbuntu Control Centre provides a GUI which can be used to configure the system. The user can select what kind of system (Backend, Frontend, Both) they wish to have installed. Inside the Control Centre, the user can perform common actions such as installing plugins for MythTV, configuring the MySQL database, setting passwords, and installing drivers and codecs. MythTV updates can be enabled here as well as switching to the latest release version or development branch of MythTV. Configuration of remote controls and a range of other utilities and small programs are performed all from within this program.

== Different applications of Mythbuntu ==
=== Complete installation (front-end and back-end) ===
Mythbuntu can be used to install a full MythTV system on a single device (acting as both a client and a server). The front-end is the software required for the visual elements (or the GUI) and is utilised by the common user to find, play, and manipulate media files. The back end is the server where the media files, tuners, and database are actually stored. A combined front-and-back-end system may have an advantage in that it has portability: it is a standalone device that is not dependent on a separate server, such as a gaming console.

=== Front-end-only installations ===
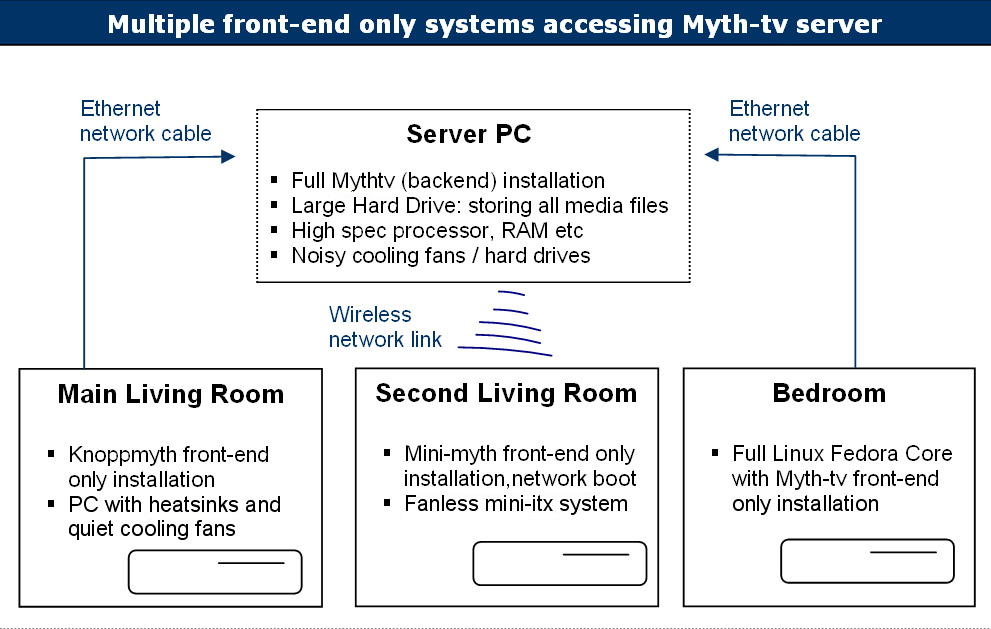
Diagram of a possible setup

Alternatively, Mythbuntu can be used to install a MythTV client: a front-end-only system. This might be useful where users already have a central storage server in their home. The central storage device can act as a MythTV server, and the MythTV front-end client software can be installed on devices with low-power hardware. Mythbuntu can also run directly from a CD-ROM (without installation), provided that there is a network connection to a PC with a MythTV back-end server.

Using a server separate from one or more front-end units offers the ability to use multiple clients with simultaneous access to a single repository of shared media files. The server used would generally have hardware of a relatively high specification and can be kept outside of the main living room or other entertainment area of the home. Another advantage is the ability to move some of the potentially noisy hardware out of the living room, as low-noise, high-performance hardware can be expensive.

== Adding Mythbuntu to Ubuntu ==
Mythbuntu is an Ubuntu derivative that offers an easy single-click conversion from Ubuntu to Mythbuntu. This means a user no longer needs to type in command line, which can be daunting to new users, or hunt for packages in the various package managers.

== Version history ==
Version	Code Name	Release date	MythTV version	Notes
7.10	Gutsy Gibbon	22 October 2007	.20	
8.04	Hardy Heron	24 April 2008	.21	
8.10	Intrepid Ibex	30 October 2008	.21	
9.04	Jaunty Jackalope	23 April 2009	.21-fixes	
9.10	Karmic Koala	29 October 2009	.22	
10.04	Lucid Lynx	29 April 2010	.23	
10.10	Maverick Meerkat	19 October 2010	.23.1	
11.04	Natty Narwhal	28 April 2011	.24	
11.10	Oneiric Ocelot	13 October 2011	.24	
12.04	Precise Pangolin	26 April 2012	.25	
14.04	Trusty Tahr	17 April 2014	.27	
16.04	Xenial Xerus	21 April 2016	.28	
18.04	Bionic Beaver	20 April 2018	.29	

== See also ==
- LinuxMCE
- List of free television software
- XBMC
