= Input (computer science) =

Data provided to a program or process

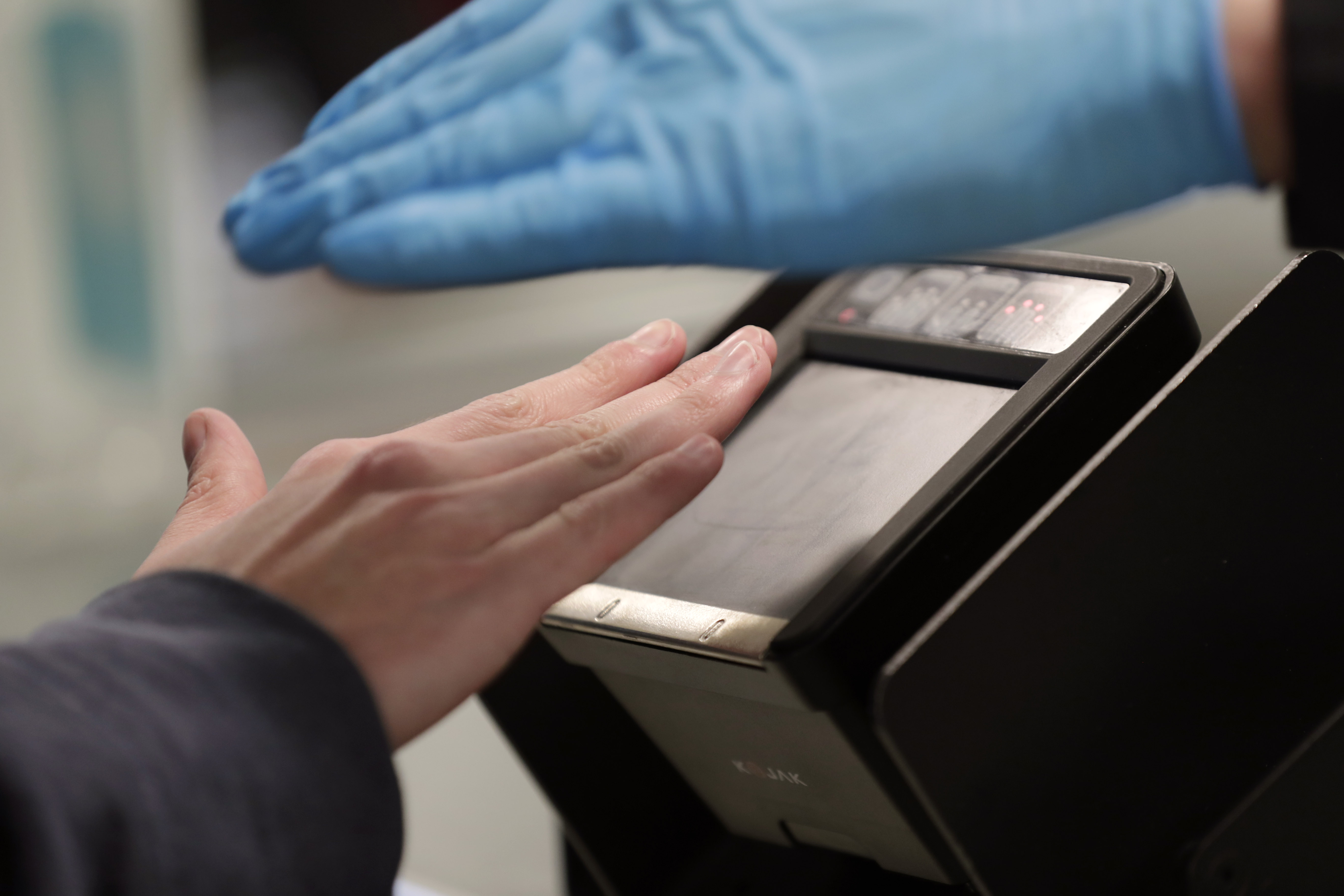
Fingerprint reader

In computer science, the general meaning of input is to provide or give something to the computer, in other words, when a computer or device is receiving a command or signal from outer sources, the event is referred to as input to the device.

Some computer devices can also be categorized as input devices, because devices are used to send instructions to the computer, some common examples of computer input devices are;

- Mouse
- Keyboard
- Touchscreen
- Microphone
- Webcam
- Softcam
- Touchpad
- Trackpad
- Image scanner
- Trackball
- Kinect

Many internal components of computer are input components to other components, like the power-on button of a computer is an input component for the processor or the power supply, because it takes user input and sends it to other components for further processing.

In many computer languages the keyword "input" is used as a special keyword or function, such as in Visual Basic or Python. The command "input" is used to give the machine the data it has to process.

== See also ==
- Input method
- Input device
- Input/output
