= Data entry (disambiguation) =

Data entry may refer to:

- Data entry
- Data acquisition
- Duties of data entry clerk
- use of Keypunch, a device for manually entering data into punched cards
- the name of a department in a company or organization

Data entry may also refer to:

- Input (Computer science)
