= Nuv =

NUV may refer to:

- Near visible ultraviolet (NUV) light with wavelength from 300 nm – 400 nm
- MythTV internal file format .nuv
