= Xawtv =

xawtv
- Developer: Gerd Knorr
- Stable release: 3.107 / May 16, 2020; 5 years ago
- Operating system: Unix-like
- Type: TV recording
- License: GPL
- Website: www.kraxel.org/blog/linux/xawtv/
- Repository: git.linuxtv.org/xawtv3.git

xawtv is software for watching and recording television and webcams with either a TV tuner or a Satellite receiver card (DVB-S). xawtv works on Unix-like operating systems, and is licensed under the GPL.

xawtv does not favour any particular desktop environment. It comes with applications which use Motif-based widgets, as well as other X11 and command line applications. It works with Video4linux and XVideo. The interface to xawtv is minimalistic, so it has been used to add video support to other programs.

== See also ==
- List of free television software
