= MRL =

MRL may refer to:

- KL Monorail Line, a rapid transit monorail line in Malaysia
- Magnetic Reference Laboratory, an American company that makes and sells Calibration Tapes
- Margaret Ruthven Lang (1867–1972), an American composer
- Mineral Resources Limited, Australian mining company
- Official Monster Raving Loony Party, a UK political party
- Montana Rail Link, a US railroad
- Merck Research Laboratories, an American pharmaceutical company

Technology related:

- Manufacturing readiness level, a measure of the maturity of the manufacturing readiness of an object of technology related to Technology Readiness Level (TRL)
- Maximum residue limit, a trading standard, usually for pesticide residues on foodstuffs
- Media resource locator, a URI for multimedia
- Multiple rocket launcher
- Murphy Roths large, a strain of mouse, having remarkable tissue regeneration abilities
- Machine room-less elevators
