= LinHES =

- Developer: Cecil Hugh Watson
- OS family: Linux (Unix-like)
- Working state: Dormant
- Source model: Open source
- Initial release: August 8, 2003; 22 years ago
- Latest release: R8.6.1 / April 12, 2019; 7 years ago
- Marketing target: Home theater PCs, media servers
- Available in: Multilingual (starting with Release 8)
- Package manager: Pacman
- Default user interface: Enlightenment
- Official website: www.linhes.org

LinHES (Linux Home Entertainment Server) is a Linux distribution designed for use on Home Theater PCs (HTPCs). Before version 6, it was called KnoppMyth. The most recent release (R8), for 64-bit machines only, is based on Arch Linux, though previous versions were based on Knoppix and Debian.

LinHES includes custom scripts that install and configure the MythTV PVR software as well as a number of add-ons. Most standard HTPC hardware is supported, and much of it is even configured automatically, making the often complex installation and configuration process relatively easy and pain-free.

Cecil Watson developed and maintains the LinHES operating system.

== Details ==
=== Practical explanation ===
LinHES is a Linux distribution equivalent to the Windows Media Center. LinHES comes as a CD-ROM software distribution which automates the setup of the popular MythTV package as well as several HTPC-related add-ons.

Ultimately, LinHES is used to create a home theater PC. These HTPCs are commonly plugged into a standard-definition television (SDTV) or high-definition television (HDTV) rather than monitors for a complete home theater experience. HTPCs bring the power of PCs to the living room in an "all in one" device.

=== Ease of installation and features ===
A common complaint about MythTV is that it is difficult and time-consuming to install and configure. The goal of LinHES is to make creating and maintaining a home theater PC as simple as possible. A blank system can be transformed to a fully functional HTPC in around 20 minutes capable of:

- watching & recording television
- pausing live TV
- playback of DVDs and most popular video formats
- retrieve fan art and information about your videos
- jukebox supporting multiple audio formats
- view images
- get the latest news & weather
- play games

=== Applications ===
==== Complete Installation (Front-end and Back-end) ====
LinHES can be used to install a full MythTV client and server system. This means that the front-end is stored on the same device as the back-end. The front-end is the software required for the visual elements (or the GUI) that the regular user can utilize to find, play and manipulate media files etc. The back-end is the server where the media files are actually stored. A full front-end and back-end system may have an advantage in that it has 'portability', i.e. it is a standalone device that is not dependent on a separate server (like a video game console for example).

==== Front-end only installations ====
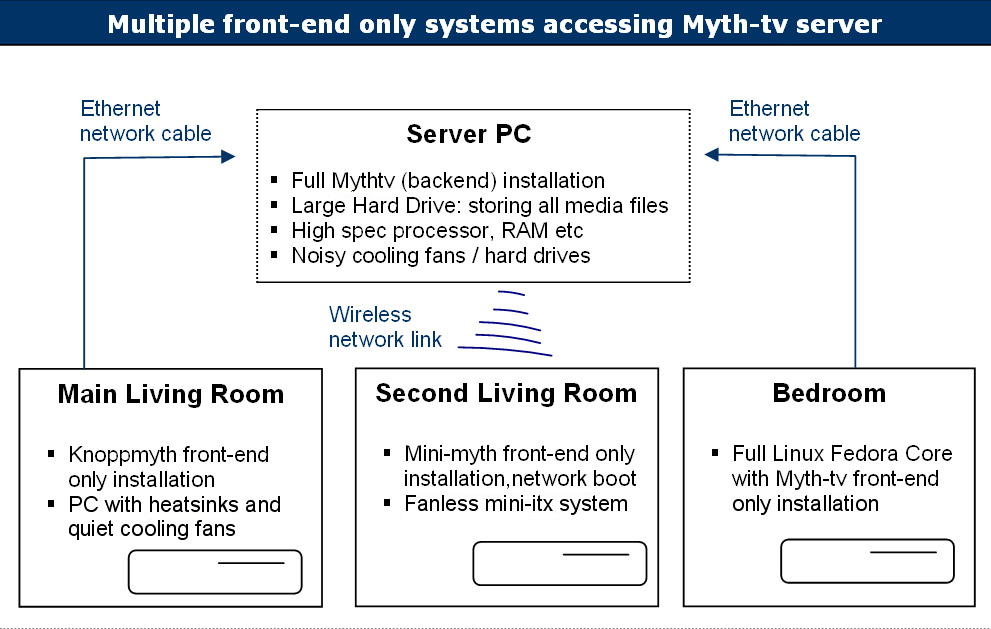

Alternatively, LinHES can be used to install a MythTV client, front-end-only system. For example, users may have a central storage device (server) in their house, the server can then be accessed from numerous other devices throughout the house, these other devices needing only a front-end installation on devices containing minimal hardware. LinHES can also run directly from a CD-ROM (i.e. without installation) providing that there is a network connection to a PC with a 'complete installation' (a MythTV back-end server).

Using a 'server' separate from one or more front-end units has the obvious advantages of multiple simultaneous access to shared media files. The server used would generally have hardware of a relatively high specification and would be kept outside of the main living room. An advantage of keeping the server PC outside the living room is that the cooling fan required to accommodate a 'fast' processor can be quite noisy (as can certain hard drives), it can be expensive to invest in fanless/heat sinking equipment to avoid such noise problems.

LinHES can also be used to upgrade existing LinHES and KnoppMyth installations.

=== LinHES community ===
LinHES users generally discuss ideas and help others at the official forum website.

== Version history ==
LinHES R7.4 was the last 32-bit release.

=== KnoppMyth releases ===
Version	Release Date	Name	Note
1	August 8, 2003	You better Belize it!	Based on Knoppix July 26, 2003 and MythTV 0.10
2	August 25, 2003	Chicago, Chicago	Updated to MythTV 0.11
3	September 1, 2003	Each of these my three babies	The CD can now be use as a frontend!
4	November 3, 2003	CoCo2	Updated to MythTV 0.12
5 B7	March 17, 2006	-	-
5 C7	May 26, 2006	-	-
5 E50	December 25, 2006	Farewell days of my youth	-
5 Final 1	May 11, 2007	-	-
5 F27	September 9, 2007	-	-
5.5	July 6, 2008	Bone Marrow	Uses a snapshot of Debian Unstable and the 2.6.23-chw-4 kernel - MythTV 0.21 fixes

=== LinHES releases ===
Version	Release Date	Name	Note
6.00.09	August 14, 2009	Anniversary Edition	Pre-Release
6.01.00	September 26, 2009	Chugu	First Public Release - MythTV 0.21 fixes
6.02.00	March 2, 2010	That weekend in Canada!	MythTV 0.22 fixes
6.03.00	June 6, 2010	M	MythTV 0.23 fixes
6.04.00	February 6, 2011	Laundrymat	MythTV 0.24 fixes
7.1	November 11, 2011	Teamwork	More MythTV 0.24 fixes
7.2	January 26, 2012	SCALE 10X	Even more MythTV 0.24 fixes
7.3	July 20, 2012	Crave	MythTV 0.25 fixes
7.4	August 9, 2012	rdt	Ninth Anniversary - more MythTV 0.25 fixes
8	February 11, 2013	-	Many Bug Fixes and New Features

== See also ==
- Arch Linux
- List of free television software
- Mythbuntu
- MythTV
