= Camfecting =

Form of hacking

In computer security, camfecting is the process of attempting to hack into a person's webcam and activate it without the webcam owner's permission. The remotely activated webcam can be used to watch anything within the webcam's field of vision, sometimes including the webcam owner themselves. Camfecting is most often carried out by infecting the victim's computer with a virus that can provide the hacker access to their webcam. This attack is specifically targeted at the victim's webcam, and hence the name camfecting, a portmanteau of the words camera and infecting.

Typically, a webcam hacker or a camfecter sends his victim an innocent-looking application which has a hidden Trojan software through which the camfecter can control the victim's webcam. The camfecter virus installs itself silently when the victim runs the original application. Once installed, the camfecter can turn on the webcam and capture pictures/videos. The camfecter software works just like the original webcam software present in the victim computer, the only difference being that the camfecter controls the software instead of the webcam's owner.

== Notable cases ==
Marcus Thomas, former assistant director of the FBI's Operational Technology Division in Quantico, said in a 2013 story in The Washington Post that the FBI had been able to covertly activate a computer's camera—without triggering the light that lets users know it is recording—for several years.

In November 2013, American teenager Jared James Abrahams pleaded guilty to hacking over 100-150 women and installing the highly invasive malware Blackshades on their computers in order to obtain nude images and videos of them. One of his victims was Miss Teen USA 2013 Cassidy Wolf.

Researchers from Johns Hopkins University have shown how to covertly capture images from the iSight camera on MacBook and iMac models released before 2008, by reprogramming the microcontroller's firmware.

== Prevention ==
A computer that does not have an up-to-date webcam software or any anti-virus (or firewall) software installed and operational may be at increased risk for camfecting from different types of malware. Softcams may nominally increase this risk, if not maintained or configured properly. Although a person cannot protect themselves from zero-day exploits that could potentially activate a camera unknowingly, such as Pegasus is able to do on smartphones.

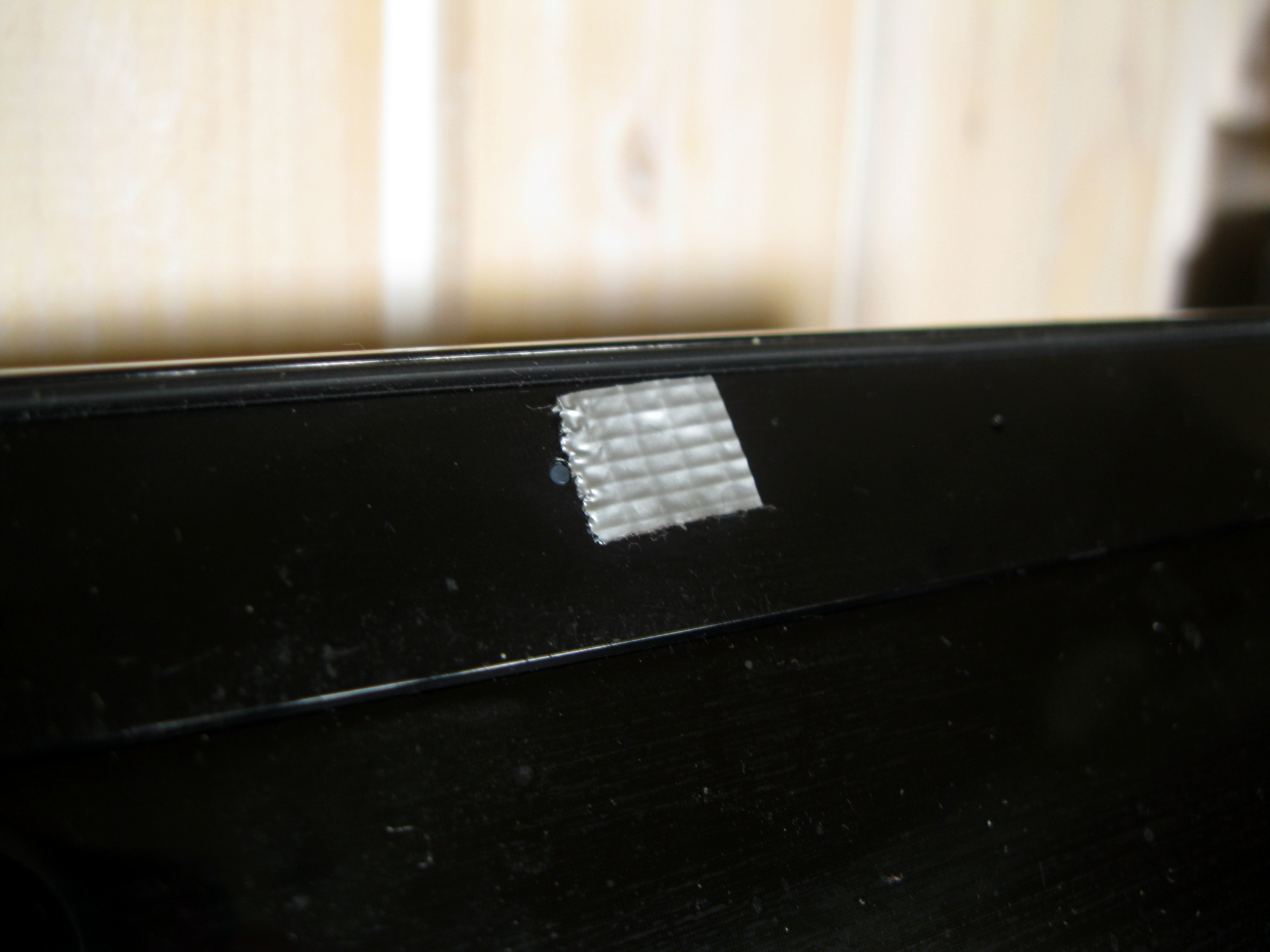
A small piece of duct tape over a webcam lens

The only way to truly avoid being watched through your own camera is by blocking it physically, since software blocks can be overriden by advanced persistent threats. A simple piece of tape is more commonly used to offuscate the feed of the camera. With even Mark Zuckerberg doing so on his personal laptop that appeared during a presentation, and it being the way Snowden, an ex-contractor for the NSA, is portrayed to do so to prevent camfecting in the biopic Snowden.

There is now a market for the manufacture and sale of sliding lens covers that allow users to physically block their computer's camera and, in some cases, microphone. A number of phone and laptop manufacturers tried to implement pop-up cameras that can only be opened manually by the user. But the trend did not become mainstream because of the engineering it took to keep the mechanisms up to date, as well as the fragility and durability of the cameras.

== See also ==
- Espionage
- Pegasus (spyware)
- Internet privacy
- Optic Nerve (GCHQ)
- Secret photography
- Surveillance
- Trojan
- Webcam
