= Tvheadend =

Television streaming server and recorder software

- Developer(s): Tvheadend
- Stable release: 4.2.8 / 12 January 2019; 6 years ago
- Preview release: v4.3 / 22 May 2017; 8 years ago
- Repository: github.com/tvheadend/tvheadend
- Type: TV streaming server
- License: GPLv3 and various permissive
- Website: tvheadend.org

TVHeadend, sometimes TVH for short, is a server application that reads video streams from LinuxTV sources and publishes them as internet streams. It supports multiple inputs, a DVB-T USB tuner stick and a Sat>IP tuner for instance, combining them together into a single channel listing. TVH servers are themselves IP signal providers, allowing networks of TVH servers to be combined.

TVH is typically used to send video to receiver devices like smart televisions and set top boxes throughout a household network, but is also used to forward signals over long distance links, even between countries. It also includes electronic program guide information (if available) and the ability to record programs like a DVR, including the ability to transcode from MPEG2 to h264 and h265.
