= Video Disk Recorder =

Open-source application for Linux

- Developer: Klaus-Peter Schmidinger
- Initial release: 7 April 2002; 23 years ago
- Stable release: 2.6.1 / 2 February 2022; 3 years ago
- Repository: ftp.tvdr.de/vdr/
- Written in: C, C++
- Operating system: Linux
- Type: Personal video recorder
- License: GPL
- Website: tvdr.de

Video Disk Recorder (VDR) is an open-source application for Linux designed to allow any computer to function as a digital video recorder, in order to record and replay TV programming using the computer's hard drive. The computer needs to be equipped with a digital TV tuner card. VDR can also operate as an mp3 player and DVD player using available plugins. VDR uses drivers from the LinuxTV project. VDR was originally written by Klaus-Peter Schmidinger, one of the founders of CadSoft Computer GmbH and original developer of the EAGLE electronic design application. The software was originally hosted on CadSoft's server.

== See also ==
- Comparison of PVR software packages
