= Softcam =

Software-based camera

A softcam is essentially a software-based camera.

Softcams are computer software (that technically do not replace webcams) that allows one to stream or broadcast image, video, and/or audio files through a virtual webcam device. This allows the video stream to be used in place of a normal webcam stream in video conferencing applications like MSN Messenger, NetMeeting, Skype etc. or any other programs that use webcam devices.

Some softcam software such as Magic Camera and ManyCam allows the user to apply graphics and effects to the video as well, making the software more analogous to a video switcher. In effect, softcam software allows the user to project media files as though it were live over a webcam. Video from normal webcams can also be passed through softcam software to allow the same graphics and effects to be overlaid onto normal webcam video.

== History ==
The historical origins of soft cam type software is unclear, but image sensor emulation may have been used by the US and USSR space programs as part of camera integration on spacecraft. In the modern era, physical teleconferencing systems (as opposed to ones dependent on a personal computer) may have been tested with soft cam technology in the late 1980s.

As soft cam software evolved in parallel with digital camera software, one can consider soft cam history and webcam history to be the same.

== Risks ==
Having multiple webcam emulators installed on a personal computer may increase the risk of camfecting. In the field of computer security, camfecting is the process of attempting to hack into a person's webcam and activate it without the owner's permission.

Remotely activated webcams can be used to watch anything within the webcam's field of vision, sometimes including the webcam owner themselves. Camfecting is most often carried out by infecting the victim's computer with a virus that can provide the hacker access to the webcam. This attack is specifically targeted at the victim's webcam, and hence the name camfecting, a portmanteau of the words camera and infecting.

Typically, a webcam hacker or a camfecter sends his victim an innocent-looking application which has a Trojan horse software through which the camfecter can control the victim's webcam. The camfecter virus installs itself silently when the victim runs the original application. Once installed, the camfecter can turn on the webcam and capture pictures/videos. The camfecter software works just like the original webcam software present in the computer, the only difference being that the camfecter controls the software instead of the webcam owner.

== In popular culture ==
Webcam emulators have been featured in several sitcoms

- Austin & Ally "Albums & Auditions", a webcam emulator is used to fake a performing arts audition, with many glitches – but is successful.

== See also ==
- Comparison of webcam software
