= Media resource locator =

URI for multimedia

A media resource locator (MRL) is a URI used to uniquely identify and locate a multimedia resource. It is used by the VideoLAN and Xine media players, as well as the Java Media Framework (JMF) API.

VLC, for example, supports the following MRLs:

- dvd://[⟨device⟩][@⟨raw device⟩][@[⟨title⟩][,[⟨chapter⟩][,⟨angle⟩]]]
- vcd://[⟨device⟩][@{E]
- http://⟨server address⟩[:⟨server port⟩]/[⟨file⟩]
- rtsp://⟨server address⟩[:⟨server port⟩]/⟨stream name⟩

Several media players also support Video4Linux as v4l:// and v4l2://.
