= SoftCamp =

South Korean information security company

SoftCamp Co., Ltd.
- Industry: IT security
- Founded: July 1999 in Seoul
- Headquarters: 17, Pangyo-ro 228beon-gil, Bundang-gu, Seongnam-si, Gyeonggi-do, South Korea
- Key people: CEO: Bae Hwan-kuk
- Products: Document security, document centralization, CDR Solution, anti-keylogger
- Number of employees: 121 (2019)

SoftCamp Co., Ltd. (Korean: 소프트캠프) is a South Korean information security company founded in 1999. The company is specialized in Enterprise Digital Rights Management and Content Disarm & Reconstructions

== History ==
SoftCamp was founded in July, 1999,

South Korean financial representative groups, including KB Financial Group, Shinhan Financial Group, and Hana Financial Group, and conglomerates, including KT Group, Hyundai-KIA Motor Company and Shinsegae Group were using SoftCamp's document security and domain security products by 2014.

The company was listed on the KOSDAQ market in December 2019.
