= MythTV =

Open source digital video recorder and media center application

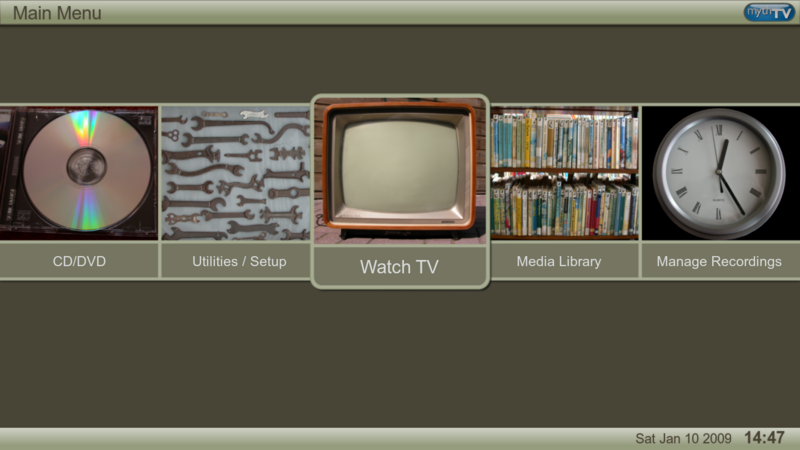
- A screenshot of MythTV's main menu in the default theme, Terra
- Developer: Isaac Richards
- Initial release: April 10, 2002; 23 years ago
- Stable release: V36 / 10 February 2026; 0 days ago
- Written in: C, C++
- Operating system: Linux, FreeBSD, macOS, Windows (playback only)
- Type: Digital video recorder and media center application
- License: GNU GPL
- Website: www.mythtv.org
- Repository: github.com/MythTV/mythtv

MythTV is a free and open-source digital video recorder and media center application with a simplified "10-foot user interface" design for the living room TV. It turns a computer with the necessary hardware into a network streaming digital video recorder, a digital multimedia home entertainment system, or a home theater PC. It can be considered a free and open-source alternative to TiVo or Windows Media Center. It runs on various operating systems, primarily Linux, macOS, and FreeBSD.

== History ==
The MythTV project was started in April 2002 by Isaac Richards, who explained his motivation:

I got tired of the rather low quality cable box that AT&T Broadband provides with their digital cable service. It's slow to change channels, ridden with ads, and the program guide is a joke. So, I figured it'd be fun to try and build a replacement. Yes, I could have just bought a TiVo, but I wanted to have more than just a DVR – I want a web browser built in, a mail client, maybe some games. Basically, I want the mythical convergence box that's been talked about for a few years now.

== Features ==
- Pause, skip, and rewind live TV shows
- Completely automatic commercial detection and optional skipping
- Intelligently schedules recordings to avoid conflicts
- Interfaces with television listing sources such as XMLTV or PSIP
- Interfaces with nonprofit subscription listings service Schedules Direct in the United States and Canada. Schedules Direct delivers the same Tribune Media Services listings data that TiVo and other video recorders use.
- Supports ATSC, QAM, DMB-T/H and DVB (everything supported by LinuxTV) high-definition television
- Supports Xv, OpenGL, and VDPAU video output
- Supports H.264 codec
- Supports VP9 and H.265 codecs as of version 0.28
- A backend server and frontend client architecture, allowing multiple frontend client machines to be remotely served content from one or more backend servers. A single computer can perform as both the frontend client and the backend server.
- Plays recordings at an accelerated or decelerated rate, adjusting the audio pitch as necessary
- Schedule and administer various system functions using a web browser-based interface
- Controls a set-top box using an infrared remote (IR blaster), or FireWire

=== HDTV support ===
MythTV is capable of capturing HDTV streams from any source that will provide unencrypted video. This means broadcast ATSC and DVB content, as well as encrypted DVB content when using a tuner with an integrated CI module. Most U.S. cable and satellite providers use encrypted video only accessible through their own set-top boxes. Cable systems may provide some unencrypted QAM channels, but these will generally only be local broadcast stations, and not cable programming or premium channels.

OpenCable devices are available to access encrypted content on U.S. cable systems, but as this is a full DRM system, and not just CA like DVB CI, every piece of hardware and software on the playback chain must be tested and licensed by CableLabs. At current, Windows Media Center is the only DVR software to meet these requirements, and only it, and other software using its recording libraries, can use these devices. In 2010, CableLabs relaxed the DRM restrictions allowing unlicensed devices to record copy freely content using these devices, however it is still entirely up to cable operators what content they provide flagged as such.

As an alternative to direct digital capture, one can use an external decoder to receive the channels, and then capture using digital-analog-digital conversion (the analog hole). A popular means of doing this conversion is to connect the component outputs of a set-top box to the Hauppauge HD PVR.

=== Modules ===
MythTV's add-on modules (plugins) include:

- MythVideo plays various video file formats
- MythMusic a music player, jukebox, collection manager, and CD ripper
- MythGallery online photo gallery manager
- MythNews RSS feed news reader
- MythWeather fetches weather forecasts – including weather radar – from the Internet
- MythBrowser small web browser
- MythGame frontend for game console emulators
- MythWeb controls MythTV from a remote web browser
- MythArchive DVD burner
- MythNetvision streaming video player intended primarily for Flash-websites like YouTube
- MythZoneMinder frontend interface for a ZoneMinder system
- UPnP AV MediaServer v1.0 compliant server: share media files with UPnP-clients

The base system integrates with its modules. A system can be controlled with an infrared remote control using LIRC, or radio remote control using kernel modules.

== Operating systems ==
MythTV is available for many operating systems based on Linux or Unix, including Mac OS. The MythTV website distributes only source code, which must be compiled for the desired system; executable programs can be downloaded from various third-party sources. The software runs on and is officially supported by Microsoft Windows, but as of January 2013 no official executable version was available; there are detailed instructions for compiling for Windows. All core frontend features work under Windows, including LiveTV, scheduling, and watching recordings, but most plugins do not work without additional patches.

=== Bundles ===
Notable projects that include a Linux distribution bundled with MythTV (and associated libraries) are:

- FreeBSD has several ports to support MythTV
- LinHES is a bootCD derivative of Arch Linux. Its MythTV frontend can be run from the CD. An entire installation to the hard disk can be made in minutes.
- LinuxMCE bundles MythTV with Kubuntu as the Linux distro, along with the Pluto Home automation suite.
- Mythbuntu combines Ubuntu distributions with MythTV. The Ubuntu community has built extensive resources for installing, configuring and troubleshooting MythTV. It was discontinued in 2016.
- Ubuntu TV integrates MythTV into a television-ready interface (based on the Ubuntu Unity user interface).
- Xebian is a distribution of Debian Linux for the Microsoft Xbox game console and includes MythTV.

== See also ==
- Comparison of DVR software packages
- Home theater PC
- Infrared blaster
- List of free television software
- Schedules Direct
- Ubuntu TV
