= Comparison of webcam software =

Webcam software allows users to take pictures and video and save them to their computer.

	Operating system	License
Bandicam	Windows	Proprietary
Camera	Linux	GPL-3.0-or-later
Cheese	Linux	GPL-2.0-or-later
CodyCam	Haiku	MIT
Guvcview	Linux	GPL-2.0-or-later
Magic Camera	Windows	Proprietary
OBS Studio	Linux, Windows, macOS	GPL-2.0-or-later
Photo Booth	macOS	Proprietary

== See also ==
- Comparison of screencasting software
