= ZoneMinder =

Closed-circuit television software

- Release: September 25, 2002; 23 years ago
- Stable release: 1.37.61 / 8 June 2024; 2 years ago
- Written in: C++, Perl and PHP
- Operating system: Linux, FreeBSD
- Available in: Multilingual
- Type: Surveillance
- License: GPL
- Website: zoneminder.com
- Repository: github.com/ZoneMinder/zoneminder

ZoneMinder is a free, open-source software application for monitoring via closed-circuit television - developed to run under Linux and FreeBSD and released under the terms of the GNU General Public License (GPL).

Users control ZoneMinder via a web-based interface. The application can use standard cameras (via a capture card, USB, FireWire etc.) or IP-based camera devices. The software allows three modes of operation:

- monitoring (without recording)
- recording after detected movement
- permanent recording

The application supports multiple cameras, reviewable simultaneously. Recording starts when the application detects changes between camera frames; one can select zones within field of view that the software will ignore. ZoneMinder supports cameras compatible with ONVIF standard. However, relative difficulty of configuration is - along with limited support for other languages than English - counted among ZoneMinder's weak points. This is underlined by lack of straightforward documentation. Filip Palian reported in 2008 that ZoneMinder contained security loopholes allowing unauthorized remote control of cameras, basic authentication (for example, .htaccess on Apache) should circumvent such issues.

== See also ==
- Surveillance
- Closed-circuit television (CCTV)
- Closed-circuit television camera
- List of free television software
