= Photo Booth =

Apple software

- Photo Booth running on macOS Big Sur
- Stable release: 13.0 / October 24, 2022; 3 years ago
- Operating system: macOS, and iPadOS
- Type: Photo filter program

Photo Booth is an application developed by Apple for the macOS and iPadOS operating systems that allows users to take photos and videos using the device's built-in camera.

Photo Booth was released in October 2005 and was originally available only on Macintosh computers that had a built-in iSight camera running Mac OS X Tiger.

Photo Booth displays a preview showing the camera's view in real time. Thumbnails of saved photos and videos are displayed along the bottom of this window, obscuring the bottom of the video preview. These can be shown or played by clicking on the thumbnails.

By default, Photo Booth's live preview and captured images are reversed horizontally, to simulate the user looking into a mirror; an option provides unreversed images.

== History ==
Photo Booth was first introduced by Apple in 2005 with the release of iMac G5, which featured a built-in iSight camera. The app was later introduced on iPad devices with the release of iPad 2 in March 2011.

Since its initial release, Photo Booth has received several updates and new features. Notable updates include:

- Additional Effects: In 2011, Apple added new filters and effects to the app, such as Space Alien, Blockhead, Dizzy, and Lovestruck, among others.
- Sharing Features: In 2012, Apple added new sharing features to Photo Booth, allowing users to share photos and videos to social media sites such as Facebook, Twitter, and Flickr.

== Post-processing ==
After the picture is taken effects can be applied by clicking on the "Effects" button. Photo Booth has two sets of image effects that can be applied when taking a picture. The first set contains photographic filters similar to those in Adobe Photoshop; additional effects may be downloaded from websites. Another set allows replacing the background with a custom backdrop.

=== Backgrounds ===
From Mac OS X 10.5 Leopard to macOS 10.14 Mojave, the user could apply backdrops to provide an effect similar to a green screen. When a backdrop was selected, a message appeared telling the user to step away from the camera. Once the background was analyzed, the user stepped back in front of the camera and was shown in front of the chosen backdrop.

== See also ==
- Comparison of webcam software
