= LinuxTV =

Software development project

The LinuxTV project is an informal group of volunteers who develop software regarding digital television for the Linux kernel-based operating systems. The community develops and maintains the Digital Video Broadcasting (DVB) driver subsystem which is part of the Linux kernel since version 2.6.x. The Linux kernel and the LinuxTV CVS include a fair number of drivers for commonly available PCI cards and USB devices, but the DVB subsystem core is also targeted towards set-top boxes which run some (embedded) Linux.

The LinuxTV project was originally initiated by the Berlin, Germany based company Convergence Integrated Media GmbH with the goal to distribute free and open source software for the production, distribution and reception of digital television. In 1998, the Convergence founders claimed that "Only the access to the source code of our future television sets will guarantee the independence of content and technology".

After some financial troubles, in 2002 Convergence had been taken over by the German set top box manufacturer Galaxis AG, and renamed to Convergence GmbH. Although both Convergence GmbH and Galaxis AG went bankrupt in 2005, the LinuxTV project lives on independently, being supported by the large developer community that had gathered around the project over the years.

Another significant Convergence development is DirectFB, a thin library that provides hardware graphics acceleration and windowing features for GTK+-based and other graphical Linux applications without the use of X.Org Server, and which its developers claim "adds graphical power to embedded systems".

== See also ==
- Tvheadend
- Video4Linux
- List of free television software
- Digital television
