= Webcam =

Video camera connected to a computer or network

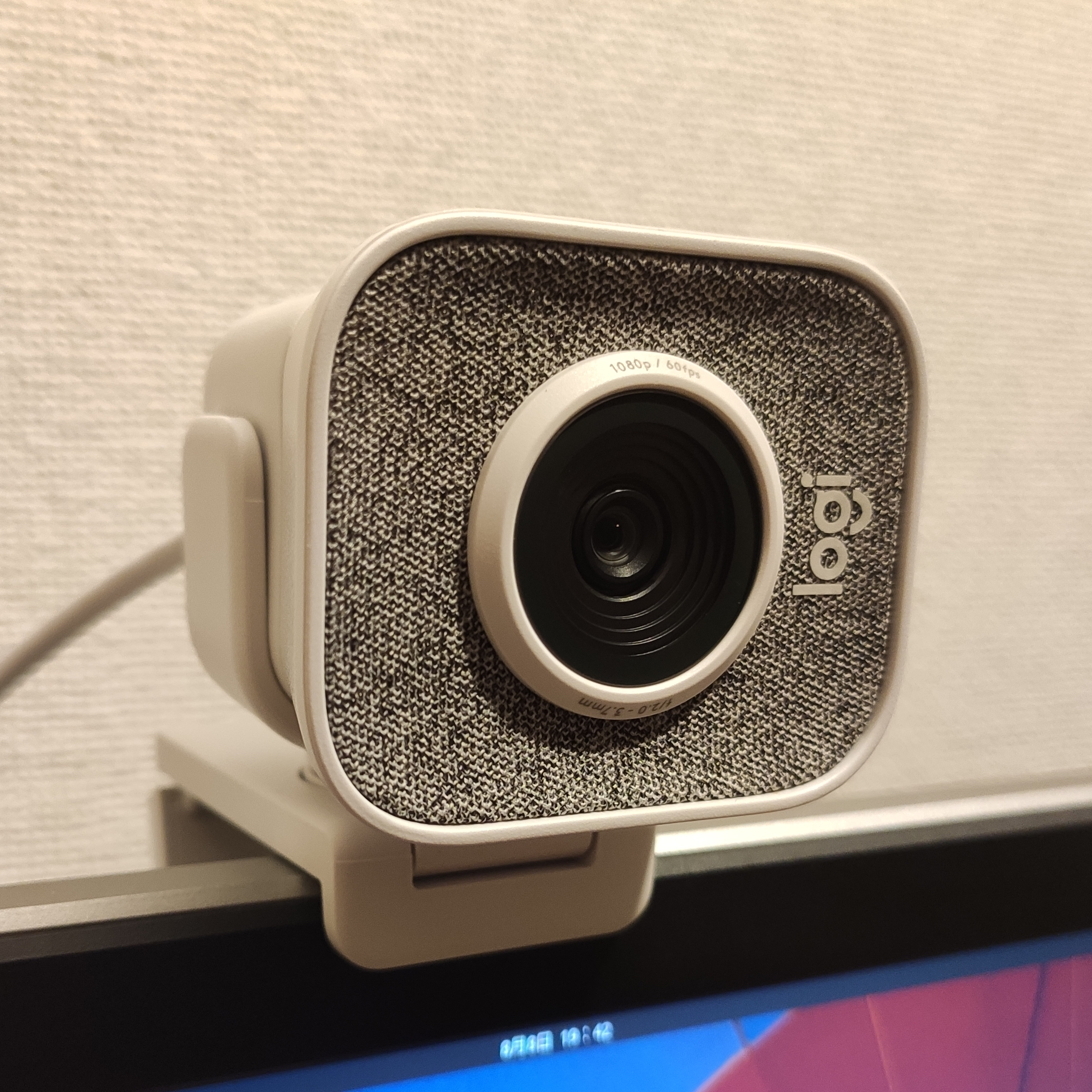
A Logitech-branded webcam attached to a laptop

A webcam is a video camera which is designed to record or stream to a computer or computer network. They are primarily used in video telephony, live streaming and social media, and security. Webcams can be built-in computer hardware, like a laptop, or peripheral devices, and are commonly connected to a device using USB or wireless protocol.

Webcams have been used on the Internet as early as 1993, and the first widespread commercial one became available in 1994. Early webcam usage on the Internet was primarily limited to stationary shots streamed to web sites. In the late 1990s and early 2000s, instant messaging clients added support for webcams, increasing their popularity in video conferencing. Computer manufacturers later started integrating webcams into laptop hardware. In 2020, the COVID-19 pandemic caused a shortage of webcams due to the increased number of people working from home and children attending school remotely.

== History ==
=== Early development (early 1990s) ===
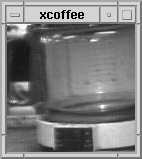
The Trojan Room coffee pot, as displayed in XCoffee

First developed in 1991, a webcam was pointed at the Trojan Room coffee pot in the Cambridge University Computer Science Department (initially operating over a local network instead of the web). The camera was finally switched off on August 22, 2001. The final image captured by the camera can still be viewed at its homepage. The oldest continuously operating webcam, San Francisco State University's FogCam, has run since 1994 and is still operating as of September 2026. It updates every 20 seconds.

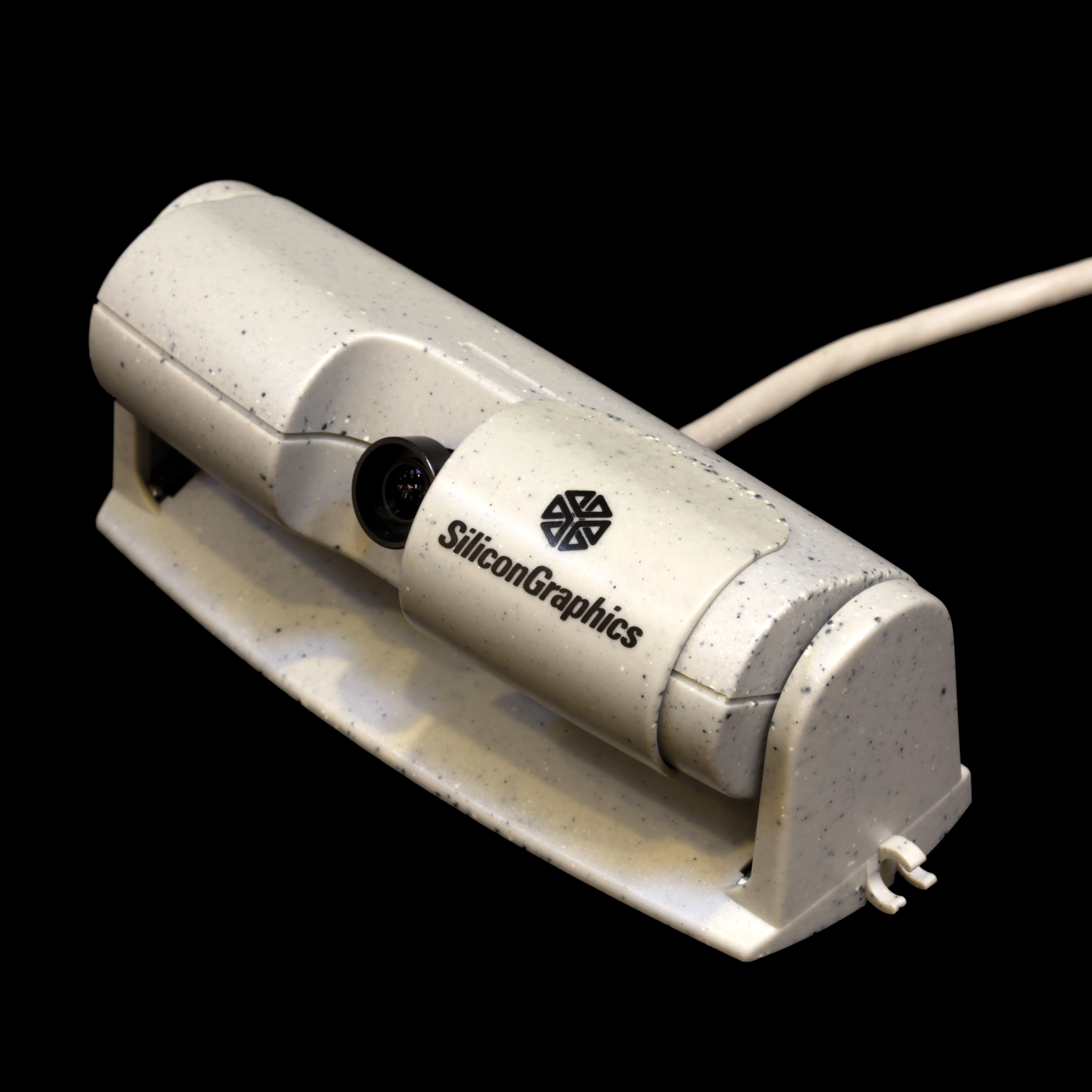
SGI IndyCam

The SGI Indy, released in 1993, is the first commercial computer to have a standard video camera, and the first SGI computer to have standard video inputs.

The maximum supported input resolution is 640×480 for NTSC or 768×576 for PAL. A fast machine is required to capture at either of these resolutions, though; an Indy with slower R4600PC CPU, for example, may require the input resolution to be reduced before storage or processing. However, the Vino hardware is capable of DMAing video fields directly into the frame buffer with minimal CPU overhead.

The first widespread commercial webcam, the black-and-white QuickCam, entered the marketplace in 1994, created by the U.S. computer company Connectix. QuickCam was available in August 1994 for the Apple Macintosh, connecting via a serial port, at a cost of $100. Jon Garber, the designer of the device, had wanted to call it the "Mac-camera", but was overruled by Connectix's marketing department; a version with a PC-compatible parallel port and software for Microsoft Windows was launched in October 1995. The original Quick Cam provided 320x240-pixel resolution with a grayscale depth of 16 shades at 60 frames per second, or 256 shades at 15 frames per second. These cams were tested on several Delta II launch using a variety of communication protocols including CDMA, TDMA, GSM and HF.

Videoconferencing via computers already existed, and at the time client-server based videoconferencing software such as CU-SeeMe had started to become popular.

The first widely known laptop with integrated webcam option, at a price point starting at US$ 12,000, was an IBM RS/6000 860 laptop and its related ThinkPad 850, released in 1996.

=== Entering the mainstream (late 1990s) ===
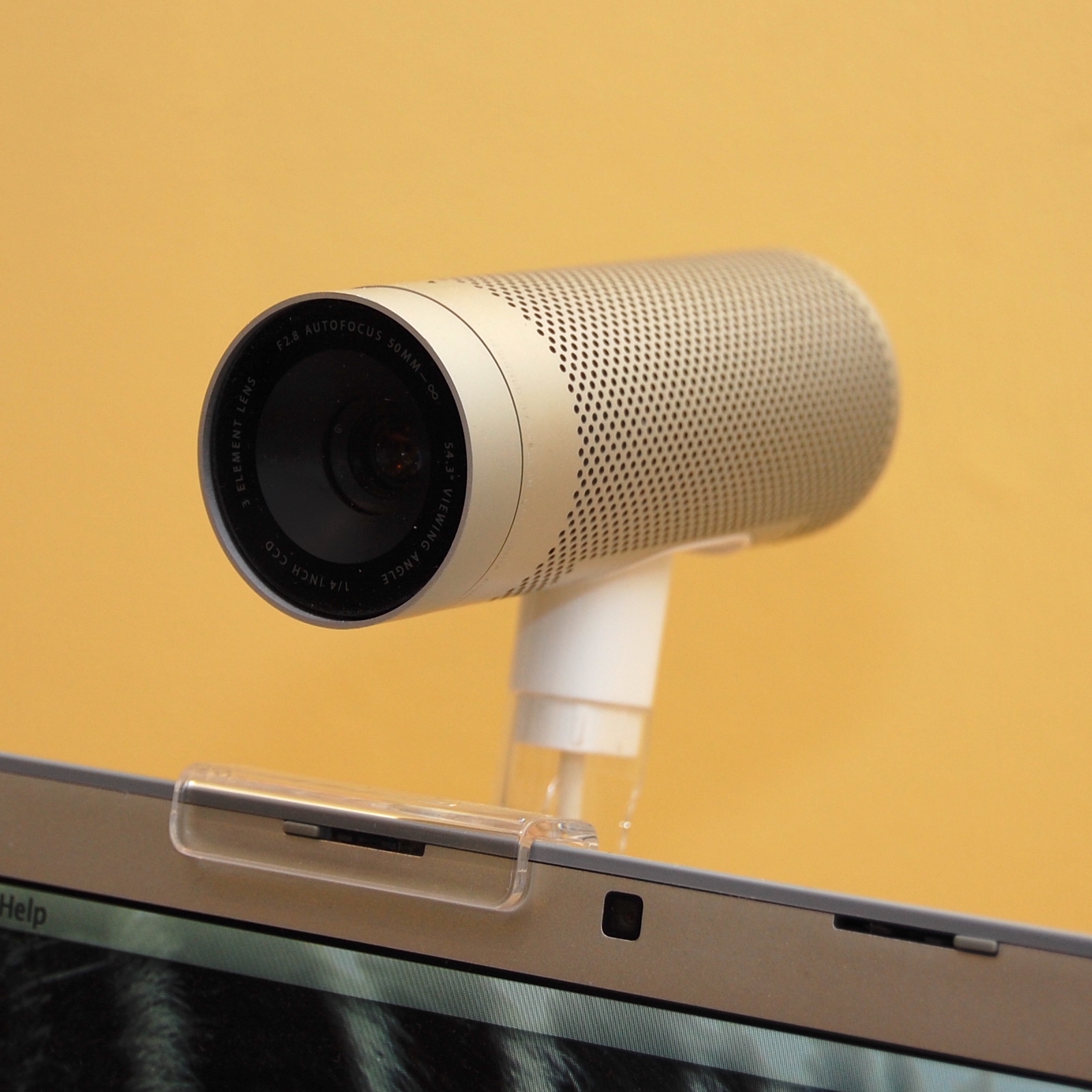
iSight webcam, released in 2003

One of the most widely reported-on webcam sites was JenniCam, created in 1996, which allowed Internet users to observe the life of its namesake constantly, in the same vein as the reality TV series Big Brother, launched four years later. Other cameras are mounted overlooking bridges, public squares, and other public places, their output made available on a public web page in accordance with the original concept of a "webcam". Aggregator websites have also been created, providing thousands of live video streams or up-to-date still pictures, allowing users to find live video streams based on location or other criteria.

In the late 1990s, Microsoft NetMeeting was the only videoconferencing software on PC in widespread use, making use of webcams. In the following years, instant messaging clients started adding webcam support: Yahoo Messenger introduced this with version 5.5 in 2002, allowing video calling in 20 frames per second using a webcam. MSN Messenger gained this in version 5.0 in 2003.

=== 2000s–2019 ===
Around the turn of the 21st century, computer hardware manufacturers began building webcams directly into laptop and desktop screens, thus eliminating the need to use an external USB or FireWire camera. Gradually webcams came to be used more for telecommunications, or videotelephony, between two people, or among several people, than for offering a view on a Web page to an unknown public.

For less than US$100 in 2012, a three-dimensional space webcam became available, producing videos and photos in 3D anaglyph image with a resolution up to 1280 × 480 pixels. Viewers must use 3D glasses to see the effect of three-dimensional images.

=== 2020 ===
With remote work entering the mainstream, the built-in cameras of average laptops were sometimes considered inadequate. Consequently, during the COVID-19 pandemic, a shortage of external webcams in retail occurred. Most laptops before and during the pandemic were made with cameras capping out at 720p recording quality at best, compared to the industry standard of 1080p or 4K seen in smartphones and televisions from the same period. The backlog on new developments for built-in webcams is the result of a design flaw with laptops being too thin to support the 7mm camera modules to fit inside, instead resorting to ~2.5mm. Also, the camera components are more expensive, and there has not been a high level of demand for this feature. Smartphones started to be used as a backup option or webcam replacement, with kits including lighting and tripods or downloadable apps.

== Technology ==
=== Image sensor ===
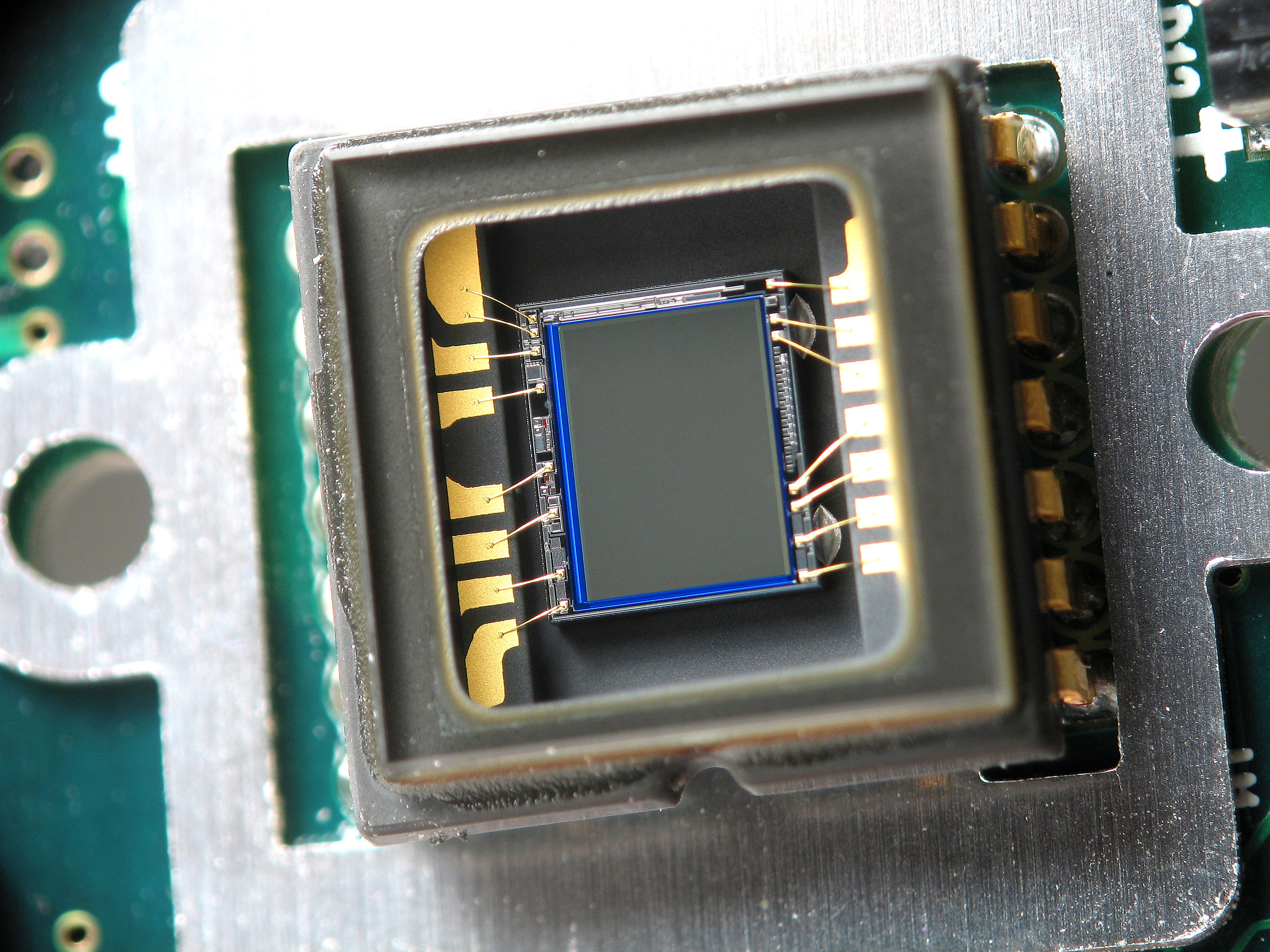
Charge-coupled device (CCD) image sensor of a webcam

Image sensors can be CMOS or CCD, the former being dominant for low-cost cameras, but CCD cameras do not necessarily outperform CMOS-based cameras in the low-price range. Most consumer webcams are capable of providing VGA-resolution video at a frame rate of 30 frames per second. Many newer devices can produce video in multi-megapixel resolutions, and a few can run at high frame rates such as the PlayStation Eye, which can produce 320×240 video at 120 frames per second. Most image sensors are sourced from Omnivision or Sony.

As webcams evolved simultaneously with display technologies, USB interface speeds and broadband internet speeds, the resolution went up gradually from 320×240, to 640×480, and some now even offer 1280×720 (aka 720p) or 1920×1080 (aka 1080p) resolution. Despite the low cost, the resolution offered as of 2019 is impressive, with now the low-end webcams offering resolutions of 720p, mid-range webcams offering 1080p resolution, and high-end webcams offering 4K resolution at 60 fps.

=== Optics ===
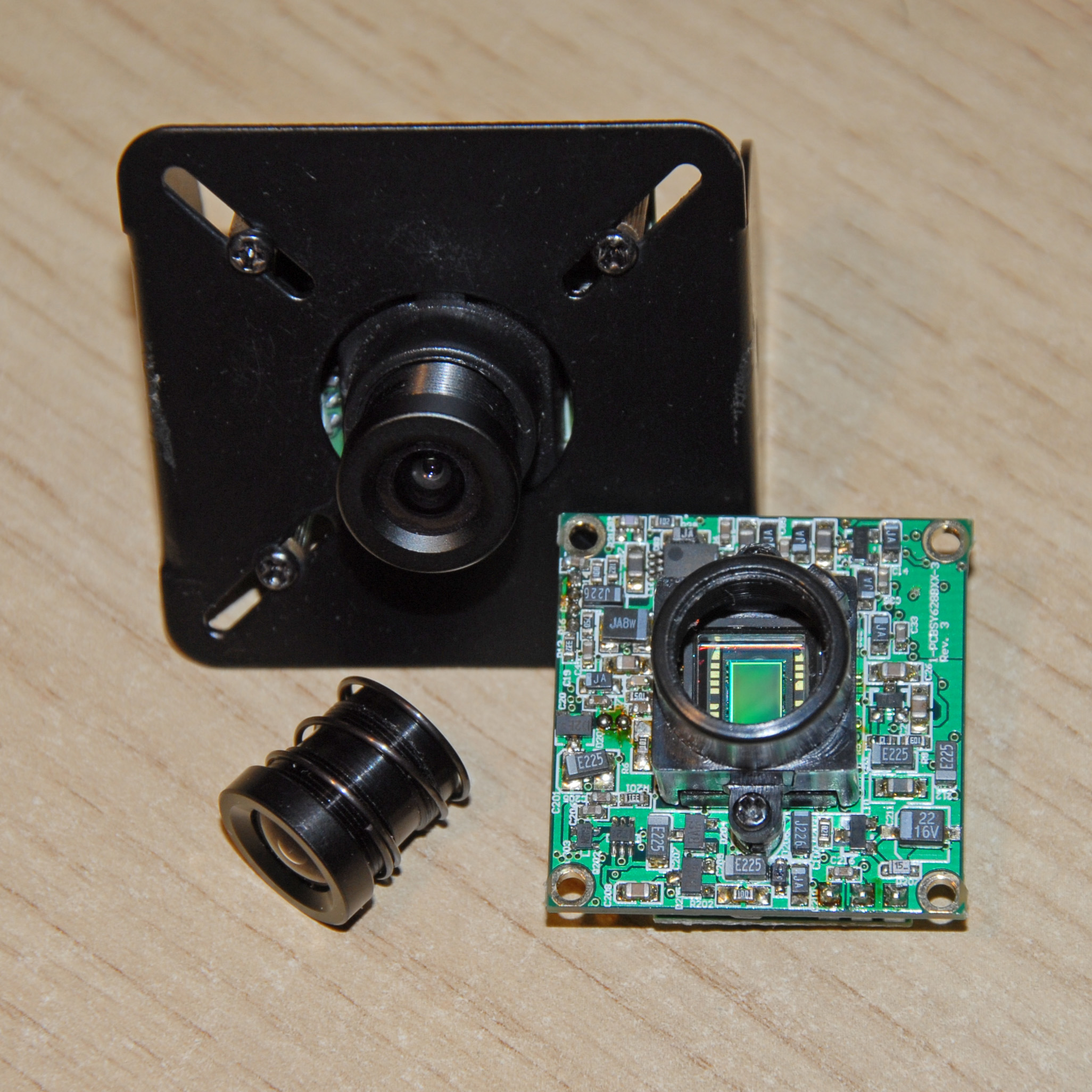
S-mount lens, designed to attach to the webcam's PCB

Various lenses are available, the most common in consumer-grade webcams being a plastic lens that can be manually moved in and out to focus the camera. Fixed-focus lenses, which have no provision for adjustment, are also available. As a camera system's depth of field is greater for small image formats and is greater for lenses with a large f-number (small aperture), the systems used in webcams have a sufficiently large depth of field that the use of a fixed-focus lens does not impact image sharpness to a great extent.

Most models use simple, focal-free optics (fixed focus, factory-set for the usual distance from the monitor to which it is fastened to the user) or manual focus.

Webcams can come with different presets and fields of view. Individual users can make use of less than 90° horizontal FOV for home offices and live streaming. Webcams with as much as 360° horizontal FOV can be used for small- to medium-sized rooms (sometimes even large rooms). Depending on the users' purposes, webcams in the market can display the whole room or just the general vicinity.

=== Internal software ===
As the Bayer filter is proprietary, any webcam contains some built-in image processing, separate from compression. Digital video streams are represented by huge amounts of data, burdening its transmission (from the image sensor, where the data is continuously created) and storage alike. Most if not all cheap webcams come with built-in ASIC to do video compression in real-time.

Support electronics read the image from the sensor and transmit it to the host computer. Most webcams come with a controller that translates video over USB from Sonix, Suyin, Ricoh, Realtek or others. Typically, each frame is transmitted uncompressed in RGB or YUV or compressed as JPEG. Some cameras, such as mobile-phone cameras, use a CMOS sensor with supporting electronics "on die", i.e. the sensor and the support electronics are built on a single silicon chip to save space and manufacturing costs. Most webcams feature built-in microphones to make video calling and videoconferencing more convenient.

=== Interface and external software ===
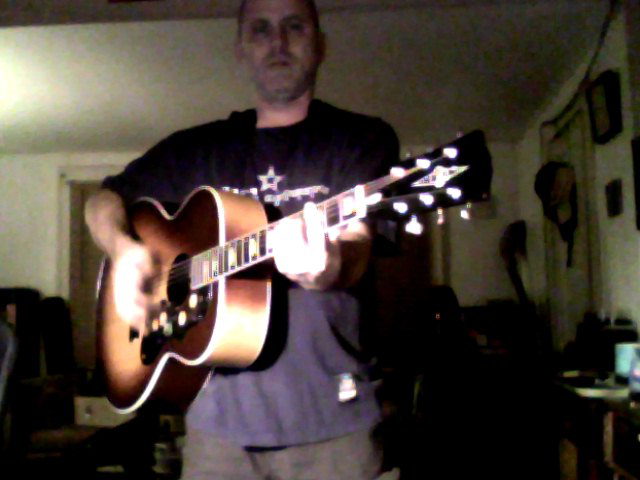
A picture taken by a webcam in 2010, showing a large amount of noise

Typical interfaces used by articles marketed as a "webcam" are USB, Ethernet and IEEE 802.11 (denominated as IP camera). Further interfaces such as e.g. Composite video, S-Video or FireWire were also available. The USB video device class (UVC) specification allows inter-connectivity of webcams to computers without the need for proprietary device drivers.

Various proprietary as well as free and open-source software is available to handle the UVC stream. One could use Guvcview or GStreamer and GStreamer-based software to handle the UVC stream. Another could use multiple USB cameras attached to the host computer the software resides on, and broadcast multiple streams at once over (Wireless) Ethernet, such as MotionEye. MotionEye can either be installed onto a Raspberry Pi as MotionEyeOs, or afterwards on Raspbian as well. MotionEye can also be set up on Debian, Raspbian is a variant of Debian. MotionEye V4.1.1 ( Aug '21 ) can only run on Debian 10 Buster ( oldstable ) and Python 2.7. Newer versions such as 3.X are not supported at this point of time according to Ccrisan, founder and author of MotionEye.

Various software tools in wide use can be employed to take video and pictures, such as PicMaster and Microsoft's Camera app (for use with Windows operating systems), Photo Booth (Mac), or Cheese (with Unix systems). For a more complete list see Comparison of webcam software.

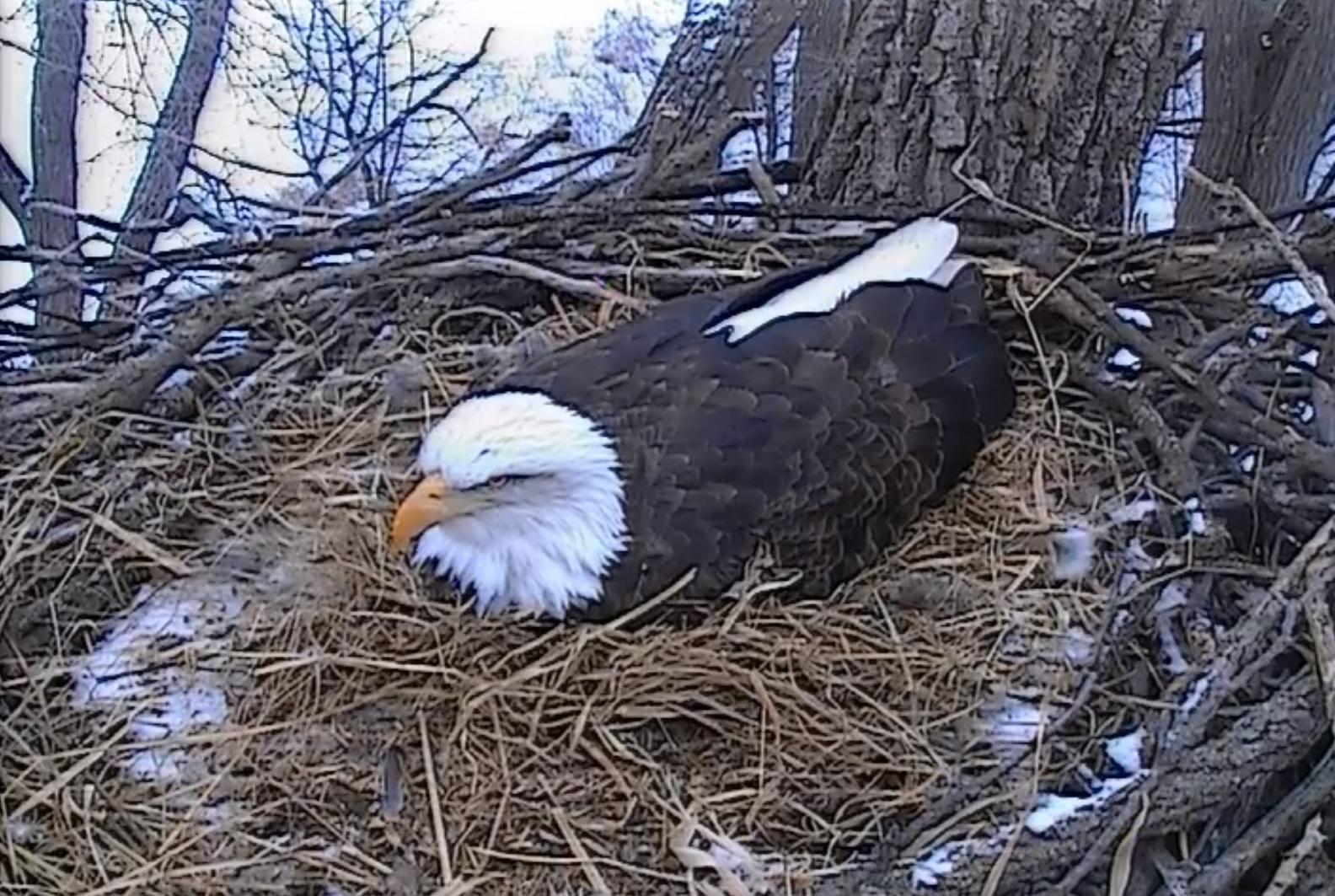
View of a bald eagle nest through a webcam

== Uses ==
The most popular use of webcams is the establishment of video links, permitting computers to act as videophones or videoconference stations. For example, Apple's iSight camera, which is built into Apple laptops, iMacs and a majority of iPhones, can be used for video chat sessions, using the Messages instant messaging program. Other popular uses include security surveillance, computer vision, video broadcasting, recording social videos, and, increasingly, virtual tourism and wildlife observation.

=== Videotelephony ===
Webcams can be added to instant messaging, text chat services such as AOL Instant Messenger, and VoIP services such as the now retired Skype, one-to-one live video communication over the Internet has now reached millions of mainstream PC users worldwide. Improved video quality has helped webcams encroach on traditional video conferencing systems. New features such as automatic lighting controls, real-time enhancements (retouching, wrinkle smoothing and vertical stretch), automatic face tracking and autofocus, assist users by providing substantial ease-of-use, further increasing the popularity of webcams.

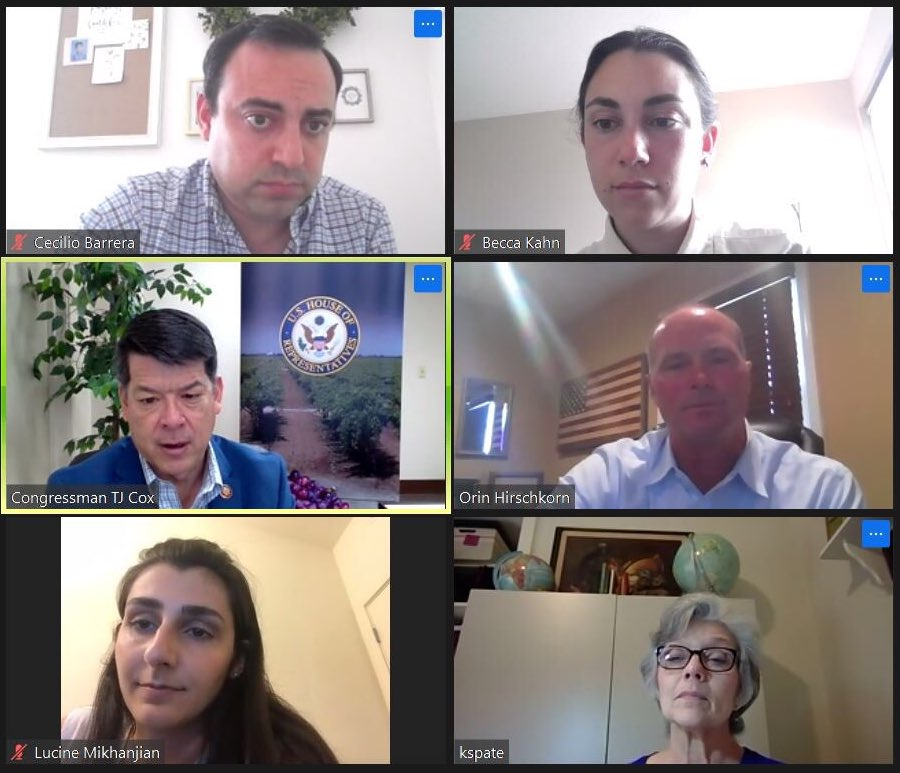
A video call session with use of webcams

Webcams can also encourage remote work, enabling people to work remotely via the Internet. This usage was crucial to the survival of many businesses during the COVID-19 pandemic, when in-person office work was discouraged. Businesses, schools, and individuals have relied on video conferencing instead of spending on business travel for meetings. Moreover, the number of video conferencing cameras and software have multiplied since then due to their popularity.

Webcam features and performance can vary by program, computer operating system, and also by the computer's processor capabilities. Video calling support has also been added to several popular instant messaging programs.

Webcams allow for inexpensive, real-time video chat and webcasting, in both amateur and professional pursuits. They are frequently used in online dating and for online personal services offered mainly by women when camgirling. However, the ease of webcam use through the Internet for video chat has also caused issues. For example, moderation system of various video chat websites such as Omegle has been criticized as being ineffective, with sexual content still rampant. In a 2013 case, the transmission of nude photos and videos via Omegle from a teenage girl to a schoolteacher resulted in a child pornography charge.

The popularity of webcams among teenagers with Internet access has raised concern about the use of webcams for cyber-bullying. Webcam recordings of teenagers, including underage teenagers, are frequently posted on popular Web forums and imageboards such as 4chan.

=== Monitoring ===
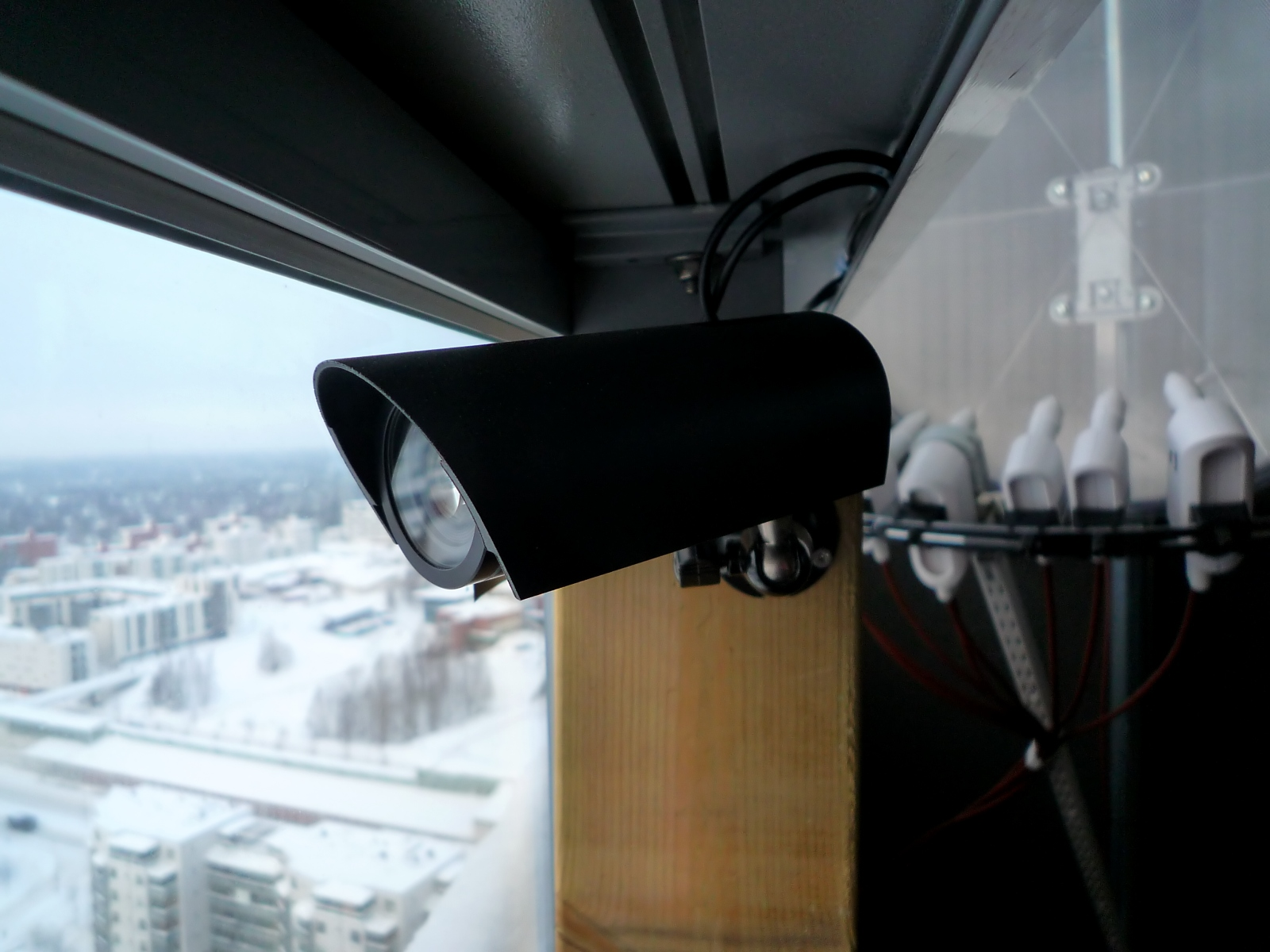
Webcam mounted on a building, used as a CCTV

Webcams can be used as security cameras. Software is available to allow PC-connected cameras to watch for movement and sound, recording both when they are detected. These recordings can then be saved to the computer, e-mailed, or uploaded to the Internet. In one well-publicised case, a computer e-mailed images of the burglar during the theft of the computer, enabling the owner to give police a clear picture of the burglar's face even after the computer had been stolen.

In December 2011, Russia announced that 290,000 Webcams would be installed in 90,000 polling stations to monitor the 2012 Russian presidential election. Webcams may be installed at places such as childcare centres, offices, shops and private areas to monitor security and general activity.

=== Astrophotography ===
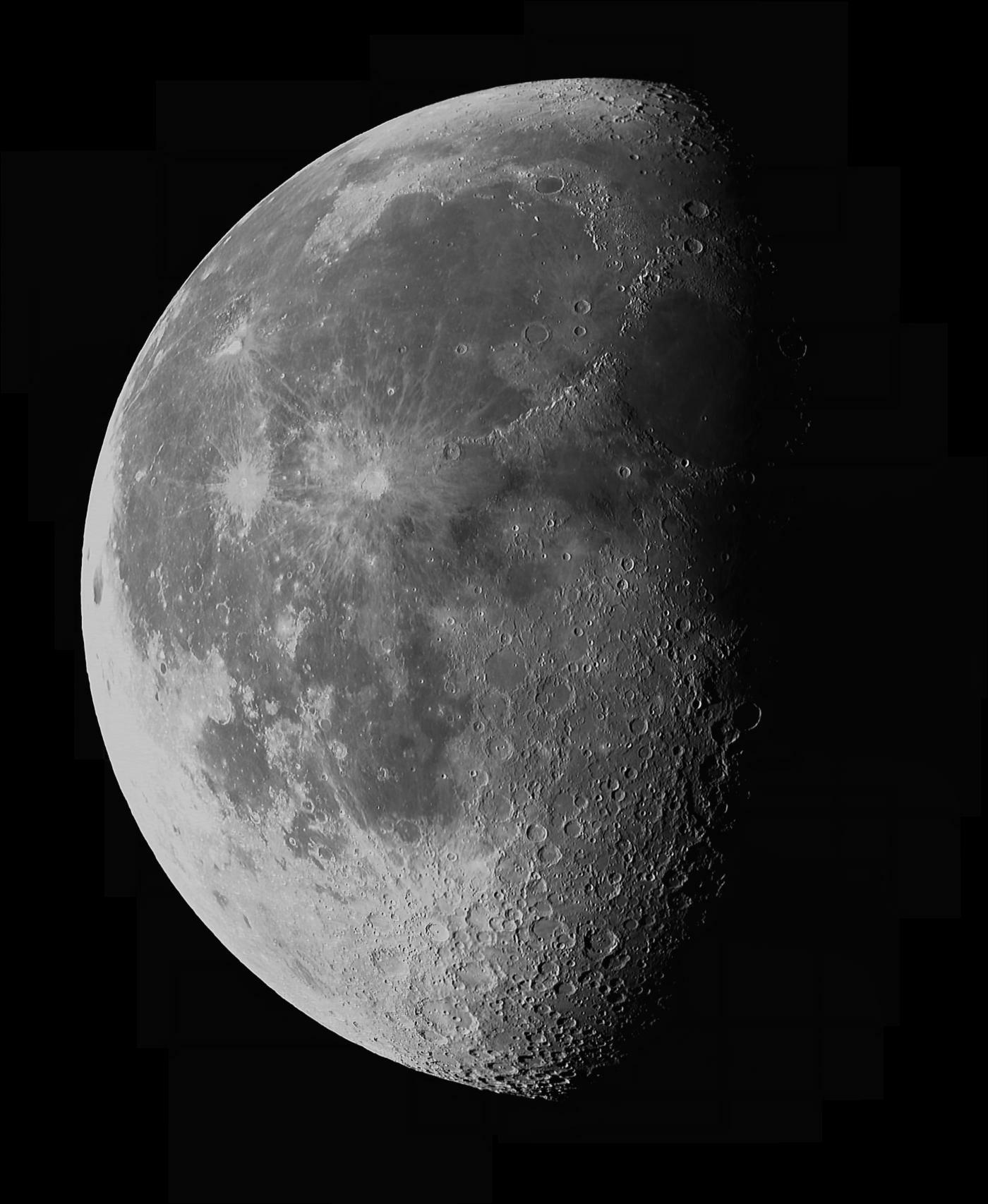
An image of the Moon created by stitching images from a webcam

With very-low-light capability, a few specific models of webcams are very popular to photograph the night sky by astronomers and astro photographers. Mostly, these are manual-focus cameras and contain an old CCD array instead of comparatively newer CMOS array. The lenses of the cameras are removed and then these are attached to telescopes to record images, video, still, or both. In newer techniques, videos of very faint objects are taken for a couple of seconds and then all the frames of the video are "stacked" together to obtain a still image of respectable contrast.

=== Laser beam profiling ===
A webcam's CCD response is linearly proportional to the incoming light. Therefore, webcams are suitable to record laser beam profiles, after the lens is removed. The resolution of a laser beam profiler depends on the pixel size. Commercial webcams are usually designed to record color images. The size of a webcam's color pixel depends on the model and may lie in the range of 5 to 10 μm. However, a color pixel consists of four black and white pixels each equipped with a color filter (for details see Bayer filter). Although these color filters work well in the visible, they may be rather transparent in the near infrared. By switching a webcam into the Bayer-mode it is possible to access the information of the single pixels and a resolution below 3 μm was possible.

== Privacy concerns ==
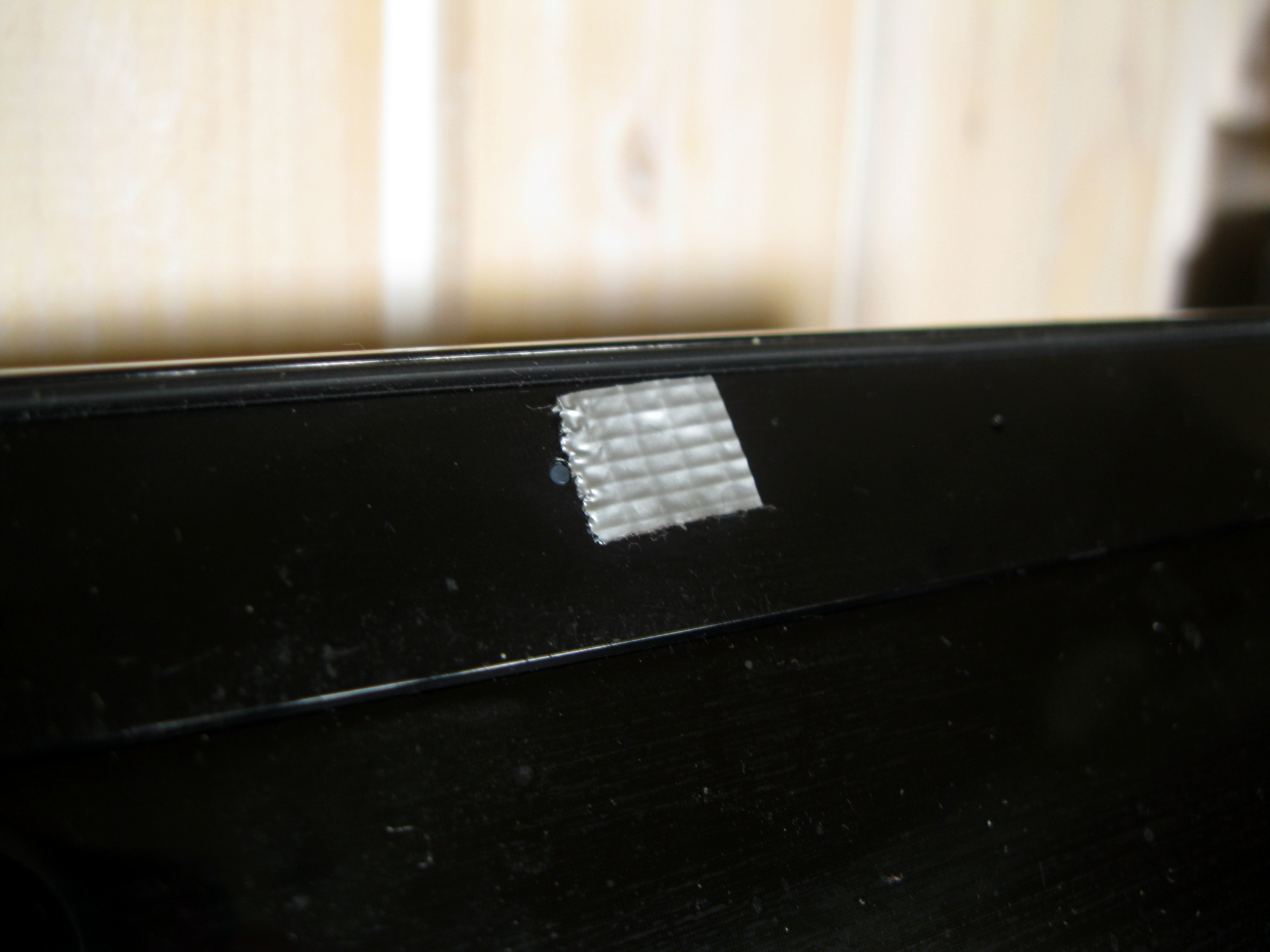
Tape over the built-in laptop webcam to block spies from viewing activities

Many users do not wish the continuous exposure for which webcams were originally intended, but rather prefer privacy. Such privacy is lost when malware allow malicious hackers to activate the webcam without the user's knowledge, providing the hackers with a live video and audio feed. This is a particular concern on many laptop computers, as such cameras normally cannot be physically disabled if hijacked by such a Trojan Horse program or other similar spyware programs.

Cameras such as Apple's older external iSight cameras include lens covers to thwart this. Some webcams have built-in hardwired LED indicators that light up whenever the camera is active, sometimes only in video mode. However, it is possible, depending on the circuit design of a webcam, for malware to circumvent the indicator and activate the camera surreptitiously, as researchers demonstrated in the case of a MacBook's built-in camera in 2013.

Various companies sell sliding lens covers and stickers that allow users to retrofit a computer or smartphone to close access to the camera lens as needed. One such company reported having sold more than 250,000 such items from 2013 to 2016. However, any opaque material will work just as well.

The process of attempting to hack into a person's webcam and activate it without the webcam owner's permission has been called camfecting, a portmanteau of cam and infecting. The remotely activated webcam can be used to watch anything within the webcam's field of vision. Camfecting is most often carried out by infecting the victim's computer with a computer virus.

== See also ==
- Action camera
- Camera phone
- IP camera
- List of video telecommunication services and product brands
- Trail camera
