= PrintKey 2000 =

- Screenshot interface with the English Wikipedia's Main Page
- Original author: Alfred Bolliger
- Final release: 5.10 / 1999; 27 years ago
- Operating system: Windows
- Type: Screenshot
- License: Freeware

PrintKey 2000 is a discontinued screenshot software utility for Windows that rose to popularity in the late 1990s. It was developed by Alfred Bolliger and originally released as freeware in 1999. It allows the user to modify screenshots after they are taken. The program is activated by the Print Screen key or a configurable hotkey, then displays an image of the screenshot for editing.

PrintKey 2000, though lacking some of the features of paid programs such as SnagIt, was well received. Owing to the fact it is compatible with Windows systems up to and including Windows 10, it still sees some use to this day.
