= Shotty (software) =

- Shotty on Windows 8
- Original author: Thomas Baumann
- Release: October 20, 2010; 15 years ago
- Stable release: 2.0.2 / February 25, 2011; 15 years ago
- Operating system: Microsoft Windows
- Platform: .NET Framework
- Type: Screenshot utility
- License: Freeware
- Website: shotty.devs-on.net

Shotty is a Microsoft Windows application that captures screenshots. A key benefit of Shotty is that it captures Windows Aero's glass-like transparency and drop shadow effects on window borders if running on Windows Vista or Windows 7. Because of the needed alpha channel, Shotty writes out screenshots to PNG files. It was originally developed by Thomas Baumann and released as freeware. It was available either as installed software or as a portable application.

Shotty also has various features for modifying screenshots, including cropping, blurring, annotations, drawing rectangles to draw focus to one section of the image, and highlighting text. Shotty also allows direct uploading to various image hosting websites for sharing screenshots over the Internet. Unlike most other screenshot utilities, Shotty was incapable of taking screenshots of arbitrary portions of the screen; users could either take a screenshot of the entire desktop or the active window only. The software also supports time-delayed screenshots. When capturing the entire desktop, Shotty automatically defines crop points around every visible window in case the user desired to capture only a single window; according to Window Forest, this made it useful for users with cluttered desktops.

== See also ==
- Snagit
- Jing
