= Phatch =

Raster graphics editing software

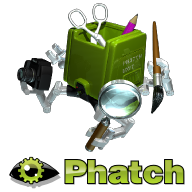

- Phatch 0.1 running under GNOME.
- Original author: Stani Michiels
- Stable release: 0.2.7 / 2010; 16 years ago
- Written in: Python (wxPython)
- Operating system: Cross-platform
- Available in: Multilingual
- Type: Raster graphics editor
- License: GPL-3.0-or-later
- Website: photobatch.stani.be at the Wayback Machine (archived August 18, 2015)

Phatch (PHoto & bATCH) is a raster graphics editor used to batch process digital graphics and photographs. Phatch can be used on the desktop as a GUI program or on the server as a console program.

== Operation ==
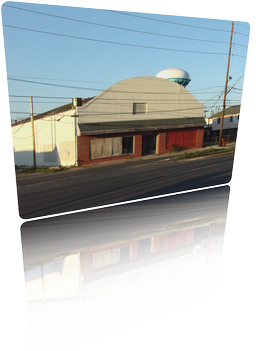
Phatch includes tools for rounded corners, reflection, and perspective as shown in this thumbnail.

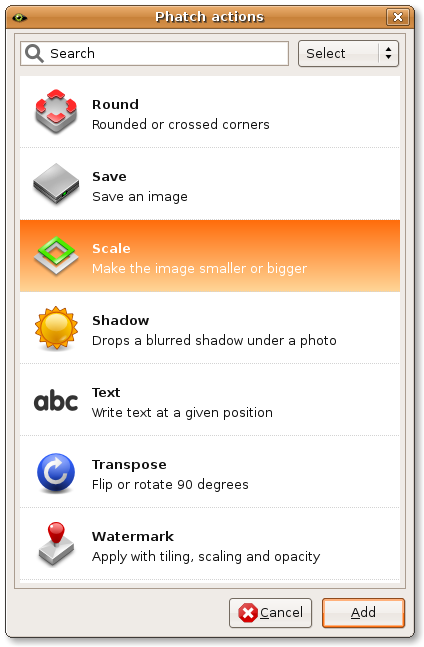
Dialog to add Phatch actions

Typical actions include resizing, rotating, cropping, converting, applying shadows, rounded corners, perspective, reflection, and converting between different image formats. Phatch can also be used to rename or copy image files based on the Exif or IPTC Information Interchange Model tags.

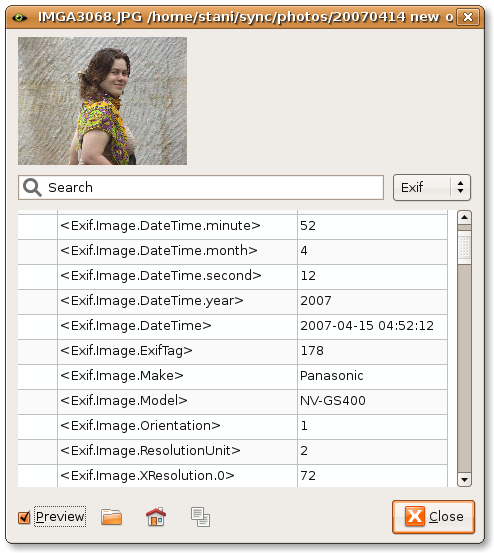
Exploring Exif tags in Phatch

The image inspector can be used to explore the metadata tags stored in images. The tabs can be passed to any action, which is especially useful for renaming or copying files, but also for data-stamping such as date, time, aperture or shutter speed on the picture. Multiple inspectors can be opened at once to compare tag values with a preview of the image.

Phatch can turn itself into a droplet which stays a small graphic on top of the other windows. It processes any images which are dragged and dropped on it.

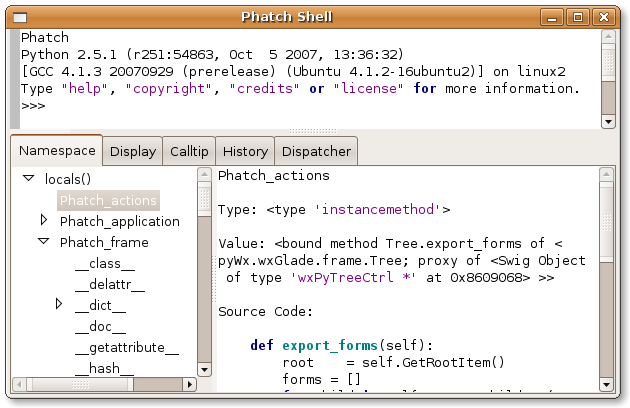
Phatch interactive Python shell

Phatch has a built in interactive Python console to explore the internals of the program.

== Development ==
Phatch is being developed on Linux (Ubuntu) by Stani Michiels. The logo, mascot and some icons are designed by Admiror Design Studio. The other icons are taken from the Open Clip Art Library. The image processing of Phatch is done with the Python Imaging Library. Phatch uses Bazaar in combination with Launchpad for coordinating its development and translations. Phatch has a Python (wxPython) API and is extensible through Python.

== Limitations ==
Phatch does not provide a live preview of the image manipulation and has no built in support for remote file systems. Although Phatch runs from source on Windows and Mac OS X, there are no final binary installers available for these platforms, although a pre-release binary installer for OS X was made available by the developers in May 2010.

== Distribution ==
The source code of Phatch is released on its homepage. Binary packages are available in the repositories of the major Linux distributions such as Debian, Ubuntu, Arch Linux, Fedora and OpenSuse. Phatch requires Python, Python Imaging Library and wxPython (2.6 or more) for the GUI. Users can install pyexiv2 for better Exif and IPTC IIM support.

Currently the website is down and Phatch is no longer downloadable along with python dependencies for Phatch.

== Critical reception ==
Softpedia's editor's review of Phatch 0.0.bzr157 overall awarded 4 stars, highlighting the clean and simple interface, program stability, and batch processing actions. Allowing the user to use Python to create additional batch process was also seen as an advantage over similar products. Criticisms included the lack of a help file or preferences menu. Some processes such as "Convert Mode" caused errors that were not reported to the error log.

It was the opinion of Linux Pratique magazine that Phatch 0.1.3 filled the gap between GIMP and Imagemagick, with a user-friendly interface saving a lot of time for batch processing. Overall it was felt that it offered fewer features than these two programs.

Phatch 0.1.6 was featured together with GIMP on the front page of Linux+ magazine, May 2009.
