= Screenshot =

Digital image output of computer display

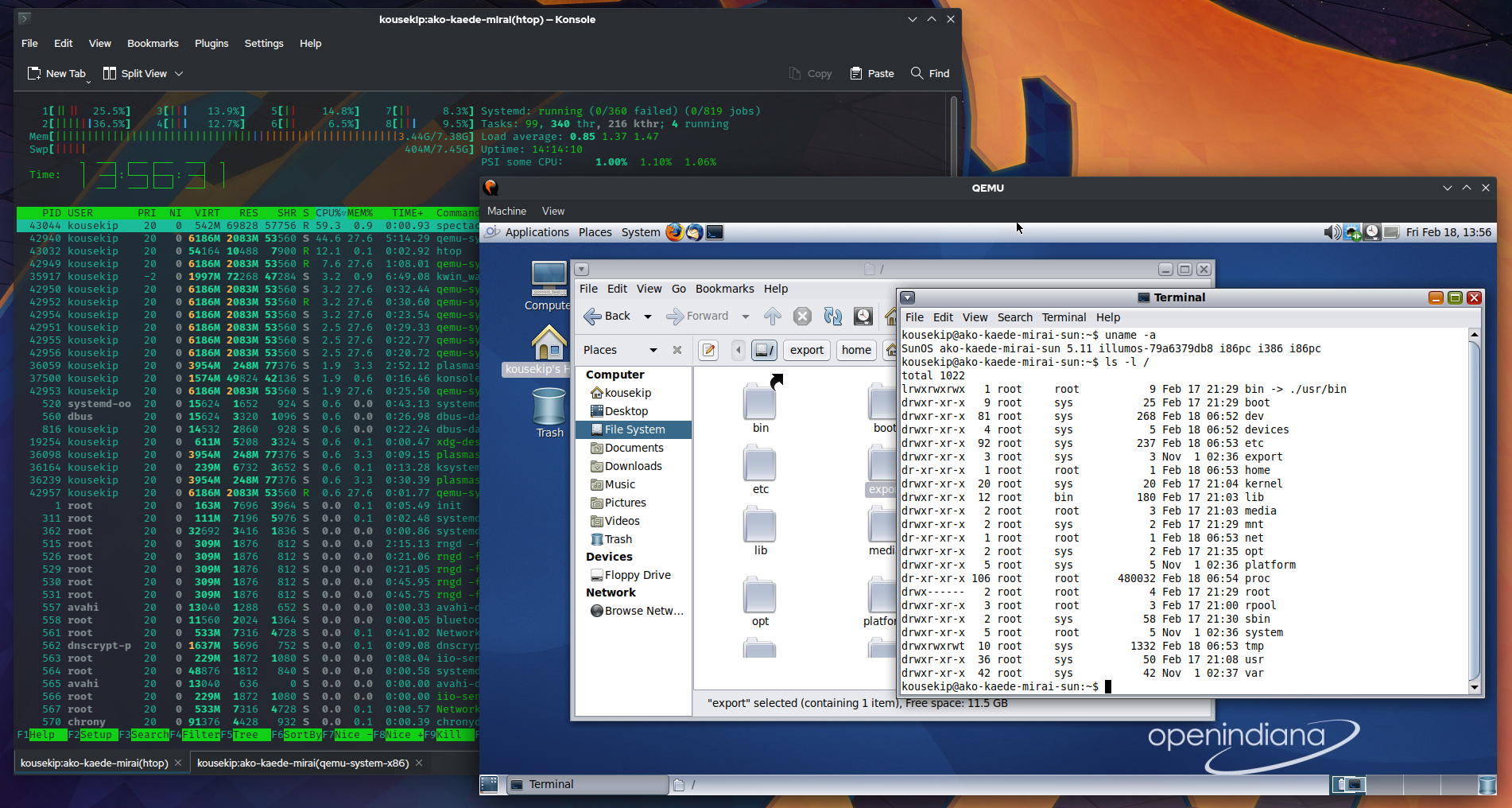
A screenshot of a computer display

A screenshot (also known as screen capture or screen grab) is an analog or digital image that shows the contents of a computer display. A screenshot is created by a (film) camera shooting the screen or the operating system or software running on the device powering the display.

The separate process of taking still frames, images from video or film, is sometimes called still screenshots, screen captures or screen grabs.

== Screenshot techniques ==
=== Digital techniques ===
The first screenshots were created with the first interactive computers around 1960. Through the 1980s, computer operating systems did not universally have built-in functionality for capturing screenshots. Sometimes text-only screens could be dumped to a text file, but the result would only capture the content of the screen, not the appearance, nor were graphics screens preservable this way. Some systems had a BSAVE command that could be used to capture the area of memory where screen data was stored, but this required access to a BASIC prompt. Systems with composite video output could be connected to a VCR, and entire screencasts preserved this way.

Most screenshots are raster images, but some vector-based GUI environments like Cairo are capable of generating vector screenshots.

=== Photographic techniques ===
Screenshot kits were available for standard (film) cameras that included a long antireflective hood to attach between the screen and camera lens, as well as a closeup lens for the camera. Polaroid film was popular for capturing screenshots, because of the instant results and close-focusing capability of Polaroid cameras.

== Applications and uses ==
Screenshots serve various purposes in digital communication and documentation:

Documentation and Support

- Error documentation for technical support, where screenshots of error messages or dialog windows are often necessary
- Recording website states and development progress for historical comparison
- Facilitating communication within development teams when evaluating programming steps

Educational and Instructional

- Creating tutorials and step-by-step guides where screenshots enhance reader comprehension
- Demonstrating software functionality for advertising or training purposes
- Providing user assistance and guidance for program usage

Legal and Security

- Serving as real-time evidence in cases of online harassment or cyberbullying, where screenshots combined with IP addresses can be used as evidence for legally relevant actions
- Creating proof images of achieved game scores (though relatively easy to falsify)
- Pixel-precise measurement of sizes and distances, particularly useful in interface and web design

Design and Development

- Copying images from programs that cannot otherwise save content
- Preserving content that might be temporary or ephemeral

== Screenshot tools ==
Notable software for capturing screenshots include:

- Bandicam
- Camtasia
- CamStudio
- CloudApp
- Greenshot
- IrfanView
- Jing
- KSnapshot
- Lightscreen
- Snipping Tool
- Snip and Sketch
- Monosnap
- PrintKey 2000
- Screenpal
- scrot
- ShareX
- Shotty
- Snagit
- Snapz Pro X
- VVCap
- Window Clippings
- Xfire
- XnView
- Xwd
- PicPick

Some web browsers, for example Firefox and Microsoft Edge, have a screenshot tool which can be used to capture a whole web page or part of it.

== Legal evidence value ==
The acceptance of screenshots as evidence in legal proceedings varies by jurisdiction and context. Court decisions have shown mixed approaches to the evidential value of self-created screenshots.

Some courts have questioned the reliability of screenshots as standalone evidence due to their potential for manipulation, while others have accepted them as sufficient proof of displayed content when properly authenticated. The legal weight given to screenshots often depends on factors such as the chain of custody, technical metadata, and corroborating evidence.

== Print production considerations ==
Screenshots present as RGB data by default. When converting to CMYK for print production, such as offset printing, several technical considerations must be addressed:

- Image resolution requirements for print quality
- Color separation processes and color space conversion
- Text antialiasing and subpixel rendering effects

These factors require careful attention during the conversion process to ensure optimal print quality.

== Copyright issues ==
Some companies believe the use of screenshots is an infringement of copyright on their program, as it is a derivative work of the widgets and other art created for the software. Regardless of copyright, screenshots may still be legally used under the principle of fair use in the U.S. or fair dealing and similar laws in other countries. Screenshots have also been an object of study in academic research, in fields such as law, media studies, and semiotics.

== See also ==
- Comparison of screencasting software
- Codeless test automation
- Digital forensics
- Print screen
- Screencast
- Screen recording
- Still frame
- Thumbshot
- Video capture
