= Bitmap format =

Bitmap format is:

- Generic term for file formats for raster graphics images
- Specific term for Windows bitmap (BMP) or X Bitmap (XBM) file format
