= Euro gold and silver commemorative coins (Netherlands) =

The commemorative coins of Netherlands are minted by the KNM (the Royal Dutch Mint)

The value of a Dutch silver coin corresponds with the theme of the coin. If the coin has a royal theme, then the face value is 10 euro. Any other subject and the coin will be of face value 5 euro. The same principle with the gold coins, which have face values of 10 euro and 20 euro. Sometimes also 50 euro gold coins are issued.

== 2002 ==
Royal wedding			
Designer: Hans van Houwelingen		Mint: Royal Dutch Mint	
Value: €10	Alloy: Ag (925)	Quantity: 1.000.000; 130.000	Quality: BU; Proof
Issued: 2002	Diameter: 33 mm	Weight: 17.8 g	Market Value:
Royal wedding			
Designer: Hans van Houwelingen		Mint: Royal Dutch Mint	
Value: €20	Alloy: Au (900)	Quantity: 33.000	Quality: prooflike
Issued: 2002	Diameter: 22.5 mm	Weight: 6.72 g	Market Value:

== 2003 ==
Vincent van Gogh			
Designer: Karel Martens		Mint: Royal Dutch Mint	
Value: €5	Alloy: Ag (925)	Quantity: 1,000,000; 100,000	Quality: Unc proof
Issued: 2003	Diameter: 29 mm	Weight: 11.9 g	Market Value:
Vincent van Gogh			
Designer: Karel Martens		Mint: Royal Dutch Mint	
Value: €10	Alloy: Au (900)	Quantity: 20,000	Quality: Proof
Issued: 2003	Diameter: 22.5 mm	Weight: 6.72 g	Market Value:
Birth of princess Amalia			
Designer: Driessens/Verstappen		Mint: Royal Dutch Mint	
Value: €10	Alloy: Ag (925)	Quantity: 50.000	Quality: proof
Issued: 2003	Diameter: 33 mm	Weight: 17.8 g	Market Value:
Birth of princess Amalia			
Designer: Driessens/Verstappen		Mint: Royal Dutch Mint	
Value: €20	Alloy: Au (900)	Quantity: 7.000	Quality: Proof
Issued: 2003	Diameter: 25 mm	Weight: 8.5 g	Market Value:
Birth of princess Amalia			
Designer: Driessens/Verstappen		Mint: Royal Dutch Mint	
Value: €50	Alloy: Au (900)	Quantity: 3.500	Quality: Proof
Issued: 2003	Diameter: 27 mm	Weight: 13.44 g	Market Value:

== 2004 ==
EU enlargement			
Designer: Mieras/Mieras		Mint: Royal Dutch Mint	
Value: €5	Alloy: Ag (925)	Quantity: 55,000	Quality: proof
Issued: 2004	Diameter: 29 mm	Weight: 11.9 g	Market Value:
EU enlargement			
Designer: Mieras/Mieras		Mint: Royal Dutch Mint	
Value: €10	Alloy: Au (900)	Quantity: 6,000	Quality: proof
Issued: 2004	Diameter: 22.5mm	Weight: 6.72g	Market Value:
Koninkrijksstatuut			
Designer: Rudy J. Luijters		Mint: Royal Dutch Mint	
Value: €5	Alloy: Ag (925)	Quantity: 30,000	Quality: proof
Issued: 2004	Diameter: 29 mm	Weight: 11.9 g	Market Value:
Koninkrijksstatuut			
Designer: Rudy J. Luijters		Mint: Royal Dutch Mint	
Value: €10	Alloy: Au (900)	Quantity: 5,000	Quality: proof
Issued: 2004	Diameter: 22.5mm	Weight: 6.72g	Market Value:

== 2005 ==
60 years peace and freedom			
Designer: Suzan Drummen		Mint: Royal Dutch Mint	
Value: €5	Alloy: Ag (925)	Quantity: 40,000	Quality: proof
Issued: 2005	Diameter: 29 mm	Weight: 11.9 g	Market Value:
60 years peace and freedom			
Designer: Suzan Drummen		Mint: Royal Dutch Mint	
Value: €10	Alloy: Au (900)	Quantity: 6,000	Quality: proof
Issued: 2005	Diameter: 22.5 mm	Weight: 6.72 g	Market Value:
25 years Queen Beatrix			
Designer: Germaine Kruip		Mint: Royal Dutch Mint	
Value: €10	Alloy: Ag (925)	Quantity: 100,000; 60,000	Quality: BU; Proof
Issued: 2005	Diameter: 33 mm	Weight: 17.8 g	Market Value:
25 years Queen Beatrix			
Designer: Germaine Kruip		Mint: Royal Dutch Mint	
Value: €20	Alloy: Au (900)	Quantity: 5,000	Quality: proof
Issued: 2005	Diameter: 22.5 mm	Weight: 6.72 g	Market Value:
25 years Queen Beatrix			
Designer: Germaine Kruip		Mint: Royal Dutch Mint	
Value: €50	Alloy: Au (900)	Quantity: 3,500	Quality: proof
Issued: 2005	Diameter: 27 mm	Weight: 13.44 g	Market Value:

== 2006 ==
400 years Australia friendship			
Designer: Irma Boom		Mint: Royal Dutch Mint	
Value: €5	Alloy: Ag (925)	Quantity: 22.500	Quality: proof
Issued: 2006	Diameter: 29 mm	Weight: 11.9 g	Market Value:
400 years Australia friendship			
Designer: Irma Boom		Mint: Royal Dutch Mint	
Value: €10	Alloy: Au (900)	Quantity: 3.500	Quality: proof
Issued: 2006	Diameter: 22.5 mm	Weight: 6.72g	Market Value:
Rembrandt van Rijn			
Designer: Berend Strik		Mint: Royal Dutch Mint	
Value: €5	Alloy: Ag (925)	Quantity: 35.000	Quality: proof
Issued: 2006	Diameter: 29 mm	Weight: 11.9 g	Market Value:
Rembrandt van Rijn			
Designer: Berend Strik		Mint: Royal Dutch Mint	
Value: €10	Alloy: Au (900)	Quantity: 8.500	Quality: proof
Issued: 2006	Diameter: 22.5 mm	Weight: 6.72 g	Market Value:
400 years tax			
Designer: Hennie Bouwe		Mint: Royal Dutch Mint	
Value: €5	Alloy: Ag (925)	Quantity: 15.000	Quality: proof
Issued: 2006	Diameter: 29 mm	Weight: 11.9 g	Market Value:
400 years tax			
Designer: Hennie Bouwe		Mint: Royal Dutch Mint	
Value: €10	Alloy: Au (900)	Quantity: 5.500	Quality: Proof
Issued: 2006	Diameter: 22.5 mm	Weight: 6.72 g	Market Value:

== 2007 ==
Michiel de Ruyter			
Designer: Martijn Engelbregt		Mint: Royal Dutch Mint	
Value: €5	Alloy: Ag (925)	Quantity: 17.500	Quality: proof
Issued: 2007	Diameter: 29 mm	Weight: 11.9 g	Market Value:
Michiel de Ruyter			
Designer: Martijn Engelbregt		Mint: Royal Dutch Mint	
Value: €10	Alloy: Au (900)	Quantity: 7.000	Quality: Proof
Issued: 2007	Diameter: 22.5 mm	Weight: 6.72 g	Market Value:

== 2008 ==
Dutch Architecture			
Designer: Stani Michiels		Mint: Royal Dutch Mint	
Value: €5	Alloy: Silver coated copper	Quantity:	Quality: Uncirculated
Issued: 2008	Diameter: 29 mm	Weight: 10.5 g	Market Value:
Dutch Architecture			
Designer: Stani Michiels		Mint: Royal Dutch Mint	
Value: €5	Alloy: Ag (925)	Quantity: 30.000	Quality: Proof
Issued: 2008	Diameter: 33 mm	Weight: 15.5 g	Market Value:
Dutch Architecture			
Designer: Stani Michiels		Mint: Royal Dutch Mint	
Value: €10	Alloy: Au (900)	Quantity: 8.000	Quality: Proof
Issued: 2008	Diameter: 22.5 mm	Weight: 6.72 g	Market Value:

== 2009 ==
Manhattan			
Designer: Ronald van Tienhoven		Mint: Royal Dutch Mint	
Value: €5	Alloy: Ag (925)	Quantity: 20.000	Quality: proof
Issued: 2009	Diameter: 33 mm	Weight: 15.5 g	Market Value:
Manhattan			
Designer: Ronald van Tienhoven		Mint: Royal Dutch Mint	
Value: €10	Alloy: Au (900)	Quantity: 6.500	Quality: Proof
Issued: 2009	Diameter: 22.5 mm	Weight: 6.72 g	Market Value:
