= Scrot =

Command-line screen capturing application

scrot
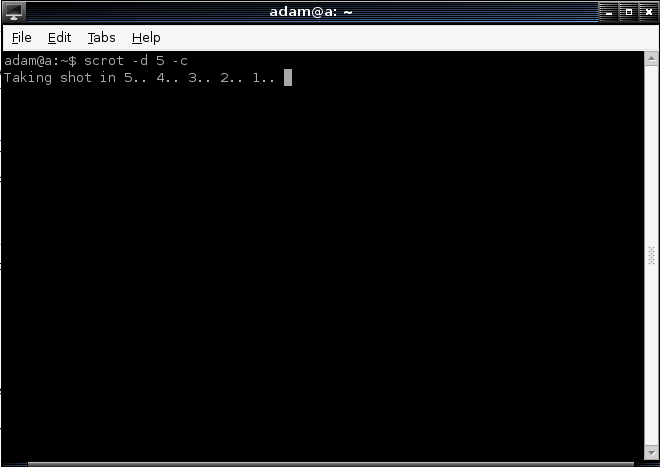
- scrot 0.8 taking a screenshot with delay and countdown parameters
- Original author: Tom Gilbert
- Developers: Tom Gilbert; Daniel T. Borelli; Guilherme Janczak; Joao Eriberto Mota Filho
- Release: October 26, 2000; 25 years ago
- Stable release: 2.0.0 / 14 March 2026; 4 months ago
- Written in: C
- Operating system: Unix-like
- Platform: X Window System
- Available in: English
- Type: Screen capturing
- License: MIT-feh
- Website: www.linuxbrit.co.uk/scrot/ website archives
- Repository: github.com/resurrecting-open-source-projects/scrot

scrot is a minimalist command line screen capturing application. It allows a substantial degree of flexibility by specifying parameters on command line, including the ability to invoke a third-party utility to manipulate the resulting screenshot.

== Description ==
Features of the program include the ability to limit the scope of capturing to a specific screen area, to set the delay (if needed to capture some menu or another UI element which is shown only when focused) and to specify the filename template using wildcards (including those of the strftime function from the C standard library). Other features include creating thumbnails of the taken screenshots and specifying the quality of the resulting image if lossy format is required.

The scrot utility follows the UNIX philosophy principles formulated by Doug McIlroy: the only thing it does is screen capturing, though it allows one to specify a command for further manipulations of a resulting file.

The ability to control scrot from the command line allows the user to run it over the network with tools like OpenSSH to get a screenshot of a remote desktop or execute it as the window manager command binding.

In February 2019, scrot was forked as part of the Resurrecting Open Source Project. This updated fork is being used for the Arch Linux package of scrot.

As of version 1.8.1, 2023-01-21, scrot does not support Wayland-based systems because, by design, Wayland is more secure than X11 and does not allow one application to capture the content of other applications' windows.

== See also ==
- GNOME Screenshot
- KSnapshot
- xwd
