= GD Graphics Library =

Graphics library

- Developer: Thomas Boutell
- Initial release: 1994; 32 years ago
- Stable release: 2.3.3 / 12 September 2021; 4 years ago
- Repository: https://github.com/libgd/libgd
- Written in: C
- Operating system: Cross-platform
- Type: Graphics library
- License: BSD-like license
- Website: libgd.github.io

The GD Graphics Library is a graphics software library for dynamically manipulating images. It can create AVIFs, GIFs, JPEGs, PNGs, WebPs and WBMPs. The images can be composed of lines, arcs, text (using program-selected fonts), other images, and multiple colors, supporting truecolor images, alpha channels, resampling, and many other features.

== History ==
The software was developed in 1994 by Thomas Boutell and others.

GD originally stood for "GIF Draw". However, since the revoking of the Unisys license, it has informally stood for "Graphics Draw".

Support for drawing GIFs was dropped in 1999 when Unisys revoked the royalty-free license granted to non-commercial software projects for the LZW compression method used by GIFs. When the Unisys patent expired worldwide on July 7, 2004, GIF support was subsequently re-enabled.

Version 2.0 added support for truecolor images, alpha channels, resampling (for smooth resizing of truecolor images), and many other features.

== Features ==
The "Fly" command line interpreter allows for image creation ("on the fly") using GD. GD scripts can thus be written in potentially any language and run using this tool.

Its native programming language is ANSI C, but it has interfaces for many other programming languages. GD supports numerous programming languages including C, PHP, Perl, Python, OCaml, Tcl, Lua, Pascal, GNU Octave, Rexx, Ruby and Go. GD is extensively used with PHP, where a modified version supporting additional features is included by default as of PHP 4.3 and was an option before that. As of PHP 5.3, a system version of GD may be used as well, to get the additional features that were previously available only to the bundled version of GD.

== See also ==
- GDAL – Translator library for raster and vector geospatial data formats
- GraphicsMagick – Free and open-source image manipulation software
- ImageMagick – Free and open-source image manipulation software
- Netpbm – Toolkit for manipulation of images
- Python Imaging Library – Library for the Python programming language
