= Stani Michiels =

Stani Michiels is a visual artist, architect, and coin designer who was born in 1973 in Geel (Belgium). He lives and works in the Netherlands (Amsterdam). Michiels has a master's degree in architecture from the Catholic University of Leuven (1991–1996). Afterwards he studied art at the Gerrit Rietveld Academie (1998–2001) and Rijksakademie (2002–2003) in Amsterdam.

In his work architecture is often present. Most of his work is created digitally with self-made software. The final result is a drawing, photo or video, in which the digital origin is not obvious.

Michiels has held exhibitions in the Netherlands, Belgium, France, Germany, Indonesia and China.

Michiels is also a Python programmer, and develops Phatch a photo batch editor based on the Python Imaging Library. He designed an integrated development environment for Python aptly named "Stani's Python Editor".

== Coin design ==
In 2008, Michiels won a competition by the Dutch Finance Ministry to design a special commemorative 5 euro coin with the theme "Netherlands and Architecture". The coin was designed entirely using free software.
