= X-Face =

Bitmap image

X-Face example.

An X-Face is a small bitmap (48 × 48 pixels, black and white) image which is added to a Usenet posting or e-mail message, typically showing a picture of the author's face. The image data is included in the posting as encoded text, and attached with an 'X-Face' header. It was devised by James Ashton.

It is one of the outgrowths of the Vismon program developed at Bell Labs in the 1980s. While many programs support X-Face, most of them are free software and based on Unix or its variations, such as KMail or Sylpheed. The most common email programs though, as used in business and most domestic environments, do not handle X-Face natively, and the information is silently ignored. Even where Unix is widely used (university and research environments), it has never been adopted to maximum potential (for example, by searching for senders by X-Face).

A further development is the Face header developed in 2005, which also allows for color images in PNG format, and can be used by the Thunderbird addon Display Contact Photo, as well as some other mail readers.

Another approach to include the sender's picture in an e-mail was used by Apple: Mail displayed the picture if the mail included the X-Image-URL header. In 1992, this feature was originally implemented in NeXTmail, Mail.app's ancestor. X-Image-URL accepts http or (anonymous) ftp to download the picture; typical size 64x64 pixels. As of Mail v4.5, the feature is no longer supported.

== See also ==
- iChat has a similar though not compatible feature called picture icons
- XBM is a general monochrome image format supported by xbm2xface.pl
- FFmpeg and Netpbm tools can create X-Face images
- Vismon
- Brand Indicators for Message Identification, a similar feature for brands, based on cryptographic authentication
