= VVCap =

Computer program

VVcap
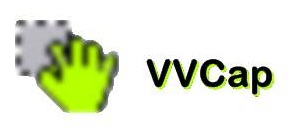
- Developer: G Central
- Initial release: 2010; 15 years ago
- Stable release: 1.6 / December 2010; 15 years ago
- Platform: Windows
- Type: Screenshot
- License: GPL
- Website: www.vvcap.net

VVCap was a screenshot program that operated under the Windows operating system. It was created and distributed by G Central. VVCap was available in English, Spanish and Russian versions, and is supported in those languages.

VVCap replaces the native Print Screen function with additional features, such as: screenshot can be instantly posted to a URL or file, or be placed to a clipboard.

== Features ==
=== Instant Post ===
VVCap allows posting an image to web in minimum amount of clicks, which makes it an ideal tool for sharing messages via instant messaging or Twitter but at this moment, their web servers apparently are down and the website has a 503 HTTP error, for now the clipboard function only works.

=== Security ===
Images stored on the server are being encrypted, and it is not possible to mass-decrypt images by an administrator. Unless presented with URL, that contains file pointer and decryption key, the file itself cannot be decrypted.
