= PicPick =

Freemium screenshot creation and editing software

- Developer: NGWIN
- Stable release: 7.3.4 / 3 March 2025; 20 months ago
- Operating system: Windows
- Size: 14.9 MB
- Available in: 40 languages
- Type: Screenshot, Image viewer
- License: Freemium
- Website: picpick.app

PicPick is a Windows program used for creating and editing screenshots. After installation, it resides in the taskbar where all its functions can be accessed via the context menu. It can either be installed or can be run as a portable app.

== License ==
PicPick is free for private use. Commercial users must purchase a license.

The free version requires manual update and provides no technical support.

== Functions ==
=== Creation of screenshots ===
The creation of screenshots is possible in two ways:

- Press the Print Screen button to automatically take a screenshot of the desktop or, in conjunction with the Alt key, the current window in PicPick opens.
- Using the taskbar context menu multiple screenshot variations are possible. A scrolling window selection method can be used. This enables, for example, the capture of a full web page to a single screenshot.

=== Screen recording ===
As of the version 7.0.0. PicPick introduced the screen recorder menu along with various ways of image capture. This option gives 2 ways of screen recording - the full screen and the region. The records can be saved both in MP4 as well as GIF format.

=== Image editing ===
In addition to the ability to take a screenshot, PicPick also provides basic editing functions.

Recent versions also allow the sharing of images via Facebook and Twitter, Email, Skype amongst others.

=== Supported formats ===
Supported formats .bmp, .gif, .jpg, .png, .pdf. gif, .mp4

== Downloads ==
Via cnet alone it had almost 2 million downloads.

== See also ==
- Screenshot software
