= Jef Poskanzer =

Computer programmer

Jeffrey A. Poskanzer
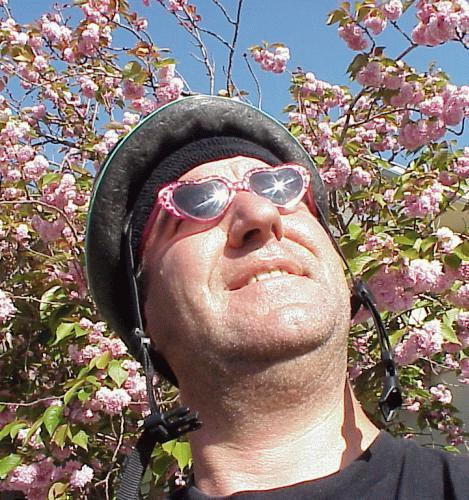
- Occupation: computer programmer
- Known for: pbmplus

Jeffrey A. Poskanzer is a computer programmer. He was the first person to post a weekly FAQ to Usenet. He developed the portable pixmap file format and pbmplus (the precursor to the Netpbm package) to manipulate it. He has also worked on the team that ported A/UX. He has shared in two USENIX Lifetime Achievement Awards – in 1993 for Berkeley Unix, and in 1996 for the Software Tools Project.

He owns the Internet domain name acme.com (which is notable for receiving over one million e-mail spams a day), which is the home page for ACME Laboratories. It hosts a number of open source software projects; major projects maintained include both pbmplus and thttpd, an open source web server.
