= Snagit =

Screen capture and screen recording software

- Snagit

- Snagit Capture (Windows icon only)
- Developer: TechSmith
- Initial release: 1990

Stable release(s)
- Windows: 2026.0.0 (14 January 2026)
- Mac: 2026.0.0 (16 December 2025)
- Operating system: Windows, macOS
- Type: Screen capture and screen recording
- License: Proprietary software
- Website: www.techsmith.com/screen-capture.html

Snagit (formerly SnagIt) is screen capture and screen recording software for Windows and macOS. It is created and developed by TechSmith and was first launched in 1990. Snagit is available in English, French, German, Japanese, Portuguese and Spanish versions.

Snagit replaces the native print screen function and extends it with additional features.

== Features ==
The features are structured around the three main steps of the software workflow: capture, edit and share.

=== Capture ===
Snagit Capture allows the user to capture an image or record a video. There are various capture methods, including fullscreen selection, specific region selection, menu selection, text recognition (OCR with Grab text) and panoramic selection. Alternatively, the software can record a video (from a specific region or fullscreen).

Hotkeys (Windows) and shortcuts (Mac) are available to speed up the capture process.

The Snagit Capture file (.snagx) is a cross-platform compatible file format used to store image captures both on Windows and Mac. Snagit 2021 and earlier versions stored image captures in .snag (Windows) and .snagproj (Mac) formats; the two formats were not compatible.

Videos recordings are stored in .mp4 format.

=== Edit ===
Using Snagit Editor, a captured image can be resized, annotated with arrows and callouts, or given other effects such as borders. Another feature is to create a video from the captured images (narrating a set of screenshots).

The software also allows the creation of tutorials (using the Step tool and/or using the Simplify tool, which allows you to create Simplified User Interfaces). There are also confidentiality features (blurring areas, cropping images). Video editing is limited to basic features such as trimming.

=== Share ===
The resulting image or video can be shared as a local file (supported formats include PNG, JPEG, HEIF, WebP and MP4), to another application (Microsoft Outlook, Apple Mail, Camtasia) or uploaded online (YouTube, Google Drive, FTP).

Although most of the main features are identical between the Windows and Mac versions of the software, some effects are specific to one version (e.g.the watermark effect is only available on Windows and the reflection effect only on Mac).

== TechSmith Fuse (Android and iOS) ==
Snagit can connect through Wi-Fi to the TechSmith Fuse app. Images, videos and screen recordings stored on mobile devices can be sent directly to the Snagit file library.

== See also ==
- Snipping Tool, Microsoft Windows official screenshot capture tool
- Screenshot app, Apple MacOS official screenshot capture tool
- Comparison of screencasting software
- Presentation slide
- Technical writing
