= Greenshot =

Screenshot capture software

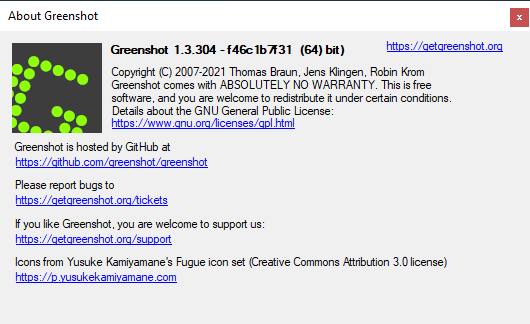
- Greenshot 1.3.304 running on Windows 10 22H2
- Developers: Thomas Braun, Jens Klingen, Robin Krom
- Release: 2007; 19 years ago
- Stable release: 1.3.315 / March 20, 2026; 6 months ago
- Preview release: 1.3.277 / March 27, 2023; 3 years ago
- Written in: C#
- Operating system: Windows, macOS
- Platform: IA-32, x86-64
- Size: 4.04 MB
- Available in: 33 languages: English, Arabic, Brazilian Portuguese, Chinese (Traditional and Simplified), Czech, Danish, Dutch, Estonian, Finnish, French, German, Greek, Hebrew, Hungarian, Indonesian, Italian, Japanese, Korean, Lithuanian, Norwegian, Persian, Polish, Portuguese, Romanian, Russian, Serbian, Slovak, Spanish, Swedish, Turkish, Ukrainian, Vietnamese
- Type: Screenshot
- License: GNU General Public License (Windows); Proprietary (macOS)
- Website: getgreenshot.org
- Repository: github.com/greenshot/greenshot

Greenshot is a free and open-source screenshot program for Microsoft Windows. It is developed by Thomas Braun, Jens Klingen and Robin Krom and is published under GNU General Public License, hosted by GitHub. Greenshot is also available for macOS, but as proprietary software through the App Store.

Greenshot's feature set mainly targets project managers, testers and developers. It is used to create full or partial screenshots. The captured screenshot can be annotated and edited using the built-in image editor before exporting it either to an image file, email attachment, printer or clipboard.

By March 2012, Greenshot was available in 33 languages; most of the translations have been contributed by users.

== Features ==
=== Screenshots ===
Greenshot offers several modes for creating a screenshot: "Capture region" allows to select an area of the screen by dragging a green rectangle to the desired position and size. "Capture last region" is used to re-capture exactly the same area that was captured before. "Capture window" creates a screenshot of the active or a selected window (depending on the user's settings). "Capture fullscreen" captures the complete screen(s). "Capture Internet Explorer" allows creating a scrolling capture of websites that are larger than the browser window when opened in Internet Explorer.

=== Image editor ===
If the user needs to add annotations, highlightings or obfuscations to the screenshot the built-in image editor can be used. Greenshot's image editor is a basic vector graphics editor; however, it offers some pixel-based filters. It allows to draw basic shapes (rectangles, ellipses, lines, arrows and freehand) and add text to a screenshot. Special filter tools are present to highlight text or an area, as well as obfuscating tools (blur / pixelize) which can be used to wipe out sensitive data from a screenshot. Each tool comes with its set of settings, e.g. line color and thickness or an option to drop a shadow.

=== Export for further use ===
Using the image editor is optional, all export options are available from its top toolbar and menu. However the user can configure Greenshot to skip this step and pass the screenshot to other destinations directly. Options are copying the image to the clipboard as Bitmap, sending it to a printer, saving it to the file system (using a user-defined pattern for the filename) or attaching it to a new e-mail message. Since version 1.0 a destination picker is available to select the export destination dynamically after every screenshot, along with several plugins for specialized export to third-party applications (e.g. Microsoft Office programs, Paint.NET) and platforms (e.g. Dropbox, JIRA).

=== Downloads ===
By July 2014 the program has been downloaded over 5 million times from SourceForge and almost 2 million downloads were counted in 2013. As of July 2014, the CNET download page counted a total of more than 110,000 downloads. In addition, Greenshot is available for download at other software portals like Softpedia and Softonic.com.

== Reviews ==
CNET.com staff has rated version 1.0 of Greenshot 5 of 5 stars, highlighting the possibility to select destinations dynamically and the "surprisingly sophisticated" image editor. Techworld.com concludes that "there are more powerful screen capture tools around" but still gave 4 of 5 stars for Greenshot's "general ease of use". Nick Mead of Softonic also emphasizes the program's easiness as well as the possibilities for annotation and configuration, but criticizes unneeded visual effects when doing the screen capture, rating Greenshot 7 of 10.
