= Lightscreen =

Screen shooting application for Microsoft Windows

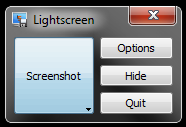
- Developer: Christian Kaiser
- Stable release: 2.0 / 15 April 2014; 11 years ago
- Written in: C++
- Operating system: Windows 9x, Windows NT, Windows 2000 and Windows XP
- Platform: Qt
- Available in: English, Chinese (Simplified), Dutch, French, German, Italian, Japanese, Polish, Portuguese, Romanian, Russian, Slovenian and Spanish
- Type: Screenshooting software
- License: GNU General Public License
- Website: lightscreen.com.ar

Lightscreen is a lightweight screen shooting application for Microsoft Windows, used to automate the process of saving and cataloging screenshots. It operates as a hidden background process that is invoked with one (or multiple) hotkeys and then saves a screenshot file to disk according to the user's preferences. It has no built-in editing or annotation tools. Lightscreen has features to set a delay time and save screenshots in multiple image formats. A portable version is available

Current Website: https://lightscreen.com.ar/ As of August 20, 2020, Lightscreen is at Version 2.4 and the download is hosted on GitHub. It no longer appears to be using Sourceforge.net which is still hosting version 1.01 and was last updated 2014-04-15.

== See also ==
- Screenshot
