= X PixMap =

Image file format

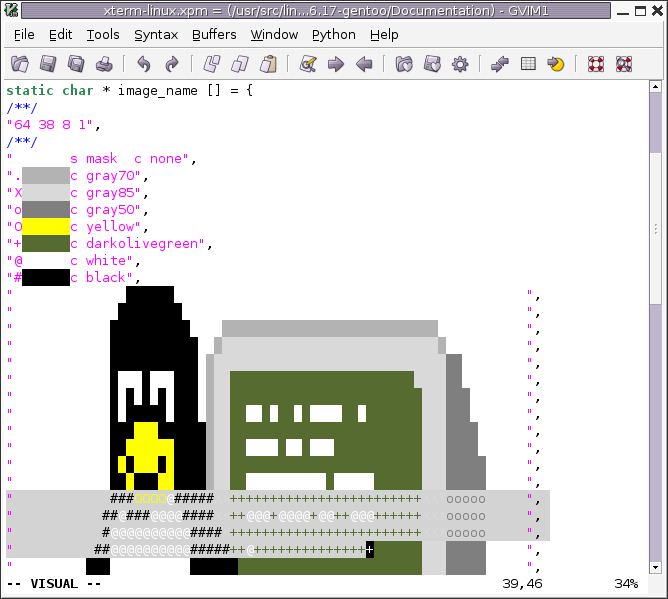
- Some text editors, for example gvim, can display xpm images in graphical form.
- Filename extension: .xpm
- Internet media type: image/x-xpixmap
- Developed by: BULL Research
- Type of format: Image file formats
- Extended from: XBM
- Open format?: yes

X PixMap (XPM) is an image file format used by the X Window System, created in 1989 by Daniel Dardailler and Colas Nahaboo working at Bull Research Center at Sophia Antipolis, France, and later enhanced by Arnaud Le Hors.

It is intended primarily for creating icon pixmaps, and supports transparent pixels. Derived from the earlier XBM syntax, it is a plain text file in the XPM2 format or of a C programming language syntax, which can be included in a C program file.

== History ==
=== XPM1 ===
The first (1989) XPM format is relatively similar to the XBM format. (Note: For a description of this format in lieu of the manual (not found on the Internet), use xpm-contrib (formerly part of libXpm proper) converter (xpm2ppm, xpm1to3, xpm1to2c) source code.) Compared to XBM, it uses additional macro definitions and variables for indexed colors, and replaces bits with characters for describing the image. The following is a black-and-white image in the 1989 XPM format.

#define XFACE_format 1
#define XFACE_width 48
#define XFACE_height 48
#define XFACE_ncolors 2
#define XFACE_chars_per_pixel 1
static char *XFACE_colors[] = {
"a", "#ffffff",
"b", "#000000"
};
static char *XFACE_pixels[] = {
"abaabaababaaabaabababaabaabaababaabaaababaabaaab",
// and so on for 48 rows with 48 pixels

=== XPM2 ===
XPM2 (1990) simplifies the format by removing all C code. (Note: It is also acceptable to use programming language syntaxes for string arrays, but only the C syntax is attested. The "XPM2 C" syntax eventually became the only format in XPM version 3.) (Note: For references on this syntax, see https://gitlab.freedesktop.org/xorg/lib/libxpm/-/blob/master/NEWS.old and the "history" section of libXpm 3.4 manual.) The structure is simplified to

! XPM2
<Values>
<Colors>
<Pixels>
<Optional Extensions>

- The value section describes the overall dimension of the image similar to the #define statements.
- The color section defines the values, and a new concept of the "type" of the color. The types may be c for "color", m for "monochrome" output, g for "grayscale", and s for "symbolic", explaining what a defined color is supposed to do.
- The pixels and optional extensions remain as in the original format.

The above file, with width 48, height 4, 2 colors, and 1 character per pixel, becomes:

! XPM2
48 4 2 1
a c #FFFFFF
b c #000000
abaabaababaaabaabababaabaabaababaabaaababaabaaab
abaabaababaaabaabababaabaabaababaabaaababaabaaab
abaabaababaaabaabababaabaabaababaabaaababaabaaab
abaabaababaaabaabababaabaabaababaabaaababaabaaab

==== Colors ====
In addition to hexcodes, the colors can be any of the X11 color names. In addition, None indicates transparency.

The "symbolic" feature permits adjusting colors depending on the context where they are used. Code such as s border c blue could be adjusted on a blue background.

==== Many-color encoding ====
One tool is known to use only a to p for 16 colors, switching to aa up to dp for 64 colors, but still reading single character encodings for 64 colors; compare Base64.

With more colors the codes use more characters, e.g. aa up to pp for 16 × 16 = 256 colors. This is less useful for text editors, because a string ab could be actually the middle of two adjacent pixels dabc. Spaces are allowed as color code, but might be a bad idea depending on the used text editor. Without control codes, backslash, and quote (needed in XPM1 and XPM3) 128 − 33 − 2 = 93 ASCII characters are available for single character color codes.

Simplified example: 90 US-ASCII characters could be arranged into nine non-overlapping sets of 10 characters. Thus unambiguous strings of nine characters could set the color of each pixel by its XPM palette index with up to 10^{9} = 1000000000 colors (compare to GIF, which supports only 256).

For XPM2 it is clear how many lines belong to the image – two header lines, the second header line announcing the number of color codes (2 lines in the example above) and rows (height 4 in the example above), e.g. 2 + 2 + 4 = 8 lines.

=== XPM3 ===
The current and last format is XPM3 (1991). It re-introduces the C wrapper, but instead of explicitly showing a file's structure, the strings stored are essentially identical to XPM2.

/* XPM */
static char * XFACE[] = {
"48 4 2 1",
"a c #ffffff",
"b c #000000",
"abaabaababaaabaabababaabaabaababaabaaababaabaaab",
"abaabaababaaabaabababaabaabaababaabaaababaabaaab",
"abaabaababaaabaabababaabaabaababaabaaababaabaaab",
"abaabaababaaabaabababaabaabaababaabaaababaabaaab"
};

If the "values" line contains six instead of four numbers, the additional values indicate the coordinates of a "hotspot", where 0 0 is the upper left corner of a box containing the icon and the default. A "hotspot" is used for mouse pointers and similar applications.

== Comparison with other formats ==
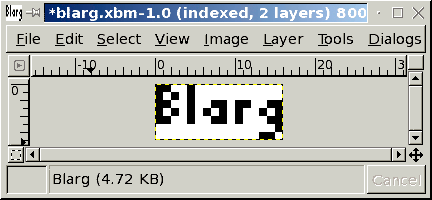
Blarg file opened in program window

The following code displays the same blarg file in the XBM, XPM and PBM formats.

XBM version:

#define test_width 16
#define test_height 7
static char test_bits[] = {
0x13, 0x00, 0x15, 0x00, 0x93, 0xcd, 0x55, 0xa5, 0x93, 0xc5, 0x00, 0x80,
0x00, 0x60 };

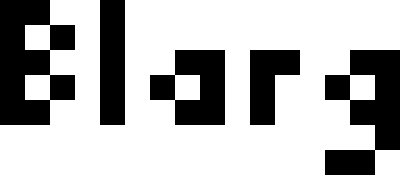
Blarg.xpm (XPM2) rendered by XnView

XPM2 version:

! XPM2
16 7 2 1
* c #000000
. c #ffffff
**..*...........
*.*.*...........
**..*..**.**..**
*.*.*.*.*.*..*.*
**..*..**.*...**
...............*
.............**.

XPM3 version:

/* XPM */
static char * blarg_xpm[] = {
"16 7 2 1",
"* c #000000",
". c #ffffff",
"**..*...........",
"*.*.*...........",
"**..*..**.**..**",
"*.*.*.*.*.*..*.*",
"**..*..**.*...**",
"...............*",
".............**."
};

PBM file:

P1
16 7
1 1 0 0 1 0 0 0 0 0 0 0 0 0 0 0
1 0 1 0 1 0 0 0 0 0 0 0 0 0 0 0
1 1 0 0 1 0 0 1 1 0 1 1 0 0 1 1
1 0 1 0 1 0 1 0 1 0 1 0 0 1 0 1
1 1 0 0 1 0 0 1 1 0 1 0 0 0 1 1
0 0 0 0 0 0 0 0 0 0 0 0 0 0 0 1
0 0 0 0 0 0 0 0 0 0 0 0 0 1 1 0

== Application support ==
ACDSee, Amaya, CorelDRAW, GIMP, ImageMagick, IrfanView (formats plugin), PaintShop Pro, PMView, Photoshop (plugins), and XnView among others support XPM. Gravatar also supports XPM.

An X11 libXpm vulnerability was fixed in 2005, and three more in 2023.

FFmpeg version 3.3 or later can decode XPM.

== See also ==
- Netpbm – Toolkit for manipulation of images
- CLUT – In computer graphics, a finite set of available colors
- X BitMap – File format

== See also ==
- X Window System (X11) and X11 color names
- PBM (mono), PGM (grayscale), PPM (color), PNM (any)
- X BitMap
