= Vismon =

Vismon was the Bell Labs system which displayed authors' faces on one of their internal e-mail systems. The name was a pun on the sysmon program used at Bell to show the load on computer systems. It can also be interpreted as "visual monitor". The system inspired Rich Burridge to develop the similar but more widespread faces system, which spread with Unix distributions in the 1980s. This in turn inspired Steve Kinzler to develop the Picons, or personal icons, which have the goal of offering symbols and other images, as well as faces, to represent individuals and institutions in email messages. Other systems such as the faces available on the LAN email functions of the NeXTSTEP platform also seem to have been influenced by the original Vismon capabilities. The faces program in Plan 9 is the direct descendant of this system.

Vismon was the work of Rob Pike and Dave Presotto. It was based on some early experiments by Luca Cardelli. Many other scientists and engineers of the Computing Science Research Center of the Murray Hill facility were also involved. All had been spurred by the introduction in 1983 of the new Blit graphics terminal developed by Pike and Bart N. Locanthi and marketed by Teletype Corporation of Skokie, Illinois as the DMD 5620. Pike was eager, along with his colleagues, to exploit the new graphics capabilities.

Pike and company went around their Center, convincing everybody, from directors and administrative assistants to engineers and scientists, to pose as they got out a 4×5 view camera with a Polaroid back and took black-and-white photos (Polaroid type 52) of their faces. Their efforts yielded nearly 100 faces, which they digitised with a scanner from graphics colleagues. They wrote several programs to transform the faces, store them and serve them on several machines at the lab. As time went by, they added faces from outside their Center and outside Bell Labs. This database also led to the pico image editor (originally named zunk) which was used for image transformations, many of them with colleagues as the preferred target.

The first programs built around vismon were used to announce incoming mail in a dedicated window, using the 48 by 48 pixel faces. Later on, the faces were also used to decorate line printer banners.

== See also ==
- X-Face

== Notes ==
- Pike, Rob and Presotto, Dave. "Face the Nation". USENIX Summer 1985 Conference Proceedings. Portland, Oregon 1985.
- Holzmann, Gerard. "Beyond Photography - the digital darkroom". Prentice Hall, 1987.
