= Luca Cardelli =

Italian computer scientist

Luca Cardelli FRS
- Luca Cardelli in 2026
- Born: Luca Andrea Cardelli; Montecatini Terme, Italy
- Education: University of Pisa; University of Edinburgh (PhD)
- Known for: Theory of Objects
- Awards: Dahl–Nygaard Prize (2007); ACM Fellow (2005)
- Scientific career
- Fields: Theory of programming languages Process algebra Systems biology Molecular Programming
- Workplaces: Bell Labs; Microsoft Research; Digital Equipment Corporation; University of Edinburgh; University of Oxford
- Thesis: An algebraic approach to hardware description and verification (1982)
- Doctoral advisor: Gordon Plotkin
- Website: lucacardelli.name

Luca Andrea Cardelli FRS is an Italian computer scientist who is a research professor at the University of Oxford, UK. Cardelli is well known for his research in type theory and operational semantics. Among other contributions, in programming languages, he helped design the language Modula-3, implemented the first compiler for the (non-pure) functional language ML, defined the concept of typeful programming, and helped develop the experimental language Polyphonic C#.

== Education ==
He was born in Montecatini Terme, Italy. He attended the University of Pisa before receiving his PhD from the University of Edinburgh in 1982 for research supervised by Gordon Plotkin.

== Career and research ==
Before joining the University of Oxford in 2014, and Microsoft Research in Cambridge, UK in 1997, he worked for Bell Labs and Digital Equipment Corporation, and contributed to Unix software including vismon.

=== Awards and honours ===
In 2004 he was inducted as a Fellow of the Association for Computing Machinery. He was elected a Fellow of the Royal Society (FRS) in 2005. In 2007, Cardelli was awarded the Senior AITO Dahl–Nygaard Prize named for Ole-Johan Dahl and Kristen Nygaard.

== Trivia ==
Cardelli created and published the Dijkstra font, a computer typeface mimicking Edsger W. Dijkstra's handwriting, in the late 1980s while working at DEC.
