= GNOME Screenshot =

Utility used in the GNOME desktop environment for taking screenshots

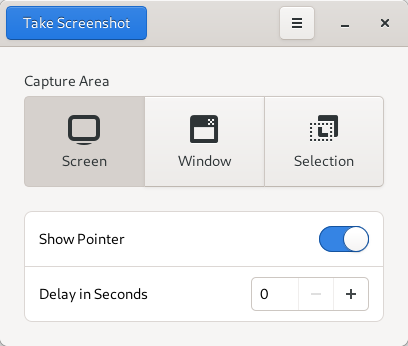
- GNOME Screenshot 3.38
- Developer: GNOME Project
- Final release: 41.0 / 14 November 2021; 4 years ago
- Written in: C
- Operating system: Unix-like
- Platform: GTK
- Type: Screenshot software
- License: GPL-2.0-or-later
- Website: gitlab.gnome.org/GNOME/gnome-screenshot
- Repository: gitlab.gnome.org/GNOME/gnome-screenshot.git

GNOME Screenshot is a desktop environment-agnostic utility for taking screenshots. It was formerly the default screenshot tool in the GNOME desktop environment but is no longer being actively developed for that purpose. It was originally part of the GNOME Utilities (gnome-utils) package but was split into its own package for the 3.3.1 version in 2011. It remained the default screenshot software in GNOME until it was replaced by a built-in utility in GNOME Shell version 42 in 2022.

== Features ==
The application allows users to capture the whole screen, a specific window, or a user-selected rectangular area. It provides several options including:

- A time delay function (allowing users to set a timer before the screenshot is taken, useful for capturing menus or context actions).
- The ability to include or exclude the mouse pointer.
- Image effects, such as adding a drop shadow or a border to the screenshot.

Captured images can be saved as files (defaulting to the Pictures/Screenshots folder) or copied directly to the clipboard.

=== Keyboard shortcuts ===
While the application provides a graphical user interface (GUI), its functions are also bound to keyboard shortcuts in many Linux distributions using GNOME (prior to version 42) or similar desktop environments:

- PrtSc captures the whole screen.
- Alt+PrtSc captures the currently focused window.
- ⇧ Shift+PrtSc captures a selected area of the screen.
- Adding Ctrl to any of the above shortcuts copies the image to the clipboard instead of saving it to a file.

== Replacement ==
In GNOME 42, the standalone GNOME Screenshot application was replaced by a new built-in screenshot UI within GNOME Shell. This new native tool combines screenshot capabilities with a screen recording (screencast) feature, using an interactive overlay.

== See also ==
- Spectacle – The screenshot utility for KDE
- scrot
- Shutter
