= Berend Strik =

Dutch visual artist (born 1960)

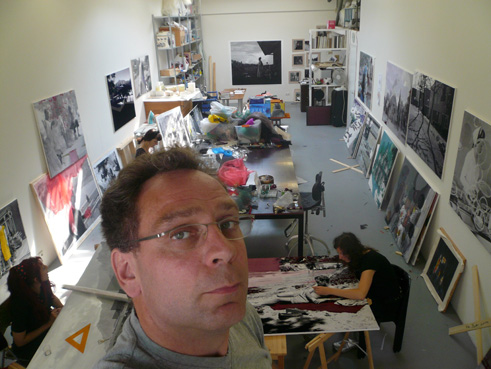
Strik in his studio in 2007

Berend Strik (born 26 April 1960) is a Dutch visual artist working and living in Amsterdam.
