= Snipping Tool =

Microsoft Windows screenshot utility

- Snipping Tool in Windows 11
- Developer: Microsoft
- Initial release: November 7, 2002; 23 years ago

Stable release(s) [±]
- Windows 11: November 2025 Update (11.2511.31.0) / 15 January 2026; 4 months ago
- Windows 10: August 2020 Update (10.2008.3001.0) / 2 April 2025; 14 months ago
- Operating system: Windows XP Tablet PC Edition (Experience pack); Windows Vista; Windows Server 2008; Windows 7 (excluding Home Basic and Starter editions); Windows Server 2008 R2; Windows Home Server 2011; Windows 8.x; Windows Server 2012; Windows Server 2012 R2; Windows 10; Windows Server 2016; Windows Server 2019; Windows 11
- Type: Screenshot and screencast software
- Website: support.microsoft.com/en-us/windows/open-snipping-tool-and-take-a-screenshot-a35ac9ff-4a58-24c9-3253-f12bac9f9d44

Snipping Tool is a Microsoft Windows screenshot and screencast utility included in Windows Vista and later. It can take still screenshots or record videos of an open window, rectangular areas, a free-form area, or the entire screen. Snips can then be annotated using a mouse or a tablet, stored as an image file (PNG, GIF, or JPEG file) or an MHTML file, or e-mailed. The Snipping Tool allows for basic image editing of the snapshot, with different colored pens, an eraser, and a highlighter.

== History ==
The Snipping Tool was originally released as a PowerToy for the Microsoft Tablet PC and included in the Experience Pack for Windows XP Tablet PC Edition.

It was developed by the Leszynski Group and lead developer Kollen Glynn. During development it was called Snippet, the name was changed to the Snipping Tool just before it was released. Microsoft was looking to develop a utility that showed the power of the stylus specifically via the free-form, non-rectangular screen capture. This free-form screen capture was demonstrated by Bill Gates on stage with actor Rob Lowe as part of the launch event for the Tablet PC on November 7, 2002.

Before Windows Vista, the tool would only run on the Windows XP Tablet PC Edition. From Windows Vista onwards, the tool was included in the main Windows code base without the Tablet PC-only restriction.

In Windows 10 version 1809, a new Universal app version of Snipping Tool known as Snip & Sketch was introduced. It was first named Screen Sketch, and was initially a component of the Windows Ink Workspace. Snipping Tool was modified to contain a notice warning of the application's deprecation, which encouraged users to move to Snip & Sketch. Despite this, the app was never removed from Windows 10.

In April 2021, Microsoft released Windows 10 Insider build 21354, which made the Snipping Tool updateable from the Microsoft Store by being packaged with Snip & Sketch.

Windows 11 insider build 22000.132, released on August 12, 2021, introduced an update to Snip & Sketch that renames it to Snipping Tool and ports it to WinUI 3.0 and brings an interface closer to the legacy Snipping Tool. The legacy snipping tool was removed with this build. Since the update on November 07, 2025, Snipping Tool has a screen recording function.

== See also ==
- Features new to Windows Vista
