= Monosnap =

Screenshot program

- Developer: Monosnap
- Initial release: 11 July 2012; 13 years ago
- Stable release: 2.0.9 (2.3.20 for Windows) / 22 January 2014; 11 years ago
- Written in: Objective-C; C#
- Operating system: Windows XP or later Mac OS X 10.7 or later
- Platform: Intel x86 – 32-bit; .NET Framework 3.0 with Service Pack 1 (Windows version); x64 (Mac OS X version)
- Size: 5 MB (Mac OS X Version); 7.5 MB (Windows version)
- Available in: Fully translated: English, Russian
- Type: Utility software
- License: freemium Requires registration
- Website: monosnap.ai

Monosnap is a screenshot program for Mac OS X and Windows. The program allows users to create screenshots, annotate them and upload them to the cloud. It was released for Mac OS X on 11 July 2012. Several days after it was positively reviewed by sites like Addictive Tips, freetech4teachers, OneDayOneApp and MakeUseOf, an update was released on 5 August 2012, providing authorization with email. On 10 August there was a release for Windows, providing similar functionality.

Since 9 October 2012 (version 1.4.0) app allows to upload images to FTP, SFTP or WebDAV servers. Right now it also has in-app turning on external services support (Dropbox, Evernote, Box.com, CloudApp).

== Characteristics ==
=== Captures ===
Monosnap has two capture modes: the first captures the entire screen (or screens). The second mode captures an area or window of the screen. In the latter mode, a magnifying glass appears, showing the size of the selected rectangle and the pixel color under the cursor.

=== Image editor ===
After taking a screenshot, Monosnap opens its editor with tools like a pen, line, rectangle, oval, arrow, text, and blur. It also has a tool to remove unnecessary details if they weren't removed while capturing a screenshot.

=== After the capture ===
There are several options to proceed with screenshot, available from settings:

- Open Monosnap Editor – selected by default.
- Save Capture – saves the image to the default folder or opens a dialog.
- Upload – Instantly upload to the cloud or FTP/SFTP/WebDAV server.
- Open external editor – opens the image in any installed program capable of working with PNG format. This option is only available on Mac.
- Drag-and-drop feature: From the Monosnap image editor, you can drag and drop images into other programs.

=== Cloud storage ===
Using cloud storage requires registration with Facebook or email. All uploads can be accessed via the web, and images can be sorted into folders. There is currently no limit on cloud storage.

However, there appears to be a limit on the traffic generated by accessing uploads, and the user can be banned afterward.
