= Bitmap =

Computing term

In computing, a bitmap (also called raster) graphic is an image formed from a grid of pixels, each assigned a color value. A GIF is an example of a graphics image file that uses a bitmap.

As a noun, the term "bitmap" is very often used to refer to a particular bitmapping application: the pix-map, which refers to a map of pixels, where each pixel may use more than one bit, allowing it to represent more than two colors, thus using more than one bit per pixel. In such a case, the domain in question is the array of pixels which constitute a digital graphic output device (a screen or monitor). In some contexts, the term bitmap implies one bit per pixel, whereas pixmap is used for images with multiple bits per pixel.

A bitmap is a type of memory organization or image file format used to store digital images. The term bitmap comes from the computer programming terminology, meaning just a map of bits, a spatially mapped array of bits. Now, along with pixmap, it commonly refers to the similar concept of a spatially mapped array of pixels. Raster images in general may be referred to as bitmaps or pixmaps, whether synthetic or photographic, in files or memory.

Many graphical user interfaces use bitmaps in their built-in graphics subsystems. For example, the Microsoft Windows and OS/2 platforms' GDI subsystem uses the Windows and OS/2 bitmap file format, usually named with the file extension .BMP (or .DIB for device-independent bitmap). Besides BMP, other file formats that store literal bitmaps include InterLeaved Bitmap (ILBM), Portable Bitmap (PBM), X Bitmap (XBM), and Wireless Application Protocol Bitmap (WBMP). Similarly, most other image file formats, such as JPEG, TIFF, PNG, and GIF, also store bitmap images (as opposed to vector graphics), but they are not usually referred to as bitmaps, it's mostly a matter of convention rather than any technical distinction.

== Pixel storage ==
In typical uncompressed bitmaps, image pixels are generally stored with a variable number of bits per pixel which identify its color (the color depth). Pixels of 8 bits and fewer can represent either grayscale or indexed color. An alpha channel (for transparency) may be stored in a separate bitmap, where it is similar to a grayscale bitmap, or in a fourth channel that, for example, converts 24-bit images to 32 bits per pixel.

The bits representing the bitmap pixels may be packed or unpacked (spaced out to byte or word boundaries), depending on the format or device requirements. Depending on the color depth, a pixel in the picture will occupy at least n/8 bytes, where n is the bit depth.

For an uncompressed, packed-within-rows bitmap, such as is stored in Microsoft DIB or BMP file format, or in uncompressed TIFF format, a lower bound on storage size for a n-bit-per-pixel (2^{n} colors) bitmap, in bytes, can be calculated as:

$$\text{size} = \text{width} \cdot \text{height} \cdot n/8$$

where width and height are given in pixels.

In the formula above, header size and color palette size, if any, are not included. Due to effects of row padding to align each row start to a storage unit boundary, such as a word, additional bytes may be needed.

== Device-independent bitmaps and BMP file format ==
Microsoft has defined a particular representation of color bitmaps of different color depths, as an aid to exchanging bitmaps between devices and applications with a variety of internal representations. They called these device-independent bitmaps "DIBs", and the file format for them is called DIB file format or BMP file format. According to Microsoft support:

A device-independent bitmap (DIB) is a format used to define device-independent bitmaps in various color resolutions. The main purpose of DIBs is to allow bitmaps to be moved from one device to another (hence, the device-independent part of the name). A DIB is an external format, in contrast to a device-dependent bitmap, which appears in the system as a bitmap object (created by an application...). A DIB is normally transported in metafiles (usually using the StretchDIBits() function), BMP files, and the Clipboard (CF_DIB data format).

Here, "device independent" refers to the format, or storage arrangement, and should not be confused with device-independent color.

=== Other bitmap file formats ===
The X Window System uses a similar XBM format for black-and-white images, and XPM (pixelmap) for color images. Numerous other uncompressed bitmap file formats are in use, though most not widely. For most purposes, standardized compressed bitmap files such as GIF, PNG, TIFF, and JPEG are used. Lossless compression in particular provides the same information as a bitmap in a smaller file size. TIFF and JPEG have various options. JPEG is usually lossy compression. TIFF is usually either uncompressed, or lossless Lempel–Ziv–Welch compressed like GIF. PNG uses deflate lossless compression, another Lempel-Ziv variant.

There are also a variety of "raw" image files, which store raw bitmaps with no other information. Such raw files are just bitmaps in files, often with no header or size information (they are distinct from photographic raw image formats, which store raw unprocessed sensor data in a structured container such as TIFF format along with extensive image metadata).

== See also ==
- Free space bitmap, an array of bits that tracks which disk storage blocks are in-use
- Raster graphics
- Raster scan
- Rasterization
- Sprite (computer graphics)
- Voxels
- Vector graphics
- Image tracing
