= Python Imaging Library =

Library for the Python programming language

- Original author: Fredrik Lundh
- Developer: Secret Labs AB
- Release: 1995; 31 years ago
- Stable release: 1.1.7 / November 15, 2009; 16 years ago
- Preview release: 1.2a0 / 2011; 15 years ago
- Written in: Python, C
- Type: Library for image processing
- License: MIT-CMU
- Website: python-pillow.github.io

Pillow
- Original author: Jeffrey A. Clark (Alex)
- Release: 31 July 2010; 16 years ago
- Stable release: 12.2.0 / April 1, 2026; 7 months ago
- Written in: Python, C
- Type: Library for image processing
- License: MIT-CMU
- Website: python-pillow.github.io

Python Imaging Library is a free and open-source additional library for the Python programming language that adds support for opening, manipulating, and saving many different image file formats. It is available for Windows, macOS and Linux. The latest version of PIL is 1.1.7, was released in September 2009 and supports Python 1.5.2–2.7.

Development of the original project, known as PIL, was discontinued in 2011. Subsequently, a successor project named Pillow forked the PIL repository and added Python 3.x support. This fork has been adopted as a replacement for the original PIL in Linux distributions including Debian and Ubuntu (since 13.04).

== Capabilities ==
PIL offers several standard procedures for image manipulation. These include:

- per-pixel manipulations,
- masking and transparency handling,
- image filtering, such as blurring, contouring, smoothing, or edge finding,
- image enhancing, such as sharpening, adjusting brightness, contrast or color,
- adding text

== File formats ==
Supported file formats include PPM, PNG, JPEG, GIF, TIFF, and BMP. PIL is extensible, allowing users to create custom decoders for any file format.

== Programming examples ==
import os
from PIL import Image


def convert_jpegs_to_pngs(folder_path):
    # Checks if the provided path is a folder
    if not os.path.isdir(folder_path):
        print(f"Error: {folder_path} is not a valid folder.")
        return

    # Iterates over all files in the folder
    for filename in os.listdir(folder_path):
        # Checks if the file has a .jpg or .jpeg extension
        if filename.lower().endswith(".jpg") or filename.lower().endswith(".jpeg"):
            # Full path of the file
            jpeg_path = os.path.join(folder_path, filename)
            # Path for the converted file
            png_path = os.path.join(folder_path, os.path.splitext(filename)[0] + ".png")

            try:
                # Opens the JPEG image
                with Image.open(jpeg_path) as img:
                    # Converts and saves as PNG
                    img.save(png_path, "PNG")
                    print(f"Converted {jpeg_path} to {png_path}")
            except Exception as e:
                print(f"Error converting {jpeg_path}: {e}")
