= Jing (software) =

Retired screen sharing software

- Developer: TechSmith
- Release: 28 November 2007; 18 years ago
- Final release: 2.9.15255 (Windows) 2.7.0 (Mac) / 12 September 2015; 11 years ago
- Written in: C++, C# & .NET (Windows)
- Operating system: Windows XP or later Mac OS X 10.6.8 or later
- Platform: Intel x86 - 32-bit; .NET Framework 3.5 with Service Pack 1 (Windows version); QuickTime 7.5.5 (Mac OS X version)
- Size: 6.5 MB (approximately)
- Type: Screencast
- License: Jing: freeware (retired); Jing Pro: shareware Requires registration
- Website: www.techsmith.com/jing-tool.html

Jing was a screencasting computer program released in November 2007 as Jing Project by the TechSmith Corporation. Users must create an account before they can use the software, which must be installed on their computer. Its simple format and the ability to upload captures instantly have made Jing useful in virtual library references.

The software took a picture or video of the user's computer screen and uploaded it to the Web, FTP, computer or clipboard. If uploaded to the web, the program automatically created a URL to the content so it could be shared with others.

== Jing Pro ==
=== Releasement ===
On 6 January 2009, TechSmith released Jing Pro, which is a paid premium version of Jing. Unlike the free version, the professional version supports MPEG-4 saving, watermarks at the beginning and end of the video is not included, uploading to YouTube and working with cameras.

=== Retirement ===
In February 2012, Techsmith announced Jing Pro is to be retired. All users (regardless of subscription) could use this service until 28 February 2013.

== End of support ==
On 14 July 2020, Techsmith shut down the support for uploading to Screencast.com in line with the previously-announced end of support for Jing. TechSmith also changed the Jing product page to point to a new product named TechSmith Capture that performs a similar function.

== See also ==
- Comparison of screencasting software
- Screencasting software
