= GraphicsMagick =

Free and open-source image manipulation software

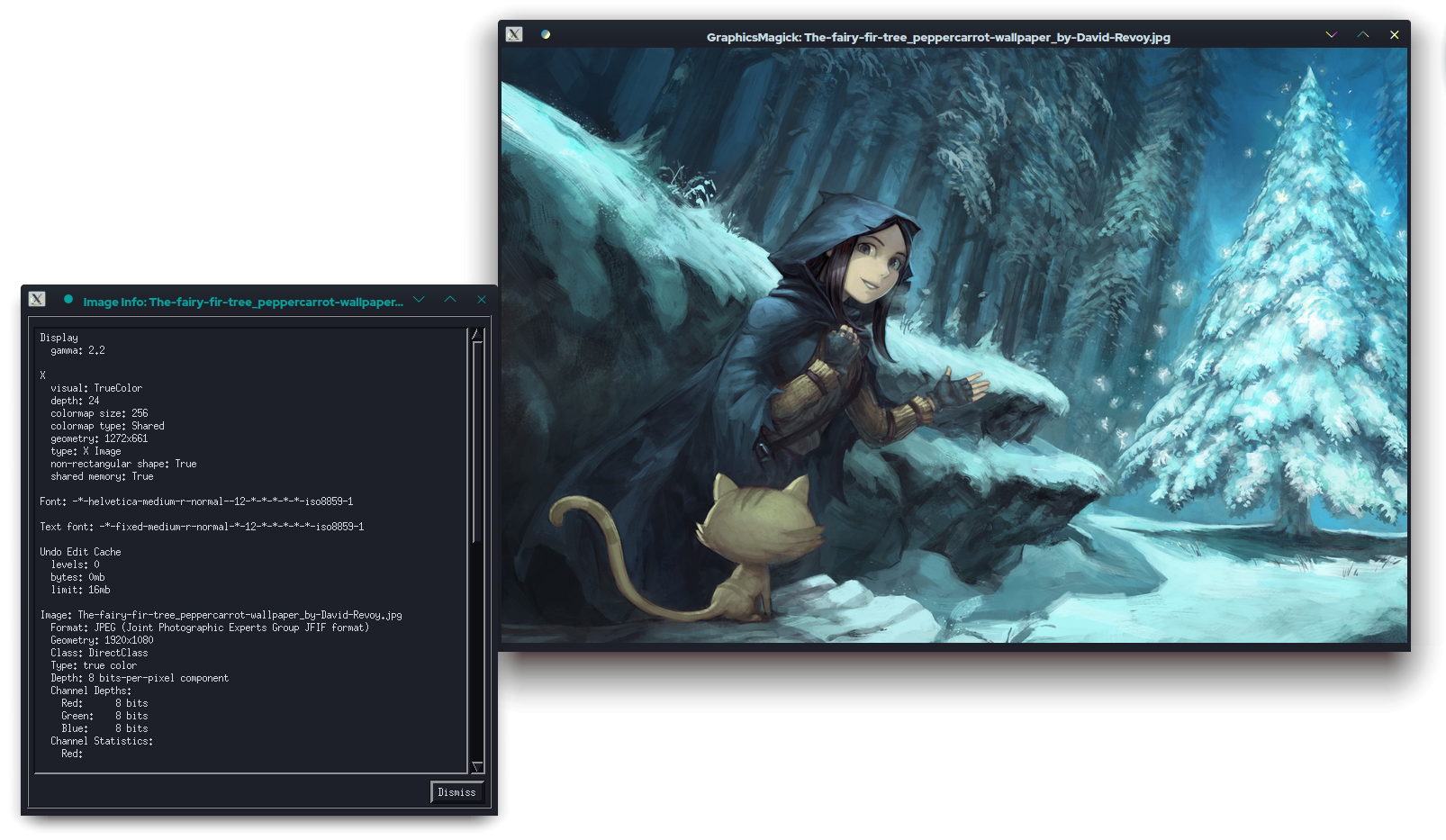
- Developer: GraphicsMagick Group
- Release: 2002; 24 years ago
- Stable release: 1.3.49 / 8 October 2026
- Written in: C
- Operating system: Cross-platform
- Type: Graphics software
- License: MIT License
- Website: www.graphicsmagick.org
- Repository: sourceforge.net/p/graphicsmagick/code/

GraphicsMagick, invoked from the command line as gm, is a fork of ImageMagick, emphasizing stability of both programming API and command-line options. It was branched off ImageMagick's version 5.5.2 in 2002 after irreconcilable differences emerged in the developers' group.

In addition to the programming language APIs available with ImageMagick, GraphicsMagick also includes a Tcl API, called TclMagick.

GraphicsMagick is used by several websites to process large numbers of uploaded photographs. As of 2023, GraphicsMagick had 4 active code contributors while ImageMagick had 24 active contributors.
