= ImageMagick =

Free and open-source image manipulation software

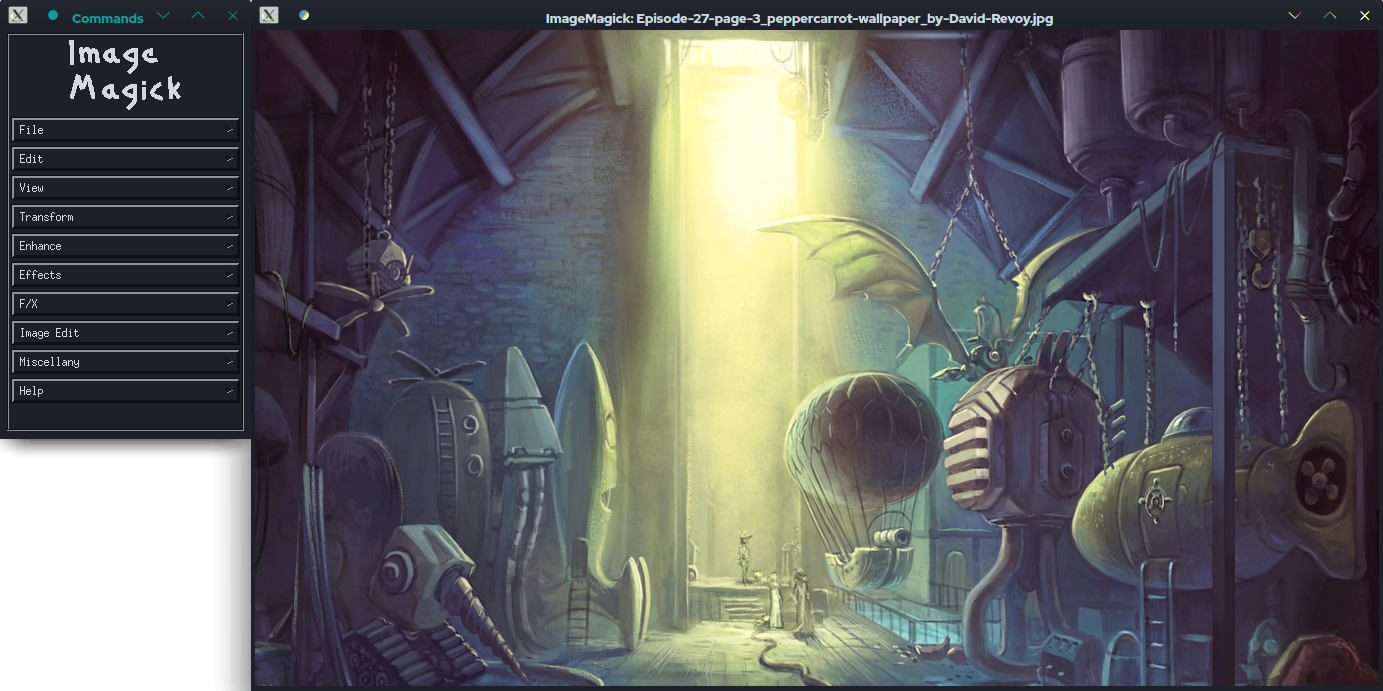
- Screenshot of display, with menu
- Original author: John Cristy
- Developer: ImageMagick Studio LLC
- Release: 1 August 1990; 36 years ago
- Stable release: 7.1.2.35 / 31 October 2026; 17 days ago
- Written in: C
- Operating system: Cross-platform
- Type: Image manipulation
- License: ImageMagick
- Website: imagemagick.org
- Repository: github.com/ImageMagick/ImageMagick

ImageMagick License
- Author: ImageMagick Studio LLC
- SPDX identifier: ImageMagick
- Debian FSG compatible: Yes
- GPL compatible: Yes
- Linking from code with a different license: Yes
- Website: imagemagick.org

ImageMagick, invoked from the command line as magick or convert, is a free and open-source cross-platform software suite for displaying, creating, converting, modifying, and editing raster images. It can read and write over 200 image file formats and is widely used in open-source applications. ImageMagick was created by John Cristy in 1987.

== History ==
ImageMagick was created in 1987 by John Cristy when working at DuPont, to convert 24-bit images (16 million colors) to 8-bit images (256 colors), so they could be displayed on most screens at the time. It was freely released in 1990 when DuPont agreed to transfer copyright to ImageMagick Studio LLC, still currently the project maintainer organization.

In May 2016, it was reported that ImageMagick had a vulnerability through which an attacker can execute arbitrary code on servers that use the application to edit user-uploaded images. Security researchers at Cloudflare observed use of the vulnerability in active hacking attempts. The security flaw was due to ImageMagick calling backend tools without first properly checking to ensure path and file names are free of improper shell commands. The vulnerability did not affect ImageMagick distributions that included a properly configured security policy.

== Features and capabilities ==
The software mainly consists of a number of command-line interface utilities for manipulating images. ImageMagick does not have a robust graphical user interface to edit images as do Adobe Photoshop and GIMP, but does include – for Unix-like operating systems – a basic native X Window GUI (called IMDisplay) for rendering and manipulating images and API libraries for many programming languages. The program uses magic numbers to identify image file formats.

A number of programs, such as Drupal, MediaWiki, phpBB, and vBulletin, can use ImageMagick to create image thumbnails if installed. ImageMagick is also used by other programs, such as LyX, for converting images.

ImageMagick has a fully integrated Perl binding called PerlMagick, as well as many others: G2F (Ada), MagickCore (C), MagickWand (C), ChMagick (Ch), ImageMagickObject (COM+), Magick++ (C++), JMagick (Java), L-Magick (Lisp), NMagick (Neko/Haxe), MagickNet (.NET), PascalMagick (Pascal), MagickWand for PHP (PHP), IMagick (PHP), PythonMagick (Python), RMagick (Ruby), and TclMagick (Tcl/Tk).

=== File format conversion ===
One of the basic and implemented features of ImageMagick is its ability to efficiently and accurately convert images between different file formats (it uses the command magick to achieve this).

=== Color quantization ===
The number of colors in an image can be reduced to an arbitrary number by weighing the most prominent color values present among the pixels of the image.

A related capability is the posterization artistic effect, which also reduces the number of colors represented in an image. The difference between this and standard color quantization is that while in standard quantization the final palette is selected based upon a weighting of the prominence of existing colors in the image, posterization creates a palette of colors smoothly distributed across the spectrum represented in the image. Whereas with standard color quantization all of the final color values are ones that were in the original image, the color values in a posterized image may not have been present in the original image but are in between the original color values.

=== Dithering ===
A fine control is provided for the dithering that occurs during color and shading alterations, including the ability to generate halftone dithering.

=== Liquid rescaling ===
In 2008, support for liquid rescaling was added. This feature allows, for example, rescaling 4:3 images into 16:9 images without distorting the image.

=== Artistic effects ===
ImageMagick includes a variety of filters and features intended to create artistic effects:

- Charcoal sketch transform
- Posterization

=== OpenCL ===
ImageMagick can use OpenCL to use an accelerated graphics card (GPU) for processing.

=== Deep color ===
The Q8 version supports up-to 8 bits-per-pixel component (8-bit grayscale, 24- or 32-bit RGB color). The Q16 version supports up-to 16 bits-per-pixel component (16-bit grayscale, up-to 48- or 64-bit RGB color).

=== Other ===
Below are some other features of ImageMagick:

- Format conversion: convert an image from one format to another (e.g. PNG to JPEG).
- Transform: resize, rotate, crop, flip or trim an image. (Applies these without generation loss on JPEG files, where possible.)
- Transparency: render portions of an image invisible.
- Draw: add shapes or text to an image.
- Decorate: add a border or frame to an image.
- Special effects: blur, sharpen, threshold, or tint an image.
- Animation: assemble a GIF animation file from a sequence of images.
- Text and comments: insert descriptive or artistic text in an image.
- Image identification: describe the format and attributes of an image.
- Composite: overlap one image over another.
- Montage: juxtapose image thumbnails on an image canvas.
- Generalized pixel distortion: correct for, or induce image distortions including perspective.
- Morphology of shapes: extract features, describe shapes and recognize patterns in images.
- Motion picture support: read and write the common image formats used in digital film work.
- Image calculator: apply a mathematical expression to an image or image channels.
- Discrete Fourier transform: implements forward and inverse DFT.
- Color management: accurate color management with color profiles or in lieu of – built-in gamma compression or expansion as demanded by the colorspace.
- High-dynamic-range images: accurately represent the wide range of intensity levels found in real scenes ranging from the brightest direct sunlight to the deepest darkest shadows.
- Encipher or decipher an image: convert ordinary images into unintelligible gibberish and back again.
- Virtual pixel support: convenient access to pixels outside the image region.
- Large image support: read, process, or write mega-, giga-, or tera-pixel image sizes.
- Threads of execution support: ImageMagick is thread safe and most internal algorithms execute in parallel to take advantage of speed-ups offered by multi-core processor chips.
- Heterogeneous distributed processing: certain algorithms are OpenCL-enabled to take advantage of speed-ups offered by executing in concert across heterogeneous platforms consisting of CPUs, GPUs, and other processors.
- Distributed pixel cache: offload intermediate pixel storage to one or more remote servers.

== Distribution ==
ImageMagick is cross-platform, and runs on Microsoft Windows and Unix-like systems including Linux, macOS, iOS, Android, Solaris, Haiku and FreeBSD. The project's source code can be compiled for other systems, including AmigaOS 4.0 and MorphOS. It has been run under IRIX.

== Related software ==
GraphicsMagick (gm) is a fork of ImageMagick 5.5.2 made in 2002, emphasizing the cross-release stability of the programming API and command-line options. GraphicsMagick emerged as a result of irreconcilable differences in the developers' group.

== See also ==
- DevIL
- GD Graphics Library
- Netpbm
- Magick Image File Format
