= List of colleges and universities in Colorado =

Coordinates: 38.9972°N 105.5478°W

This is a list of colleges and universities in the U.S. State of Colorado which range in age and focus of programs. This list also includes other educational institutions providing higher education, meaning tertiary, quaternary, and, in some cases, post-secondary education. State commission data is also provided.

== Public institutions ==
=== Federal institution ===
Federal institution
School	Location	Carnegie Classification	Enrollment (Fall 2024)	Founded
United States Air Force Academy	Colorado Springs	Baccalaureate College	4,114	1954

=== State institutions ===
This table includes locations, governance, institution focus(es), the enrollment head count (the sum of undergraduate and graduate students), and the percentage of these students who qualify as residents of the state.

State institutions
Institution	Location	Carnegie Classification	Enrollment (fall 2024)	Founded
Adams State University	Alamosa	Masters University	2,901	1921
Aims Community College	Fort Lupton, Greeley, Loveland, and Windsor	Associate college	8,542	1967
Arapahoe Community College	Castle Rock and Littleton	Associate college	15,012	1965
Colorado Mesa University	Grand Junction	Baccalaureate college	9,785	1925
Colorado Mountain College	Breckenridge, Carbondale, Dillon, Edwards, Glenwood Springs, Leadville, Rifle, Salida, and Steamboat Springs	Associate/Baccalaureate college	5,494	1967
Colorado Northwestern Community College	Craig and Rangely	Associate college	1,271	1962
Colorado School of Mines	Golden	Special focus institution	8,044	1874
Colorado State University	Fort Collins	Doctoral university	34,096	1870
Colorado State University–Global Campus	Online	Masters University	10,257	2007
Colorado State University Pueblo	Pueblo	Baccalaureate college	6,851	1933
Community College of Aurora	Aurora, Centennial, and Denver	Associate college	8,833	1983
Community College of Denver	Denver	Associate college	7,965	1967
Fort Lewis College	Durango	Baccalaureate college	3,544	1911
Front Range Community College	Fort Collins, Longmont, and Westminster	Associate college	21,970	1968
Lamar Community College	Lamar	Associate college	690	1937
Metropolitan State University of Denver	Denver	Masters University	18,453	1965
Morgan Community College	Fort Morgan	Associate college	1,626	1970
Northeastern Junior College	Sterling	Associate college	1,684	1941
Otero College	La Junta	Associate college	959	1941
Pikes Peak State College	Colorado Springs	Associate college	12,556	1968
Pueblo Community College	Pueblo, Cañon City	Associate college	7,284	1933
Red Rocks Community College	Lakewood and Arvada	Associate college	8,419	1969
Trinidad State College	Trinidad and Alamosa	Associate college	1,613	1925
University of Colorado Boulder	Boulder	Doctoral university	38,799	1876
University of Colorado Colorado Springs	Colorado Springs	Masters University	11,354	1965
University of Colorado Denver	Denver and Aurora	Doctoral university	23,124	1912
University of Northern Colorado	Greeley	Doctoral university	8,869	1889
Western Colorado University	Gunnison	Masters University	3,568	1901

== Private institutions ==
Private institutions
School	Location	Control	Carnegie Classification	Enrollment (Fall 2024)	Founded
Auguste Escoffier School of Culinary Arts	Boulder	Private (for profit)	Special Focus Two-Year: Arts & Design	8,504	2010
Colorado Christian University	Lakewood	Private (not for profit)	Masters University	9,951	1914
Colorado College	Colorado Springs	Private (not for profit)	Baccalaureate College	2,056	1874
Colorado Technical University	Aurora, Colorado Springs	Private (for profit)	Doctoral University	31,830	1965
Nazarene Bible College	Colorado Springs	Private (not for profit)	Faith-related Institution	527	1967
Naropa University	Boulder	Private (not for profit)	Masters University	1,094	1974
Regis University	Denver	Private (not for profit)	Doctoral University	4,605	1877
Rocky Mountain College of Art and Design	Denver	Private (for profit)	Baccalaureate College	2,061	1963
University of Denver	Denver	Private (not for profit)	Doctoral University	12,813	1864
William Howard Taft University	Denver	Private (for profit)	Doctoral University	324	1976

== Defunct colleges and universities ==
Defunct colleges and universities
School	Location	Control	Carnegie Classification	Founded	Defunct
Colorado Heights University	Denver	Private (not for profit)	Baccalaureate / Associates Colleges	1989	2016
Johnson & Wales University	Denver	Private (not for profit)	Masters University	2000	2021
Jones International University	Centennial	Private (for profit)	Masters University	1993	2015
National American University	Centennial, Colorado Springs, Denver	Private (for profit)	Masters University	1941	2018
CollegeAmerica	Fort Collins, Denver, Colorado Springs	Private (not for profit)	Baccalaureate / Associates Colleges	1964	2021

== See also ==
- List of colleges and universities
- List of colleges and universities by country
- Bibliography of Colorado
- Geography of Colorado
- History of Colorado
- Index of Colorado-related articles
- List of Colorado-related lists
- Outline of Colorado
