= Colorado Community College System =

Public community college system in Denver, Colorado, U.S.

- Type: Public community college system
- Established: July 1, 1967
- Budget: $558,000,000 (2019-20)
- Officer in charge: Chancellor
- Chancellor: Marielena DeSanctis
- Students: 125,000
- Postgraduates: 32+ (Note: The system offers only one graduate degree, the Master of Physician Assistant Studies (MPAS) at Red Rocks Community College. That program has approximately 32 students per cohort year. However, this number does not include the number of students the system serves who already hold an undergraduate degree.)
- Other students: 35,000 concurrently enrolled high school students, plus 4,000 technical education students per year
- Location: 9101 E. Lowry Blvd., Denver, Colorado, U.S. 80230, Colorado, United States
- System colleges: 13, plus 6 colleges and technical schools with partially independent governance

The Colorado Community College System is a public community college system in the U.S. state of Colorado. Created by legislation in 1967, it has 13 member institutions and serves more than 163,000 students annually.

== History ==
The 1937 Junior College Reorganization Act laid the foundation for Colorado's existing junior colleges to flourish and local districts to start new junior colleges by providing for local district funding of junior colleges under Colorado's public school districts.

The Community College and Occupational Act of 1967 separated community colleges and vocational schools from sole local district control by establishing a State Board for Community Colleges and Occupational Education (SBCCOE) to share control of a new statewide system with local boards. The act was signed on May 27, and control of the functions, powers, and funds from the state board of education to the SBCCOE took effect on July 1, 1967.

Two Colorado state House Bills brought more change in the late 1980s. In 1985, House Bill 1187 established the SBCCOE as the system governing body, local boards change to advisory councils, oversight of the community college and vocational program merge and the Community College of Denver System was split into three separate community colleges. In 1986, House Bill 1237 abolished and recreated the SBCCOE into its current configuration and mandated that the SBCCOE and Colorado's four-year institutions develop a core academic program for community college students. In 1988, that curriculum was implemented and guaranteed transfer agreements were signed with all Colorado four-year public colleges and universities.

The redevelopment of the former Lowry Air Force Base brought additional land and building space to the SBCCOE. The Lowry Campus offers classroom space and the permanent headquarters of the Colorado Community College System.

== Governance ==
The system is governed by the eleven-member State Board for Community Colleges and Occupational Education (SBCCOE). The nine voting members of the board are appointed by the Governor and confirmed by the State Senate for staggered four-year terms. These nine appointed members are geographically and politically distributed, with one from each of the state's federal congressional districts, plus two at-large members, with no more than five members from any single political party. The two non-voting members are one faculty member and one student member, each selected via the faculty's and students' governance structures respectively.

== Colleges ==
=== State community colleges ===
Colorado Community College System (Colorado)
Location of Colorado community colleges in the Denver metropolitan area. For colleges with multiple campuses, the flagship campus is labeled. Black dots represent state community colleges. Red dots represent technical colleges.
Location of Colorado Community College campuses outside the Denver metropolitan area. For colleges with multiple campuses, the flagship campus is labeled. Black dots represent state community colleges. Blue dots represent locally run community colleges. Red dots represent technical colleges. Green dots represent university-affiliated community colleges.

There are 13 community colleges under direct governance of the SBCCOE, the System's chancellor, and the state system office. For colleges with multiple campuses, an asterisk denotes the flagship campus.

- Arapahoe Community College (Littleton*, Castle Rock, Parker)
- Colorado Community Colleges Online
- Colorado Northwestern Community College (Rangely*, Craig)
- Community College of Aurora (Aurora*, Denver)
- Community College of Denver (Denver)
- Front Range Community College (Westminster*, Fort Collins, Longmont)
- Lamar Community College (Lamar)
- Morgan Community College (Fort Morgan*, Burlington, Bennett, Wray, Limon)
- Northeastern Junior College (Sterling)
- Otero College (La Junta)
- Pikes Peak State College (Colorado Springs)
- Pueblo Community College (Pueblo*, Cañon City, Mancos, Durango, Bayfield)
- Red Rocks Community College (Lakewood*, Arvada)
- Trinidad State College (Trinidad*, Alamosa)

=== Local district community colleges ===
There are two community colleges that are generally governed by local elected boards of trustees within the college's own special electoral district. These colleges are generally not considered a part of the "System" proper, though the SBCCOE has a role in governing the schools.

- Aims Community College (Greeley*, Loveland, Windsor, Fort Lupton)
- Colorado Mountain College (Note: Colorado Mountain College maintains its three flagship residential campuses at Steamboat Springs, Leadville, and Spring Valley at Glenwood Springs. The college's administrative headquarters are located in Glenwood Springs.) (Glenwood Springs, Leadville, Steamboat Springs, Edwards, Rifle, Aspen, Carbondale, Salida, Breckenridge, Dillon)

=== Area technical colleges ===
The state's three area technical colleges are generally governed by local school district boards of education. As with the local district community colleges, these are generally not considered a part of the "System" proper, though the SBCCOE has a role in governing the schools.

- Emily Griffith Technical College (Denver)
- Pickens Technical College (Aurora)
- Technical College of the Rockies (Delta, Montrose)

=== University-affiliated community colleges ===
- Colorado Mesa University Tech (part of Colorado Mesa University)

== See also ==
- List of colleges and universities in Colorado
- Wikimedia Commons: Universities and colleges in Colorado
