= Clark (mascot) =

Mascot of the Chicago Cubs

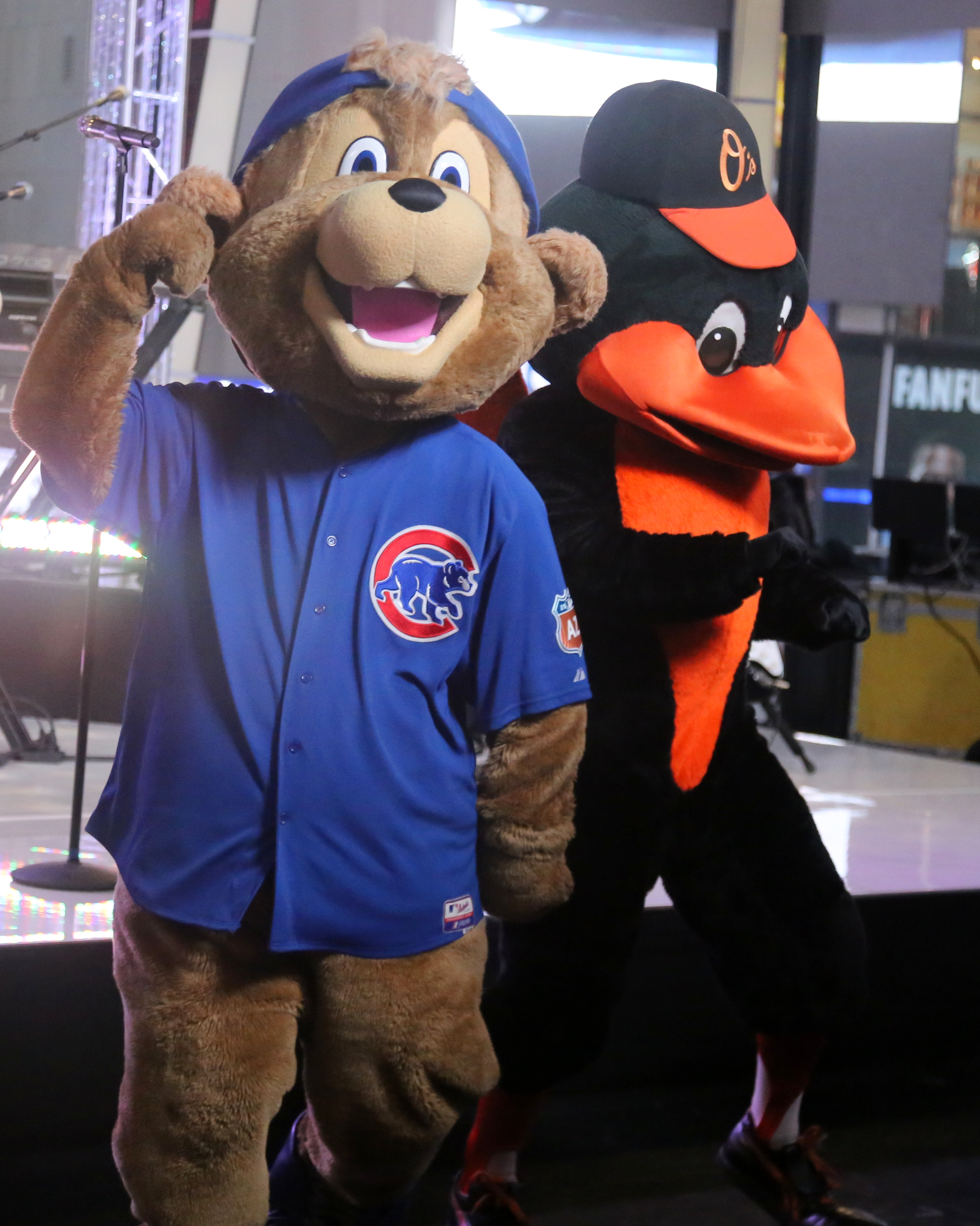
- Clark (left) with the Oriole Bird
- Team: Chicago Cubs
- Description: Bear cub
- First seen: January 13, 2014
- Website: Clark's Crew

Clark is the official team mascot of Major League Baseball's Chicago Cubs. He was announced on January 13, 2014, as the first official mascot in the modern history of the Cubs franchise. He was introduced that day at the Advocate Illinois Masonic Medical Center's pediatric developmental center along with some of the Cubs' top prospects such as number one draft pick Kris Bryant and Albert Almora Jr., Jorge Soler, Mike Olt and Eric Jokisch. Over a dozen Cubs prospects were attending the Cubs' Rookie Development Program that week. The Cubs become the 27th team in Major League Baseball to have a mascot, leaving the Los Angeles Angels, Los Angeles Dodgers and New York Yankees as the remaining franchises without mascots. According to the Cubs' press release, Clark is a response to fan demands (expressed via surveys and interviews) for more kid-friendly elements at Wrigley Field Cubs games to keep pace with games in other cities that have more to offer youth fans.

== Description ==
He is a "young, friendly Cub" who will wear a backwards baseball cap and greet fans entering Wrigley Field, which is located at the corner of Clark Street (for which he is named) and Addison Street. North Clark Street borders the third base side of Wrigley Field. According to the Cubs, the fictional character Clark is descended from Joa, the franchise's original live Bears mascot in 1916.

Clark can be seen in events throughout Chicago, especially in the northern part of the city which is the home district of the team, wearing home or batting practice uniforms with brown pants. For the 2018 Players' Weekend, he was given a special uniform similar to those worn by the team during the weekend with his Twitter handle on the back of his jersey. The tradition carried on through the 2019 season, in which Clark wore home whites for the weekend together with the Cubs players; previously he wore a special uniform during the 2019 Little League World Series Classic in which the Cubs played.

== Activities ==
According to the various stories "The mascot also will greet fans at Wrigley Field before and during games, as well as assist kids in running the bases on Family Sundays. Families can visit Clark's Clubhouse at Wrigley."

== See also ==
- List of Major League Baseball mascots
