= List of Chicago Cubs first-round draft picks =

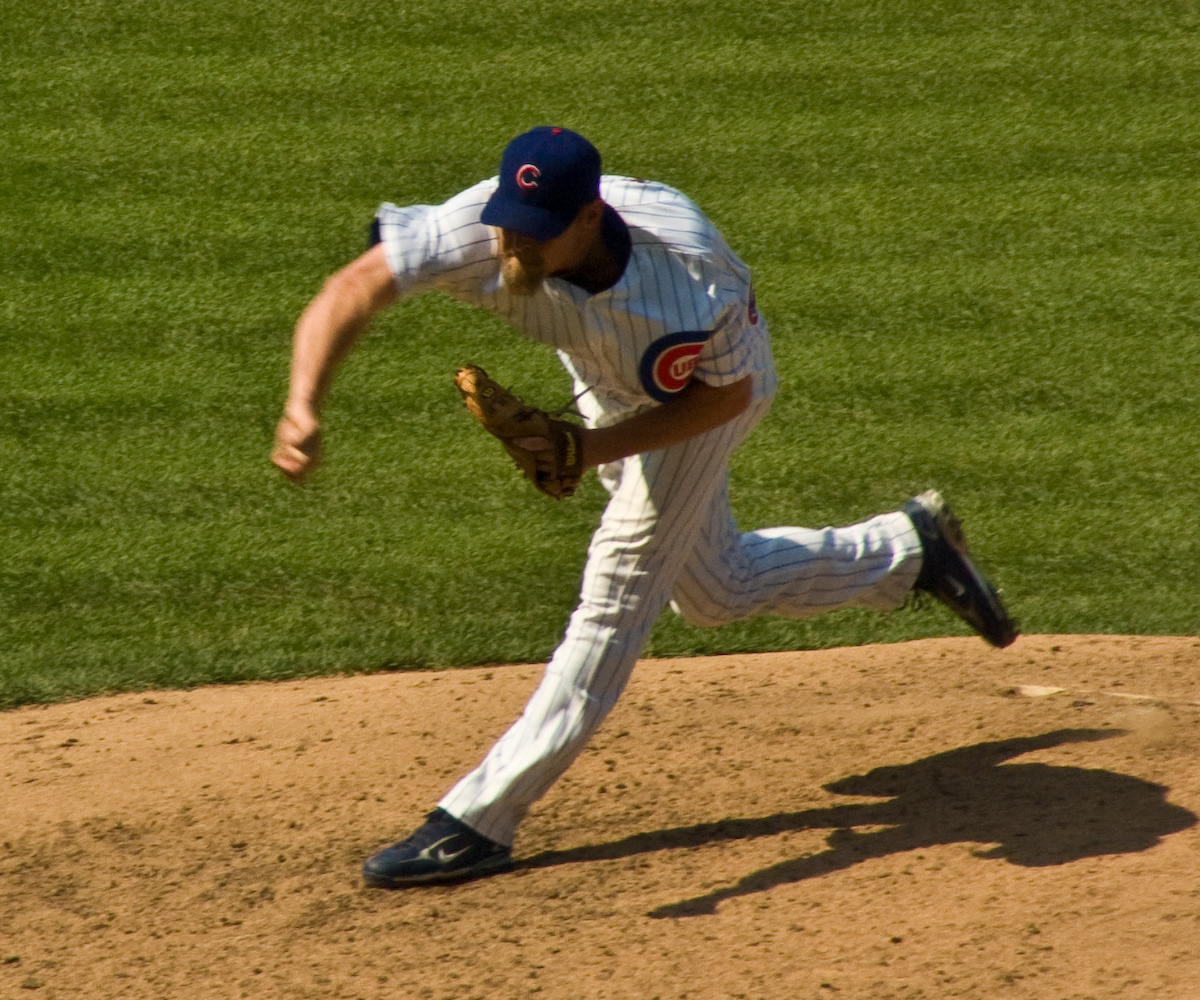
1998 Rookie of the Year Award winner Kerry Wood is one of two Cubs first-round draft picks so honored.

The Chicago Cubs are a Major League Baseball (MLB) franchise based in Chicago, Illinois. They play in the National League Central division. Since the institution of MLB's Rule 4 Draft, the Cubs have selected 68 players in the first round. Officially known as the "First-Year Player Draft", the Rule 4 Draft is MLB's primary mechanism for assigning amateur baseball players from high schools, colleges, and other amateur baseball clubs to its teams. The draft order is determined based on the previous season's standings, with the team possessing the worst record receiving the first pick. In addition, teams which lost free agents in the previous off-season may be awarded compensatory or supplementary picks.

Of the 68 players picked in the first round by the Cubs, 32 have been pitchers, the most of any position; 24 of these were right-handed, while 6 were left-handed. Sixteen players picked in the initial round were outfielders, while ten shortstops, two catchers, and one player each at first base, second base, and third base were also taken. The Cubs drafted 26 players out of high school, and 32 out of college. Chicago has drafted eleven players from high schools or colleges in the state of California, with six more coming from Texas and five from Indiana. The Cubs have also taken four players from their home state of Illinois.

The Cubs' most recent World Series championship, in 2016, was the team's first in 108 years. Four of the Cubs' first-round draft picks—Javier Báez (2011), Albert Almora (2012), Kris Bryant (2013), and Kyle Schwarber (2014)—were on the 2016 World Series roster. No pick has been elected to the Hall of Fame. Bryant is the Cubs' only first-round pick to be named Most Valuable Player in either the National or American League, winning NL honors in 2016. He is also one of two picks to have been named NL Rookie of the Year with the Cubs, receiving this award in 2015; the other is Kerry Wood, selected in 1995 and named Rookie of the Year in 1998. One pick—1985 selection Rafael Palmeiro—is a member of both the 3,000 hit club and the 500 home run club. The Cubs have held the first overall pick in the draft only once, in 1982, when they selected Shawon Dunston.

The Cubs have received 13 compensatory picks, including nine selections made in the supplemental round of the draft since the institution of the First-Year Player Draft in 1965. These additional picks are provided when a team loses a particularly valuable free agent in the previous off-season,^{[V]} or, more recently, if a team fails to sign a draft pick from the previous year. As the Cubs have signed all of their first-round picks, they have never been awarded a supplementary pick under this provision.

== Key ==
Year	Links to an article about that year's Major League Baseball draft
Position	Indicates the secondary/collegiate position at which the player was drafted, rather than the professional position the player may have gone on to play
Pick	Indicates the number of the pick
§	Indicates a supplemental pick
'16	Player was a member of the Cubs' 2016 championship team

== Picks ==
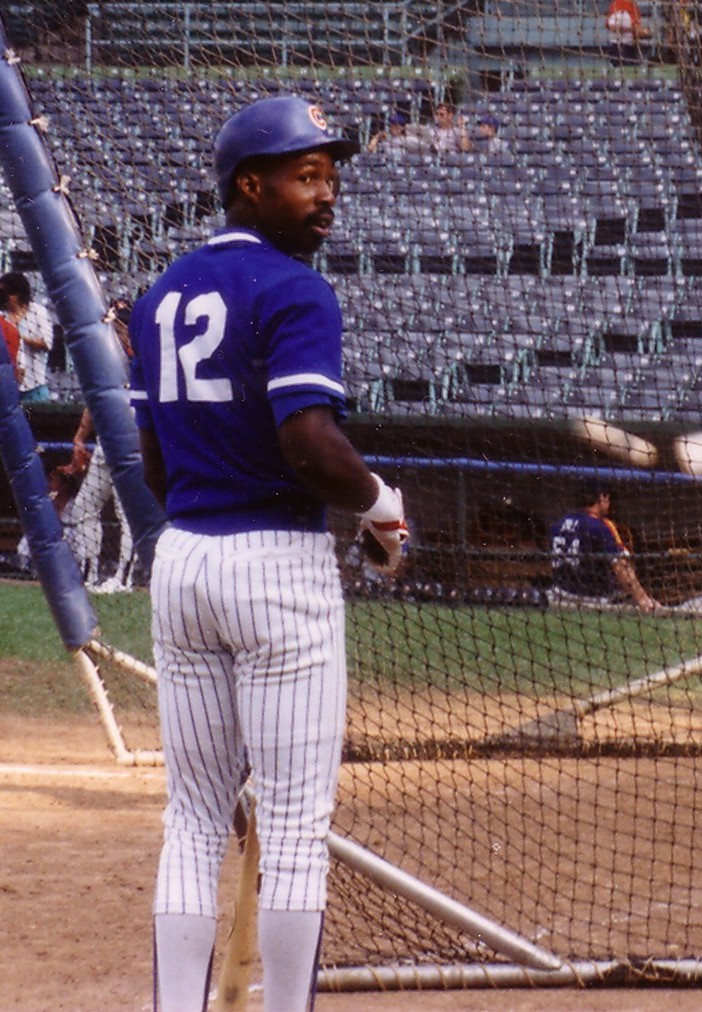
Shawon Dunston (1982) is the only player the Cubs have taken with the first overall pick.

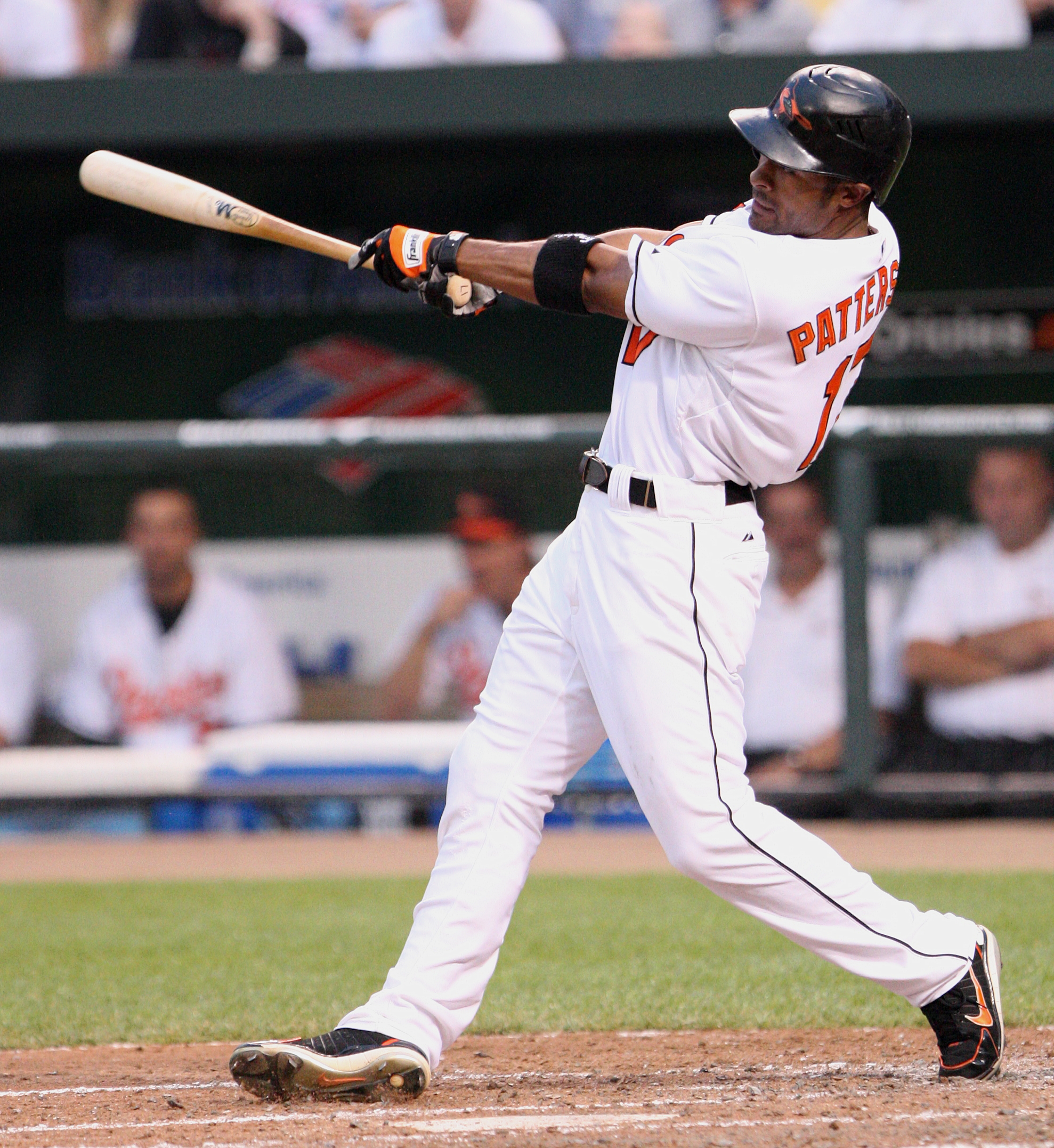
Corey Patterson (1998) is one of fifteen outfielders drafted by the Cubs.

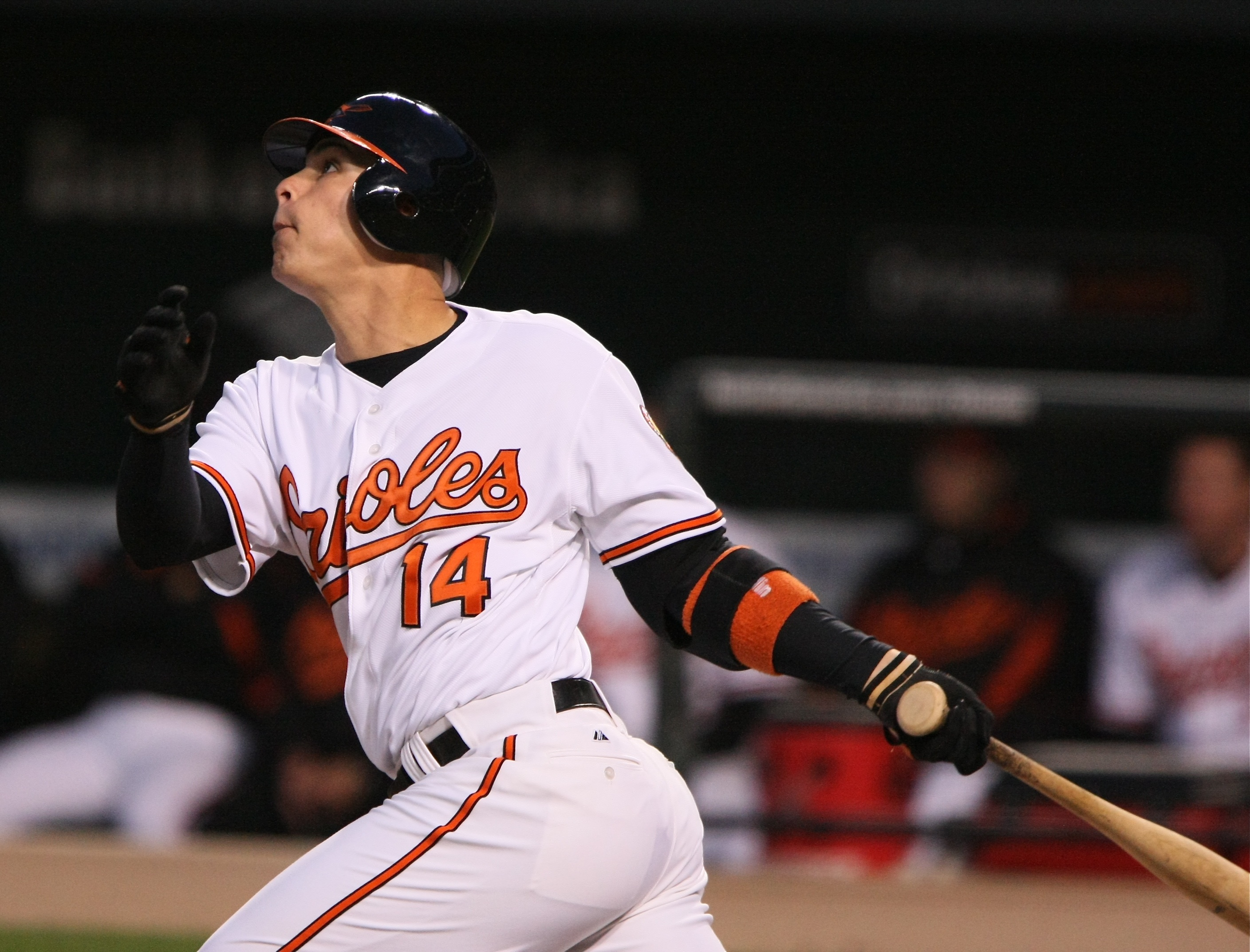
Lou Montañez (2000) is one of seven shortstops taken by the Cubs.

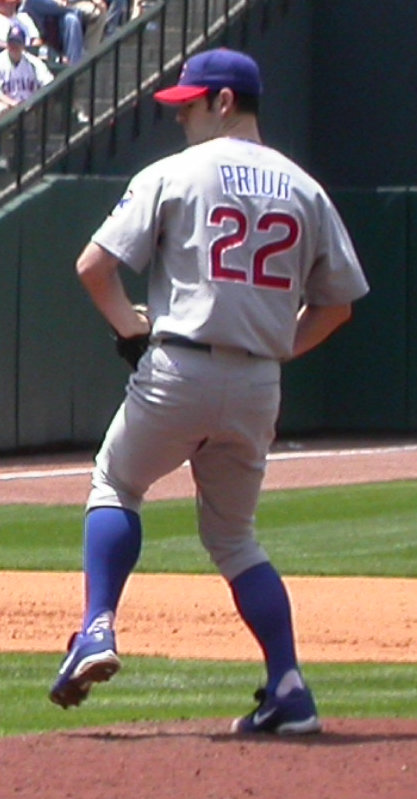
Mark Prior (2001) was selected to the 2003 All-Star team.

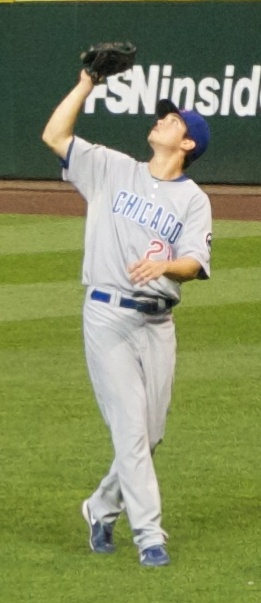
Tyler Colvin (2006) is the Cubs' fourth selection out of South Carolina.

Year	Name	Position	School (location)	Pick	Ref
1965	Rick James	Right-handed pitcher	Coffee High School (Florence, Alabama)	6	
1966	Dean Burk	Right-handed pitcher	Highland High School (Highland, Illinois)	5	
1967	Terry Hughes	Shortstop	Dorman High School (Spartanburg, South Carolina)	2	
1968	Ralph Rickey	Outfielder	University of Oklahoma (Norman, Oklahoma)	15	
1969	Roger Metzger	Shortstop	St. Edward's University (Austin, Texas)	16	
1970	Gene Hiser	Outfielder	University of Maryland, College Park (College Park, Maryland)	19	
1971	Jeff Wehmeier	Right-handed pitcher	Brebeuf Jesuit Preparatory School (Indianapolis, Indiana)	16	
1972	Brian Vernoy	Left-handed pitcher	La Quinta High School (La Quinta, California)	15	
1973	Jerry Tabb	First baseman	University of Tulsa (Tulsa, Oklahoma)	16	
1974	Scot Thompson	Outfielder	Knoch High School (Saxonburg, Pennsylvania)	7	
1975	Brian Rosinski	Outfielder	Evanston Township High School (Evanston, Illinois)	4	
1976	Herman Segelke	Right-handed pitcher	El Camino High School (San Francisco, California)	7	
1977	Randy Martz	Right-handed pitcher	University of South Carolina (Columbia, South Carolina)	12	
1978	Bill Hayes	Catcher	Indiana State University (Terre Haute, Indiana)	13	
1979	Jon Perlman	Right-handed pitcher	Baylor University (Waco, Texas)	12	
1980	Don Schulze	Right-handed pitcher	Lake Park High School (Roselle, Illinois)	11	
1981	Joe Carter	Outfielder	Wichita State University (Wichita, Kansas)	2	
1981	Vance Lovelace	Left-handed pitcher	Hillsborough High School (Tampa, Florida)	16^{[a]}	
1982	Shawon Dunston	Shortstop	Thomas Jefferson High School (Brooklyn, New York)	1	
1982	Tony Woods	Shortstop	Whittier College (Whittier, California)	17^{[b]}	
1982	Stan Boderick	Outfielder	Thomas Richard Robinson High School (Tampa, Florida)	27§^{[c]}	
1983	Jackie Davidson	Right-handed pitcher	Everman Joe C. Bean High School (Everman, Texas)	6	
1984	Drew Hall	Left-handed pitcher	Morehead State University (Morehead, Kentucky)	3	
1985	Rafael Palmeiro	Outfielder	Mississippi State University (Starkville, Mississippi)	22^{[d]}	
1985	Dave Masters	Right-handed pitcher	University of California, Berkeley (Berkeley, California)	24	
1986	Derrick May	Outfielder	Newark High School (Newark, Delaware)	9	
1987	Mike Harkey	Right-handed pitcher	California State University, Fullerton (Fullerton, California)	4	
1988	Ty Griffin	Second baseman	Georgia Institute of Technology (Atlanta, Georgia)	9	
1989	Earl Cunningham	Outfielder	Lancaster High School (Lancaster, South Carolina)	11	
1990	Lance Dickson	Left-handed pitcher	University of Arizona (Tucson, Arizona)	23	
1991	Doug Glanville	Outfielder	University of Pennsylvania (Philadelphia, Pennsylvania)	12	
1992	Derek Wallace	Right-handed pitcher	Pepperdine University (Malibu, California)	11	
1993	Brooks Kieschnick	Outfielder	University of Texas at Austin (Austin, Texas)	10	
1993	Jon Ratliff	Right-handed pitcher	Le Moyne College (Syracuse, New York)	24^{[e]}	
1993	Kevin Orie	Shortstop	Indiana University Bloomington (Bloomington, Indiana)	29§^{[f]}	
1994	Jayson Peterson	Right-handed pitcher	East High School (Denver, Colorado)	15	
1995	Kerry Wood	Right-handed pitcher	Grand Prairie High School (Grand Prairie, Texas)	4	
1996	Todd Noel	Right-handed pitcher	North Vermillion High School (Maurice, Louisiana)	17	
1997	Jon Garland	Right-handed pitcher	John F. Kennedy High School (Granada Hills, California)	10	
1998	Corey Patterson	Outfielder	Harrison High School (Kennesaw, Georgia)	3	
1999	Ben Christensen	Outfielder	Wichita State University (Wichita, Kansas)	26	
2000	Lou Montañez	Shortstop	Miami Coral Park High School (Miami, Florida)	3	
2001	Mark Prior	Right-handed pitcher	University of Southern California (Los Angeles, California)	2	
2002	Bobby Brownlie	Right-handed pitcher	Rutgers University–New Brunswick (New Brunswick, New Jersey)	21	
2002	Luke Hagerty	Left-handed pitcher	Ball State University (Muncie, Indiana)	32§^{[g]}	
2002	Chadd Blasko	Right-handed pitcher	Purdue University (West Lafayette, Indiana)	36§^{[h]}	
2002	Matthew Clanton	Right-handed pitcher	Orange Coast College (Costa Mesa, California)	38§^{[i]}	
2003	Ryan Harvey	Outfielder	Dunedin High School (Dunedin, Florida)	6	
2004	no first-round pick^{[j]}				
2005	Mark Pawelek	Left-handed pitcher	Springville High School (Springville, Utah)	20	
2006	Tyler Colvin	Outfielder	Clemson University (Clemson, South Carolina)	13	
2007	Josh Vitters	Third baseman	Cypress High School (Cypress, California)	3	
2007	Josh Donaldson	Catcher	Auburn University (Auburn, Alabama)	48§^{[k]}	
2008	Andrew Cashner	Right-handed pitcher	Texas Christian University (Fort Worth, Texas)	19	
2008	Ryan Flaherty	Shortstop	Vanderbilt University (Nashville, Tennessee)	41§^{[l]}	
2009	Brett Jackson	Outfielder	University of California, Berkeley (Berkeley, California)	31	
2010	Hayden Simpson	Right-handed pitcher	Southern Arkansas University (Magnolia, Arkansas)	16	
2011	Javier Báez '16	Shortstop	Arlington Country Day School (Jacksonville, Florida)	9	
2012	Albert Almora '16	Outfielder	Mater Academy Charter School (Hialeah Gardens, Florida)	6	
2012	Pierce Johnson	Right-handed pitcher	Missouri State University (Springfield, Missouri)	43§^{[m]}	
2012	Paul Blackburn	Right-handed pitcher	Heritage High School (Brentwood, California) (Note: This is the city in Contra Costa County, and not to be confused with the Los Angeles neighborhood of the same name.)	56§^{[n]}	
2013	Kris Bryant '16	Third baseman	University of San Diego (San Diego, California)	2	
2014	Kyle Schwarber '16	Catcher	Indiana University Bloomington (Bloomington, Indiana)	4	
2015	Ian Happ	Outfielder	University of Cincinnati (Cincinnati, Ohio)	9	
2016	no first-round pick ^{o}				
2017	Brendon Little	Left-handed pitcher	State College of Florida, Manatee–Sarasota (Bradenton, Florida)	27	
2017	Alex Lange	Right-handed pitcher	Louisiana State University (Baton Rouge, Louisiana)	30	
2018	Nico Hoerner	Shortstop	Stanford University (Stanford, California)	24	
2019	Ryan Jensen	Right-handed pitcher	Fresno State (Fresno, California)	24	
2020	Ed Howard	Shortstop	Mount Carmel High School (Chicago, Illinois)	16	
2021	Jordan Wicks	Left-handed pitcher	Kansas State University (Manhattan, Kansas)	21	
2022	Cade Horton	Right-handed pitcher	University of Oklahoma (Norman, Oklahoma)	7	
2023	Matt Shaw	Shortstop	University of Maryland (College Park, Maryland)	13	
2024	Cam Smith	Third baseman	Florida State University (Tallahassee, Florida)	14	
2025	Ethan Conrad	Outfielder	Wake Forest University (Winston-Salem, North Carolina)	17	
2026	Cade Townsend	Right-handed pitcher	University of Mississippi (Oxford, Mississippi)	23	

== See also ==
- Chicago Cubs minor league players

== Footnotes ==
- ^{V} Through the 2012 draft, free agents were evaluated by the Elias Sports Bureau and rated "Type A", "Type B", or not compensation-eligible. If a team offered arbitration to a player but that player refused and subsequently signed with another team, the original team was able to receive additional draft picks. If a "Type A" free agent left in this way, his previous team received a supplemental pick and a compensatory pick from the team with which he signed. If a "Type B" free agent left in this way, his previous team received only a supplemental pick. Since the 2013 draft, free agents are no longer classified by type; instead, compensatory picks are only awarded if the team offered its free agent a contract worth at least the average of the 125 current richest MLB contracts. However, if the free agent's last team acquired the player in a trade during the last year of his contract, it is ineligible to receive compensatory picks for that player.
- ^{a} The Cubs gained a compensatory first-round pick in 1981 from the Cincinnati Reds for losing free agent Larry Biittner.
- ^{b} The Cubs gained a compensatory first-round pick in 1982 from the Montreal Expos for losing free agent Tim Blackwell.
- ^{c} The Cubs gained a supplemental first-round pick in 1982 for losing free agent Tim Blackwell.
- ^{d} The Cubs gained a compensatory first-round pick in 1985 from the Baltimore Orioles for losing free agent Tim Stoddard.
- ^{e} The Cubs gained a compensatory first-round pick in 1993 from the Atlanta Braves for losing free agent Greg Maddux.
- ^{f} The Cubs gained a supplemental first-round pick in 1993 for losing free agent Greg Maddux.
- ^{g} The Cubs gained a supplemental first-round pick in 2002 for losing free agent David Weathers.
- ^{h} The Cubs gained a supplemental first-round pick in 2002 for losing free agent Rondell White.
- ^{i} The Cubs gained a supplemental first-round pick in 2002 for losing free agent Todd Van Poppel.
- ^{j} The Cubs lost their first-round pick in 2004 to the Minnesota Twins as compensation for signing free agent LaTroy Hawkins.
- ^{k} The Cubs gained a supplemental first-round pick in 2007 for losing free agent Juan Pierre.
- ^{l} The Cubs gained a supplemental first-round pick in 2008 for losing free agent Jason Kendall.
- ^{m} The Cubs gained a supplemental first-round pick in 2012 for losing free agent Aramis Ramírez.
- ^{n} The Cubs gained a supplemental first-round pick in 2012 for losing free agent Carlos Pena.
- ^{o} The Cubs lost their first-round pick in 2016 to the St. Louis Cardinals as compensation for signing free agent Jason Heyward.
