= Metropolitan State University of Denver =

Public university in Denver, Colorado, US

- Former names: Metropolitan State College (1965–1990); Metropolitan State College of Denver (1990–2012)
- Motto: "Changemakers Wanted"; On Seal: "Excellence in Teaching and Learning"
- Type: Public university
- Established: 1965
- Academic affiliations: CUMU; Space-grant
- Endowment: $30.6 million (2025)
- President: Janine A. Davidson
- Provost: Matthew S. Makley
- Total staff: 2,848 (faculty, student, and non-academic staff as of Jan. 2022)
- Students: 18,336 (fall 2025)
- Undergraduates: 17,111 (fall 2025)
- Postgraduates: 1,225 (fall 2025)
- Location: Denver, Colorado, U.S. 39.7440°N 105.0115°W
- Campus: Urban,126 acres (51 ha)
- Newspaper: The Metropolitan
- Colors: Blue & red
- Nickname: Roadrunners
- Sporting affiliations: NCAA Division II – Rocky Mountain
- Mascot: Rowdy the Roadrunner
- Website: msudenver.edu

Metropolitan State University of Denver (MSU Denver or Metro State) is a public university in Denver, Colorado, United States. It is located on the Auraria Campus, along with the University of Colorado Denver and the Community College of Denver, in downtown Denver, adjacent to Speer Boulevard and Colfax Avenue. In the fall 2025 semester, MSU Denver had an enrollment of 17,111 undergraduate students and 1,225 graduate students.

== History ==
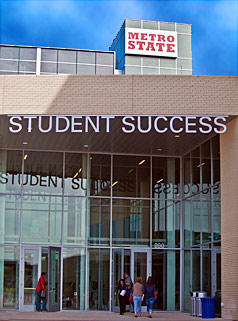
The MSU Denver Jordan Student Success Building opened to students during the Spring 2012 semester

Metropolitan State University of Denver was founded in 1965 as an opportunity school. By design, MSU Denver is required to be accessible to all, which is why it consistently has some of the lowest tuitions of four-year Colorado colleges and universities. Nearly 54% of the student body are students of color.

MSU Denver was the first university to advocate for DREAMers to have a chance at higher education by providing in-state tuition rates under the ASSET bill, signed by then Gov. John Hickenlooper in the Jordan Student Success Building lobby. It made national headlines.

== Campus ==
MSU Denver shares the Auraria campus with two other higher education institutions, the University of Colorado Denver and Community College of Denver. The traditional main entrance to campus is Speer & Lawrence between the North and Science buildings.

The campus is located in the heart of the central business district. The reclaimed Callie Maher brewery, which closed in 1969, now operates as the Tivoli Student Union.

== Organization and administration ==
Janine Anne Davidson became president of MSU Denver on July 24, 2017.

Matthew Makley was named provost effective April 2025.

On June 7, 2002, Governor Bill Owens signed House Bill 1165 – Concerning the Establishment of an Independent Governing Board for Metropolitan State College of Denver – and named his appointees to MSU Denver's board of trustees.

MSU Denver's student government operates under the name "The Student Advocacy Council" (TSAC).

=== Schools and centers ===
MSU Denver contains four colleges and two schools.

- College of Aerospace, Computing, Engineering and Design
- College of Business
- College of Health and Human Sciences
- College of Letters, Arts and Sciences
- School of Education
- School of Hospitality

Metropolitan State University of Denver is also home to a variety of projects, research centers, and institutes.

=== Accreditation ===
MSU Denver is accredited by the Higher Learning Commission (HLC). Several programs and units are accredited by disciplinary-specific organizations, including:

- The Department of Art is accredited by the National Association of Schools of Art and Design (NASAD).
- The College of Business is accredited by the Association to Advance Collegiate Schools of Business (AACSB).
- The Bachelor of Science in Computer Science and Bachelor of Science in Computer Information Systems programs are accredited by ABET.

== University names ==
Colloquially referred to as Metro State or Metro, MSU Denver formally became a university on April 18, 2012.

- 1965–1990: Metropolitan State College
- 1990–2012: Metropolitan State College of Denver
- 2012–present: Metropolitan State University of Denver

=== Name change controversy ===
The then-Metropolitan State College of Denver Board of Trustees on March 9, 2011, approved a legislative proposal to change the institution's name to "Denver State University" following a vote among students and faculty.

University of Denver administration and faculty publicly objected to "Denver State University" as MSU Denver's new name, arguing that the name would cause confusion between the two institutions and encroach on DU's longstanding identity. As a result of this, the board of trustees decided to cancel the planned name change. Some community members objected and viewed this change of plans as allowing a private university (University of Denver) to decide the fate of a public one (MSU Denver).

== Student life ==
Undergraduate demographics as of Fall 2025
Race and ethnicity	Total
White	41%
Hispanic	37%
Black	9%
Two or more races	6%
Asian	5%
American Indian/Alaska Native	1%
International student	1%
Unknown	1%
Economic diversity
Low-income (Note: The percentage of students who received an income-based federal Pell grant intended for low-income students.)	37%
Affluent (Note: The percentage of students who are a part of the American middle class at the bare minimum.)	63%

=== Greek life ===
The institution has various fraternity and sorority chapters.

=== Student media ===
The Office of Student Media supports four student media productions:

- The Metropolitan (newspaper)
- Met Radio – KMET
- Met TV
- Metrosphere

== Athletics ==
MSU Denver has produced 239 All-Americans and was one of the seven charter members of the Colorado Athletic Conference in 1989 before joining the Rocky Mountain Athletic Conference in 1996. MSU Denver competed as a NAIA member until 1983, when the Roadrunners jumped to the NCAA Division II ranks. Since 1998, MSU Denver has captured 32 regular season conference titles, 35 conference tournament championships, as well as the 2000 & 2002 NCAA Division II Men's Basketball, the 2004 and 2006 NCAA Division II Women's Soccer, and the 2026 NCAA Division II Women's Volleyball National Championships.

- Basketball/Volleyball – Auraria Events Center
- Baseball/Soccer/Softball – Regency Athletic Complex
- RMLC/MLCA Men's Lacrosse - Dick's Sporting Good Park

Camps and clinics

- MSU Denver Soccer Camps

== Domestic relationships ==
- University of Arizona
- Adams State University, Colorado Mesa University, Community College of Aurora, Community College of Denver, Front Range Community College, University of Colorado Denver, Western Colorado University
- Fort Hays State University
- Mount Saint Mary's University†‡
- Ohio State University
- University of Puerto Rico
- University of Wisconsin–Milwaukee‡
- University of Wyoming‡

† = private ‡ = London Consortium

== International relationships ==
- China – Open University of China
- Ethiopia – Aksum University (AkU)
- Mexico – University of Guadalajara
- United Kingdom – University of London

== Notable students ==
Individuals of note who have attended the institution include:

- Kat Cammack – U.S. Congressperson
- Brittany Pettersen – U.S. Congressperson
- David W. Ball – writer
- David Barlow – basketball player
- Michelle Beisner-Buck – reporter
- Richard T. Castro – activist
- Steven Emory – soccer player
- Mark Worthington – basketball player
- Pam Grier – actress
- Candi Kubeck – pilot
- Tony Laubach – Meteorologist and storm chaser featured on the Discovery Channel
- Joe Rice – legislator and mayor of Glendale
- Laura J. Richardson – US General
- Hayden Smith – rugby and football player
- Todd Schmitz – swimming coach
- Gary Striewski – journalist
- Gloria Tanner – Colorado state senator
- Benjamin Ortner – basketball player

== See also ==
- List of colleges and universities in Colorado
