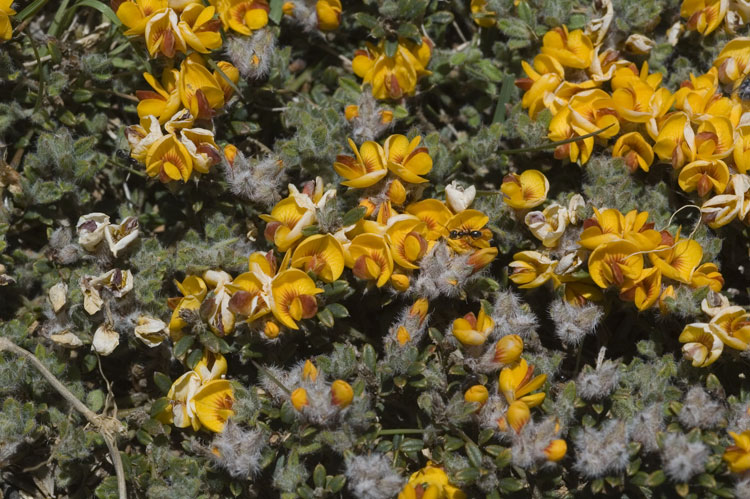
- Near Kiandra

Scientific classification
- Kingdom: Plantae
- Clade: Tracheophytes
- Clade: Angiosperms
- Clade: Eudicots
- Clade: Rosids
- Order: Fabales
- Family: Fabaceae
- Subfamily: Faboideae
- Genus: Pultenaea
- Species: P. polifolia

Binomial name
- Pultenaea polifolia A.Cunn.

= Pultenaea polifolia =

Dusky bush-pea

Species of legume

Pultenaea polifolia, commonly known as dusky bush-pea, is a species of flowering plant in the family Fabaceae and is endemic to south-eastern continental Australia. It is an erect to prostrate shrub with linear or elliptic to egg-shaped leaves with the narrower end towards the base, and yellow to orange and red to purple flowers.

== Description ==
Pultenaea polifolia is an erect to prostrate shrub that typically grows to a height of up to 1.3 m (4 ft 3 in) with hairy stems. The leaves are arranged alternately, linear or elliptic to egg-shaped with the narrower end towards the base, 7–20 mm (0.28–0.79 in) long, 1–6 mm (0.039–0.236 in) wide with stipules 4–5 mm (0.16–0.20 in) long at the base and pressed against the stem. The edge of the leaves curves downwards, the upper surface is glabrous and the lower surface is paler and hairy. The flowers are arranged in clusters of more than three on the ends of branches and are 5–10 mm (0.20–0.39 in) long, each flower on a pedicel 1–2 mm (0.039–0.079 in) long with overlapping, three-lobed bracts 3–8 mm (0.12–0.31 in) long at the base. The sepals are 4–8 mm (0.16–0.31 in) long, joined at the base, and there are narrow egg-shaped bracteoles about 3–8 mm (0.12–0.31 in) long attached to the sepal tube. The standard petal is yellow to red and 6–7 mm (0.24–0.28 in) wide, the wings are yellow to orange and the keel is red to purple. Flowering occurs from October to November and the fruit is a flattened pod 5–10 mm (0.20–0.39 in) long.

== Taxonomy ==
Pultenaea polifolia was first formally described in 1825 by Allan Cunningham in Barron Field's Geographical Memoirs on New South Wales. The meaning of the specific epithet is unclear, but may mean Polium-leaved, "Polium" being now known as Teucrium montanum.

== Distribution and habitat ==
Dusky bush-pea grows in heath and is found in New South Wales south from the New England National Park through the coast and tablelands to the Australian Capital Territory and north-eastern Victoria.
