= Andre President =

American football player (born 1971)

No. 88, 87
- Position: Tight end

Personal information
- Born: June 16, 1971 (age 55); Temple, Texas, U.S.
- Listed height: 6 ft 3 in (1.91 m)
- Listed weight: 255 lb (116 kg)

Career information
- High school: Everman Joe C. Bean (Everman, Texas)
- College: Lamar (CO) (1991–1992); Angelo State (1993–1994)
- NFL draft: 1995: undrafted

Career history
- New England Patriots (1995); Chicago Bears (1995); Philadelphia Eagles (1997)
- Stats at Pro Football Reference

Andre Nathaniel President (born June 16, 1971) is an American former professional football tight end who played one season in the National Football League (NFL) with the New England Patriots and Chicago Bears. He played college football at Lamar Community College and Angelo State University.

== Early life and college ==
Andre Nathaniel President was born on June 16, 1971, in Temple, Texas. He attended Everman Joe C. Bean High School in Everman, Texas.

He played college football at Lamar Community College from 1991 to 1992. He was then a two-year letterman for the Angelo State Rams from 1993 to 1994.

== Professional career ==
After going undrafted in the 1995 NFL draft, President signed with the New England Patriots on April 24. He played in one game for the Patriots before being released on September 28. He was signed to the Patriots' practice squad on October 5.

President was signed off the Patriots' practice squad by the Chicago Bears on October 19, 1995. He appeared in two games for the Bears in 1995. He was released on August 19, 1996.

President signed with the Philadelphia Eagles on February 21, 1997. He was placed on injured reserve on August 18 and spent the entire 1997 season there. He was released by the Eagles on March 2, 1998.
