= Everman Independent School District =

School district in Texas

Location
- Everman, Texas United States of America

District information
- Type: Public
- Superintendent: Felicia Donaldson
- Governing agency: Texas Education Agency
- Budget: $64.2 million
- NCES District ID: 4818810

Students and staff
- Students: 6,039
- Teachers: 408.3
- Staff: 877.2

Other information
- Website: https://www.eisd.org

Everman Independent School District is a public school district based in Everman, Texas (USA). In addition to Everman, the district serves portions of Fort Worth and Forest Hill.

In 2011, the school district was rated "academically acceptable" by the Texas Education Agency. The Texas Education Agency's college readiness performance data shows that only 3.9% (8 out of 206 students) of the graduates of the class of 2010 of the Everman school district met TEA's average performance criterion on SAT or ACT college admission tests.

== Schools ==
=== High Schools (Grades 9-12) ===
- Everman Joe C. Bean High School (Everman)
- Everman Academy High School (Everman)

=== Junior High Schools (Grades 6-8) ===
- Charles Baxter Junior High School (Fort Worth) - Built in 2010
- Roy Johnson STEM Academy (Fort Worth)

=== Elementary Schools (Grades 1-5) ===
- Bishop Elementary School (Everman)
- E. Ray Elementary School (Fort Worth)
- Hommel Elementary School (Everman)
- Roger E. Souder Elementary School (Everman)
- John and Polly Townley Elementary School (Fort Worth) - Built In 2009

=== Primary School (Grades EC-K) ===
- Dan Powell Early Learning Academy (Fort Worth) - Built in 2004

== Students ==
=== Academics ===
STAAR - Percent at Level II Satisfactory Standard or Above (Sum of All Grades Tested)
Subject	Everman ISD	Region 11	State of Texas
Reading	70%	76%	73%
Mathematics	75%	78%	76%
Writing	65%	72%	69%
Science	75%	81%	79%
Soc. Studies	72%	80%	77%
All Tests	72%	77%	75%

Local region and statewide averages on standardized tests typically exceed the average scores of students in Everman. In 2020-2021 State of Texas Assessments of Academic Readiness (STAAR) results, 57% of students in Everman ISD met the "Approaches Grade Level or Above" standard, compared with 69% in Region 11 and 67% in the state of Texas. The average SAT score of the class of 2021 was 885, and the average ACT score was 18.

=== Demographics ===
In the 2020-2021 school year, the school district had a total of 5,644 students, ranging from early childhood education and pre-kindergarten through grade 12. The class of 2015 included 397 graduates; the annual drop-out rate across grades 9-12 was 4.8%.

As of the 2020-2021 school year, the ethnic distribution of the school district was 58.3% Hispanic, 34.5% African American, 3.9% White, 0.7% Asian, 0.1% American Indian, 0.1% Pacific Islander, and 2.4% from two or more races. Economically disadvantaged students made up 95.3% of the student body.
