= Jose Z. Calderon =

American community-based sociologist

José Guillermo Zapata Calderón is a community-based sociologist, educator, author, and organizer. He is an emeritus Professor of Sociology and Chicano/a Latino/a Studies at Pitzer College, and is known for his work in ethnic relations, participatory action research, popular education, community-based teaching, and social justice activism.

He is the recipient of National Association for Chicana and Chicano Studies lifetime achievement award and Founder's Award from Latina/o Sociology Section of American Sociological Association.

== Early life and education ==
Calderón was born to immigrant farm workers from Mexico. He attended Highland High School in Ault, Colorado. He earned an Associate of Arts from Northeastern Junior College in 1968, a Bachelor of Arts in communications from the University of Colorado Boulder in 1970, and a Ph.D. in sociology from the University of California, Los Angeles in 1991.

== Academic career ==
Calderón began his teaching career in the 1970s at Aims College and the University of Northern Colorado, where he helped found the Apostles of Justice/Al Frente de Lucha organization and was instrumental in advancing bilingual Chicano/a Studies programs. In 1991, he joined the faculty at Pitzer College, where he served until his retirement as professor emeritus.

He developed long-standing programs linking students with the United Farm Workers , including a 30-year alternative spring break program engaging with farmworker communities in Delano and La Paz, California.

From 2004 to 2006, he held the Michi and Walter Weglyn Chair in Multicultural Studies at California State Polytechnic University, Pomona.

He was one of the founders of the Pomona Day Labor Center (Pomona Economic Opportunity Center), where he served on the board for 17 years.

Between 2013 and 2015, he served on the Los Angeles County Board of Education. He is a member of the College for All Coalition and the Coalition for a Better Los Angeles.

From 2003 to 2024, he served as President of the Latino and Latina Roundtable of the San Gabriel and Pomona Valley.

== Scholarly work and research ==
Calderón's scholarly work centers on the intersection of sociology, community organizing, and pedagogy.

Calderón has published on issues of race, ethnicity, labor, immigration, and civic engagement. His scholarly works include "Participatory Research, Popular Education, and Action for Social Change" in The Oxford Handbook of Sociology for Social Justice, (Oxford University Press, 2024) and, among others, Lessons From an Activist Intellectual: Teaching, Research, and Organizing for Social Change (University Press of America, 2015).

He is also the editor of Race, Poverty, and Social Justice: Multidisciplinary Perspectives Through Service Learning (Stylus Publishing, 2007), which examines use of learning to address systemic inequality through democratic pedagogy. His most recent co-authored work, Organizing Lessons: Immigrant Attacks and Resistance (MIT Community Innovators Lab, 2022), examines organizing strategies in the face of rising anti-immigrant sentiment.

His research includes studies of immigrant rights organizations, community development initiatives, the development of multiethnic alliances in Southern California, and community engagement in higher education.

== Selected bibliography ==
=== Journal articles and reviews ===
- Calderon, J.Z. (2004-01-01). "Lessons from an Activist Intellectual". Latin American Perspectives. 31: 81–94. doi:10.1177/0094582X03259905.
- Calderon, J.Z. (2020). "Intersectional Organizing and Educational Justice Movements: Strategies for Cross-Movement Solidarities". Proceedings of the 2020 AERA Annual Meeting. doi:10.3102/1579749.
- Calderon, Jose (2011-01-01). "Civic Engagement: A Tool for Building Democracy". Teacher Education and Practice.
- Calderon, Jose Guillermo Zapata (2012-03-15), "One Activist Intellectual's Experience in Surviving and Transforming the Academy", Transforming the Ivory Tower, University of Hawai'i Press, pp. 84–105, doi:10.21313/hawaii/9780824835262.003.0005, ISBN 978-0-8248-3526-2, archived from the original on 2024-08-15
- Calderon, Jose Zapata (2000). "Review of Between Two Nations: The Political Predicament of Latinos in New York City". Contemporary Sociology. 29 (3): 524–525. doi:10.2307/2653959. ISSN 0094-3061. JSTOR 2653959.

=== Books and chapters ===
- Calderón, José Z. (2015-08-11). Lessons from an Activist Intellectual: Teaching, Research, and Organizing for Social Change. Bloomsbury Academic. ISBN 978-0-7618-6588-9.
- Calderon, J.Z. (2023). Race, Poverty, and Social Justice: Multidisciplinary Perspectives Through Service Learning. Routledge, Taylor & Francis. ISBN 9781003446644.
- Calderón, J. Z.; Cadena, G. (2023). "Linking Critical Democratic Pedagogy, Multiculturalism, and Service Learning to a Project-Based Approach". In Calderon, J.Z. (ed.). Race, Poverty, and Social Justice: Multidisciplinary Perspectives Through Service Learning. pp. 63–80. doi:10.4324/9781003446644-6. ISBN 978-1-003-44664-4.
- Calderon, J.Z. (2006). "Rose M. Calderon". In Ruiz, V. L.; Korrol, V. Sánchez (eds.). Latinas in the United States: A Historical Encyclopedia. Indiana University Press. ISBN 0253346800.
- Calderon, J.Z.; Horton, J. (1995). The politics of diversity: immigration, resistance, and change in Monterey Park, California. Philadelphia: Temple University Press. ISBN 978-1-56639-328-7.
- Zapata Calderon, Jose (2024-09-19), "Participatory Research, Popular Education, and Action for Social Change", in Dolgon, Corey (ed.), The Oxford Handbook of Sociology for Social Justice (1 ed.), Oxford University Press, pp. 303–314, doi:10.1093/oxfordhb/9780197615317.013.16, ISBN 978-0-19-761531-7
- Calderon, J.Z.; Victor, N. (2022). Organizing Lessons Immigrant Attacks and Resistance! (PDF). MIT Community Innovators Lab. p. 112. ISBN 978-1-7372-2134-0.
