= Forest Hill, Texas =

- City
- City of Forest Hill
- Location of Forest Hill in Tarrant County, Texas
- Coordinates: 32°39′44″N 97°15′26″W
- Country: United States
- State: Texas
- County: Tarrant

Government
  - Type: Council-Manager

Area
  - Total: 4.17 sq mi (10.80 km^{2})
  - Land: 4.17 sq mi (10.80 km^{2})
  - Water: 0 sq mi (0.00 km^{2})
- Elevation: 653 ft (199 m)

Population (2020)
  - Total: 13,955
  - Estimate (2025): 14,056
  - Density: 3,345.7/sq mi (1,291.79/km^{2})
- Time zone: UTC-6 (CST)
  - Summer (DST): UTC-5 (CDT)
- ZIP code: 76119 and 76140
- Area code: 817
- FIPS code: 48-26544
- GNIS feature ID: 2410519
- Website: ForestHillTX.org

Forest Hill is a suburb of Fort Worth in Tarrant County, Texas, United States. The population was 13,955 at the 2020 census.

== History ==
Forest Hill began around 1860. The community was called Brambleton Station and Forest Hill Village before being named Forest Hill. By 1896 the community had its first schools and was established as a suburb of Fort Worth. In 1905 Old Mansfield Road and Forest Hill Drive were the city's two main roads. In 1912 citizens drilled a "crooked hole well," the first private water system in the community. By 1925 the community had 25 residents and two businesses. Forest Hill gained a new source of water in the early 1940s. By 1944 Trentman Company and the Johnson Campbell Company began building homes. The owners of the private water system sold it to Texas Water Company.

The community incorporated as a village on March 16, 1946. In the late 1940s the village had around 90 people. In 1949 the village petitioned to be relabeled as a city after reaching 500 citizens; on April 8 of that year the village was relabeled as a city. By 1954 the volunteer fire department, the court, and the corporation court opened. The city had 1,519 people in the mid-1950s.

The city expanded in the 1960s. In 1967 the city had 3,800 people; the city grew due to its proximity to Fort Worth. By the early 1970s the city adopted the Forest Hill Home Rule Charter in order to more easily annex territory and to allow for better governance. The city had 10,250 people in 1976 and 11,482 in 1990. In the 1970s, it elected its first female mayor, Jackie Larson.

== Geography ==
According to the United States Census Bureau, the city has a total area of 4.2 square miles (11.0 km^{2}), all land.

== Demographics ==
Historical population
Census	Pop.	Note	%±
1950	1,519		—
1960	3,221		112.0%
1970	8,236		155.7%
1980	11,684		41.9%
1990	11,482		−1.7%
2000	12,949		12.8%
2010	12,355		−4.6%
2020	13,955		13.0%
2025 (est.)	14,056		0.7%
U.S. Decennial Census

=== Racial and ethnic composition ===
Forest Hill city, Texas – Racial and ethnic composition Note: the US Census treats Hispanic/Latino as an ethnic category. This table excludes Latinos from the racial categories and assigns them to a separate category. Hispanics/Latinos may be of any race.
Race / Ethnicity (NH = Non-Hispanic)	Pop 2000	Pop 2010	Pop 2020	% 2000	% 2010	% 2020
White alone (NH)	2,967	1,441	1,216	22.91%	11.66%	8.71%
Black or African American alone (NH)	7,355	5,938	5,490	56.80%	48.06%	39.34%
Native American or Alaska Native alone (NH)	42	29	11	0.32%	0.23%	0.08%
Asian alone (NH)	140	68	151	1.08%	0.55%	1.08%
Native Hawaiian or Pacific Islander alone (NH)	0	5	0	0.00%	0.04%	0.00%
Other Race alone (NH)	8	34	31	0.06%	0.28%	0.22%
Mixed race or Multiracial (NH)	88	125	199	0.68%	1.01%	1.43%
Hispanic or Latino (any race)	2,349	4,715	6,857	18.14%	38.16%	49.14%
Total	12,949	12,355	13,955	100.00%	100.00%	100.00%

=== 2020 census ===
As of the 2020 census, Forest Hill had a population of 13,955. The median age was 34.4 years. 28.0% of residents were under the age of 18 and 13.4% of residents were 65 years of age or older. For every 100 females there were 94.4 males, and for every 100 females age 18 and over there were 91.9 males age 18 and over.

100.0% of residents lived in urban areas, while 0.0% lived in rural areas.

There were 4,308 households in Forest Hill, of which 42.3% had children under the age of 18 living in them. Of all households, 46.0% were married-couple households, 16.0% were households with a male householder and no spouse or partner present, and 31.3% were households with a female householder and no spouse or partner present. About 18.9% of all households were made up of individuals and 9.6% had someone living alone who was 65 years of age or older.

There were 4,500 housing units, of which 4.3% were vacant. The homeowner vacancy rate was 1.0% and the rental vacancy rate was 7.1%.

Racial composition as of the 2020 census
Race	Number	Percent
White	2,736	19.6%
Black or African American	5,557	39.8%
American Indian and Alaska Native	156	1.1%
Asian	156	1.1%
Native Hawaiian and Other Pacific Islander	3	0.0%
Some other race	3,190	22.9%
Two or more races	2,157	15.5%

== Transportation ==
By 1911 the city became a stop on the Fort Worth Southern Traction Company's electric urban railway from Fort Worth to Cleburne. The streetcar line operated on an hourly basis in the 1900s.

== Education ==
Forest Hill is partly in the Everman Independent School District and partly in the Fort Worth Independent School District.

Two primary schools, Harlean Beal Elementary School and David K. Sellars Elementary School, serve separate areas within the FWISD section of Forest Hill. The FWISD secondary schools that serve the section of Forest Hill, located in Fort Worth, include Glencrest 6th Grade School, Forest Oak Middle School, and O. D. Wyatt High School.

In 1896 Forest Hill schools had three teachers, 91 white students, and 15 black students. By 1905 Forest Hill, now having no schools for black students, had two schools, four teachers, and 226 students.

Students living in the Everman Independent School District portion of the city attend Roger E. Souder Elementary School, Dan Powell Intermediate School, Everman Junior High School and Everman High School.
