= Richard T. Castro =

American politician

Richard Thomas Castro
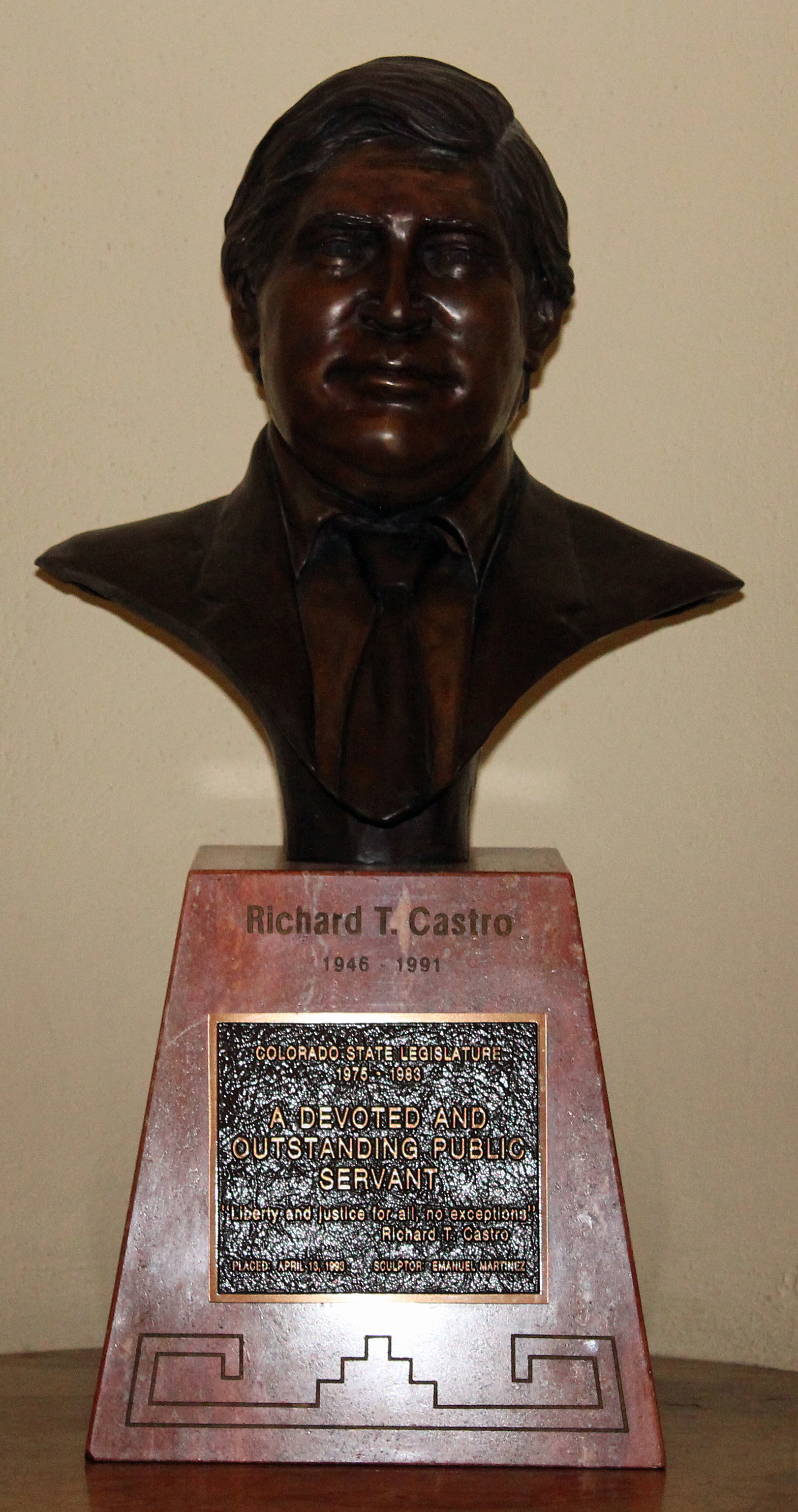
- The bust of Richard Castro on display in the Colorado State Capitol Building. The work is by artist Emanuel Martínez.
- Born: 1946
- Died: April 13, 1991 (age 44 or 45)
- Occupations: Director of the Agency for Human Rights and Community Relations; Chairman of the West Side Coalition
- Political party: Democratic

Richard Thomas Castro (1946 – April 13, 1991), an educational and civil rights activist, was director of Denver's Agency for Human Rights and Community Relations at the time of his death from an aneurysm. In the 1970s, Castro had been the chairperson of the West Side Coalition, a Denver neighborhood organization. During that time, he was the subject of an attempted dynamite attack on his house, allegedly by Chicano radicals associated with Crusade for Justice members. He was beaten by Denver police and was shot.

It is rare that one man can be community activist, educator, politician and devout family man and friend. Richard Castro did it all. "It was all part of the movement. You can't separate them," his wife, Virginia Castro said. And indeed, it was.

Richard Castro was born in Walsenburg, Colorado to father Archie and mother Josephine. With his ancestral roots in the southern Colorado coal mines and in soldiered frontiers of northern New Mexico, his ancestors have inhabited the land for centuries. Virginia Castro's mother was born in Mexico and came to Colorado around 1925. She met her husband in the fields on the western slope where they worked as migrant workers in Glenwood Springs.

Virginia Castro met Richard Castro when they were both students at Metropolitan State College of Denver in 1967. "I didn't even know who he was, but I knew he was in a leadership position," she shared. After attending several meetings to organize Chicano students in the movement, the two got closer and were married in 1972. They attended University of Denver graduate schools together. Virginia Castro worked her way through school as a nurse and then spent several years inside Denver Public Schools as a social worker. Later, she became the supervisor of social work services. "I had a case load at work and then a case load at home," she chuckled referring to her five children.

Castro lived what he preached. He bought a house on the west side of Denver where there really wasn't much, but "junk yards and rental properties" Virginia Castro noted. Organizing the West Side Coalition, Castro tried to educate people as to why the system was flawed and how to fix it. Castro looked towards the capital and what happened behind closed doors to feel out who was in power and how to get adequate representation of Latinos. Not seeing what his people needed, he decided to be the change he desired for them.

The movement was so natural to the Castro family that they almost had to ignore the safety risks. "It was all very intense, you really didn't have time to stop and think that people could get hurt. It was a life; it was the way you lived your life," Virginia Castro said. Castro faced much danger during his life. He was beaten by police, shot on Santa Fe Drive and his house was bombed. He was elected into the Colorado House of Representatives five times and served for 10 years in human rights and community relations.

Castro would later be Denver Mayor Federico Peña's right hand man.

He was elected to the school board in the mid '80s. He was a Colorado state representative, first elected in 1974 at age 25. Castro was an early instructor in what would become the Chicana and Chicano Studies Department at Metropolitan State College of Denver, where he is honored by the Richard T. Castro Distinguished Visiting Professorship Castro was an opponent of the proposed "English Only" amendment, "Say it In English."

Castro once said, "Education's role in our society cannot be minimized...It is quite probably the most critical investment a people can make."

The Rich Castro Elementary School in Denver is named after him, as is the Richard T. Castro office Building at 1200 Federal Boulevard, Denver. A bust commemorating Castro, sculpted by noted Denver artist Emanuel Martinez, sits in the rotunda of the Colorado state capitol.
