= Red Rocks Community College =

Public college in Lakewood and Arvada, Colorado, US

- Latin: Ruber Saxa
- Former names: Community College of Denver, Red Rocks Campus (1969–1983)
- Type: Public community college
- Established: 1969
- Parent institution: Colorado Community College System
- Academic affiliations: Space-grant
- President: Landon Pirius
- Faculty: 99
- Students: 14,000 +
- Undergraduates: 6,035
- Location: Lakewood, Colorado, United States
- Campus: Urban, multiple sites
- Mascot: Fox
- Website: www.rrcc.edu

Red Rocks Community College (RRCC) is a public community college with two campuses located in Lakewood and Arvada, Colorado.

== History ==
RRCC was established in 1969 as part of the Colorado Community College System. As a campus of the Community College of Denver, RRCC opened at a temporary site until the Colorado legislature appropriated funds for construction of a permanent campus at the school's current Lakewood campus. Construction began in 1971 and the first phase of construction was completed in 1973, with a link between the east and west wings of the current building completed in fall 1975. On July 1, 1983, the Red Rocks campus officially became Red Rocks Community College. It opened its second campus in Arvada in 1990.

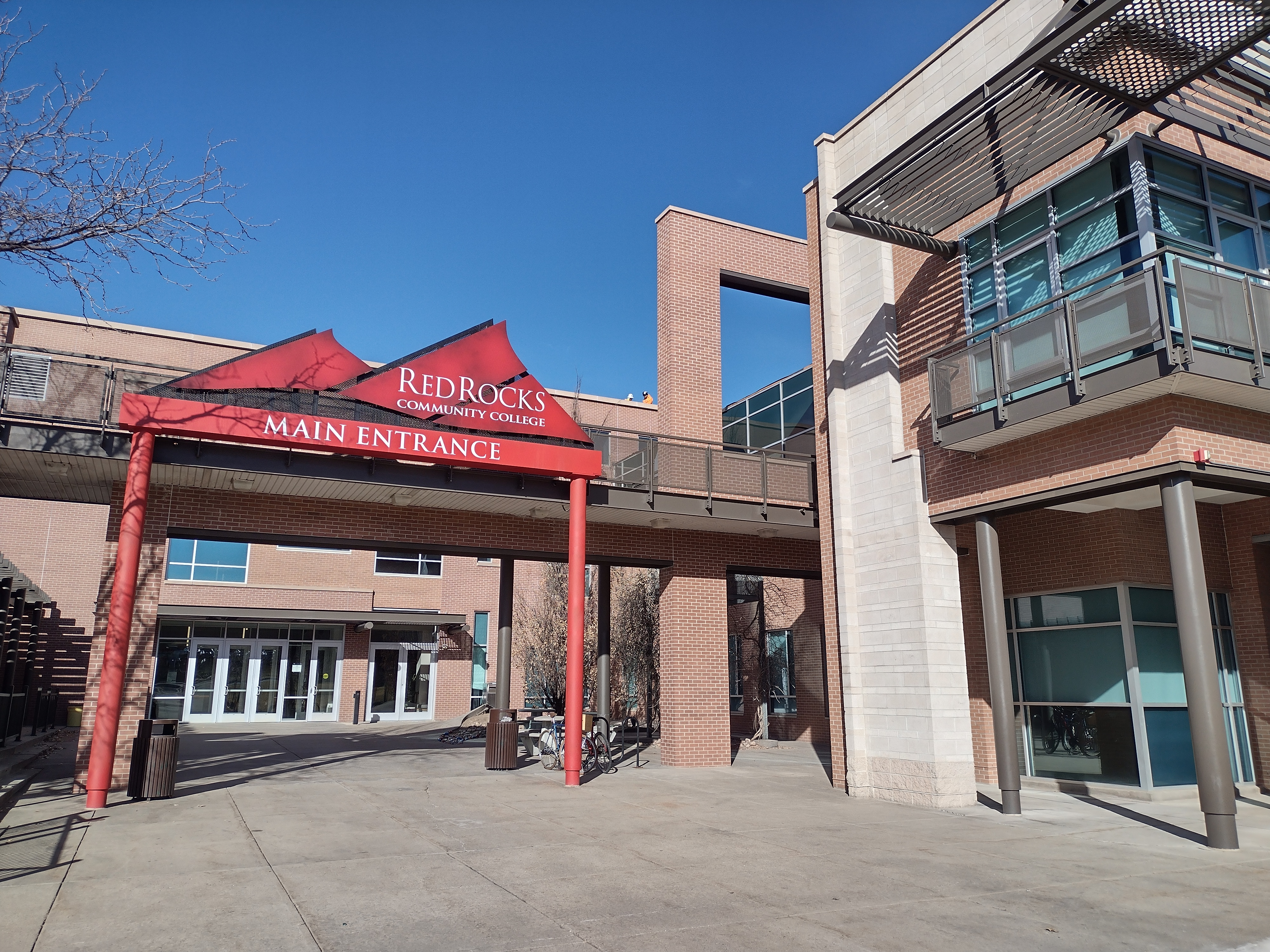
Red Rocks Community College Main Entrance, Lakewood, Colorado

Dr. Landon Pirius is the current and tenth president of RRCC and assumed duties in March 2024.

== Academics ==
The college offers Associate of Arts, Associate of Science, Associate of General Studies, Associate of Applied Science, Bachelor of Applied Science, Master of Physician's Assistant Studies degree programs as well as certificates.

RRCC is accredited by the Higher Learning Commission and the Commission on Accreditation of Allied Health Education Programs.

== Campuses ==
=== Lakewood ===
The main Lakewood campus (13300 W. 6th Ave, Lakewood, CO) is on 140 acres (0.57 km^{2}) in the foothills of Jefferson County, along Sixth Avenue between Indiana Street and Union Boulevard. Floor-to-ceiling windows provide views of the Front Range of the Rocky Mountains. The main building is a quarter-mile-long.

Campus features include an amphitheater, art gallery, bookstore, childcare center, cafeteria and cafe, labyrinth, library, recreation center, student food pantry, theater, community rooms, sand volleyball court, and tennis courts.

East Wing of Lakewood Campus

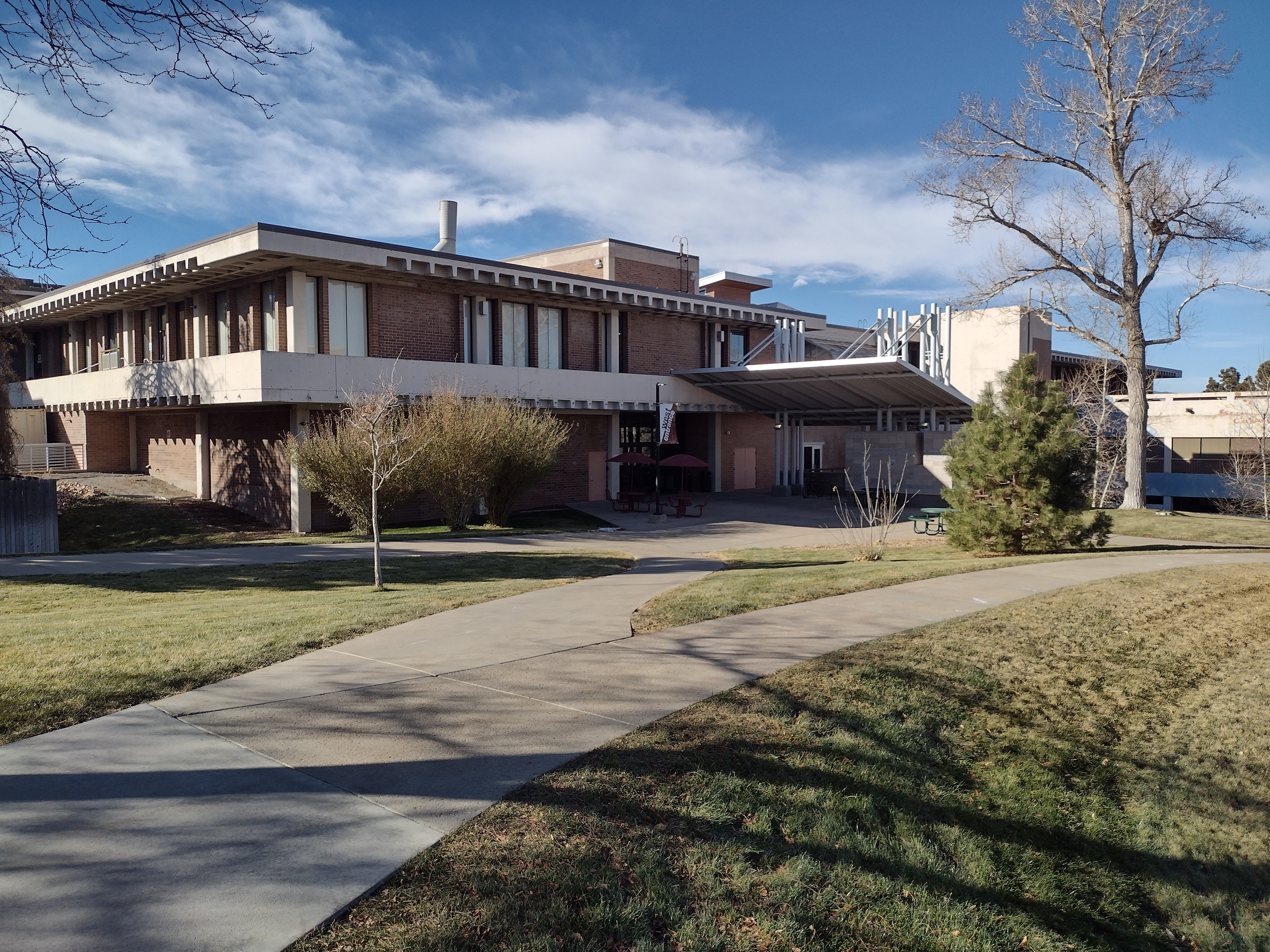
Red Rocks Community College West End Main Building, Lakewood, Colorado

=== Arvada ===
The Arvada campus (10280 W 55th Ave, Arvada, CO 80002) is on a hilltop northwest of the intersection of I-70 and Kipling in the suburban core of the Denver Metro. This campus provides general education credit along with more specialized studies in the health care industry.

Campus features include cadaver labs, fitness center, simulation labs, and student lounges.

Both campuses are serviced by the RTD (Regional Transportation District).

== Campus life ==
Red Rocks is one of Colorado's 13 community colleges. It is home to 14,000 students a year ranging from high school students taking early college courses, recent high school graduates beginning a bachelor's degree, established persons adding to professional knowledge or starting a brand new career, and retirees exploring courses for personal enjoyment.

Support services include free tutoring, advising, a child care center, services for students with disabilities, a fitness center, Learning and Resource Centers, English as a Second Language courses, student groups, student employment, and an LGBTQ+ center.

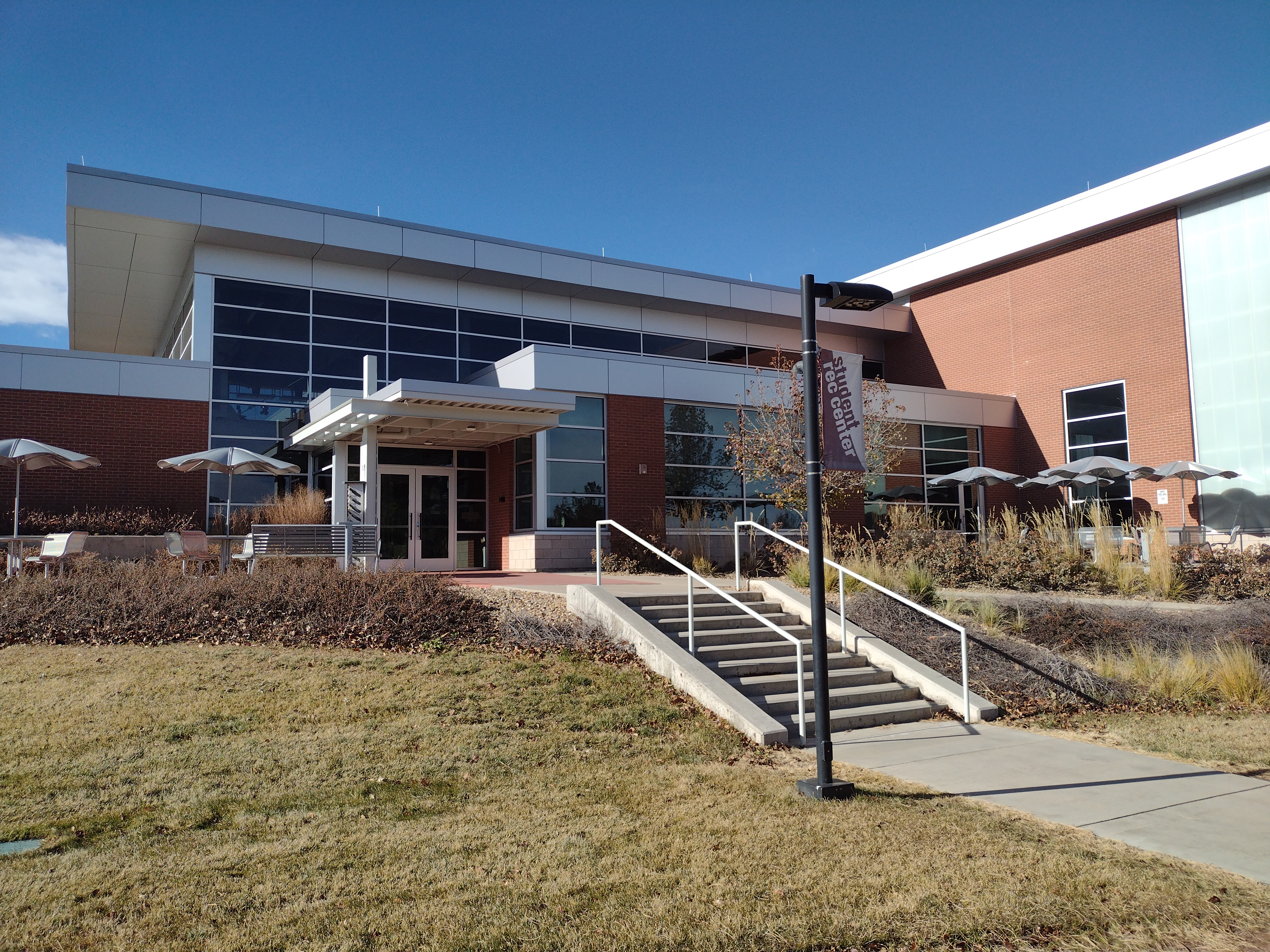
Red Rocks Community College Recreation Center

An active Student Center provides services and benefits such as discounted sports and movie tickets, campus events and entertainment, student clubs from anime to World of Warcraft, The school mascot is Copper, a red fox. FAX, copy services, a computer lab with internet access and free printing are available to all students.

== Red Rocks Community College Foundation ==
Red Rocks Community College Foundation (The RRCC Foundation) is a 501(c)(3) non-profit organization established in 1991. Their mission is to support Red Rocks Community College in its commitment to students, learning, and excellence. They have a Foundation Scholarship Program and are engaged in other program areas including Faculty Teaching Chairs, the Mini-Grants and Dr. Agneta Albinsson Grants, and the Employee Book Fund.

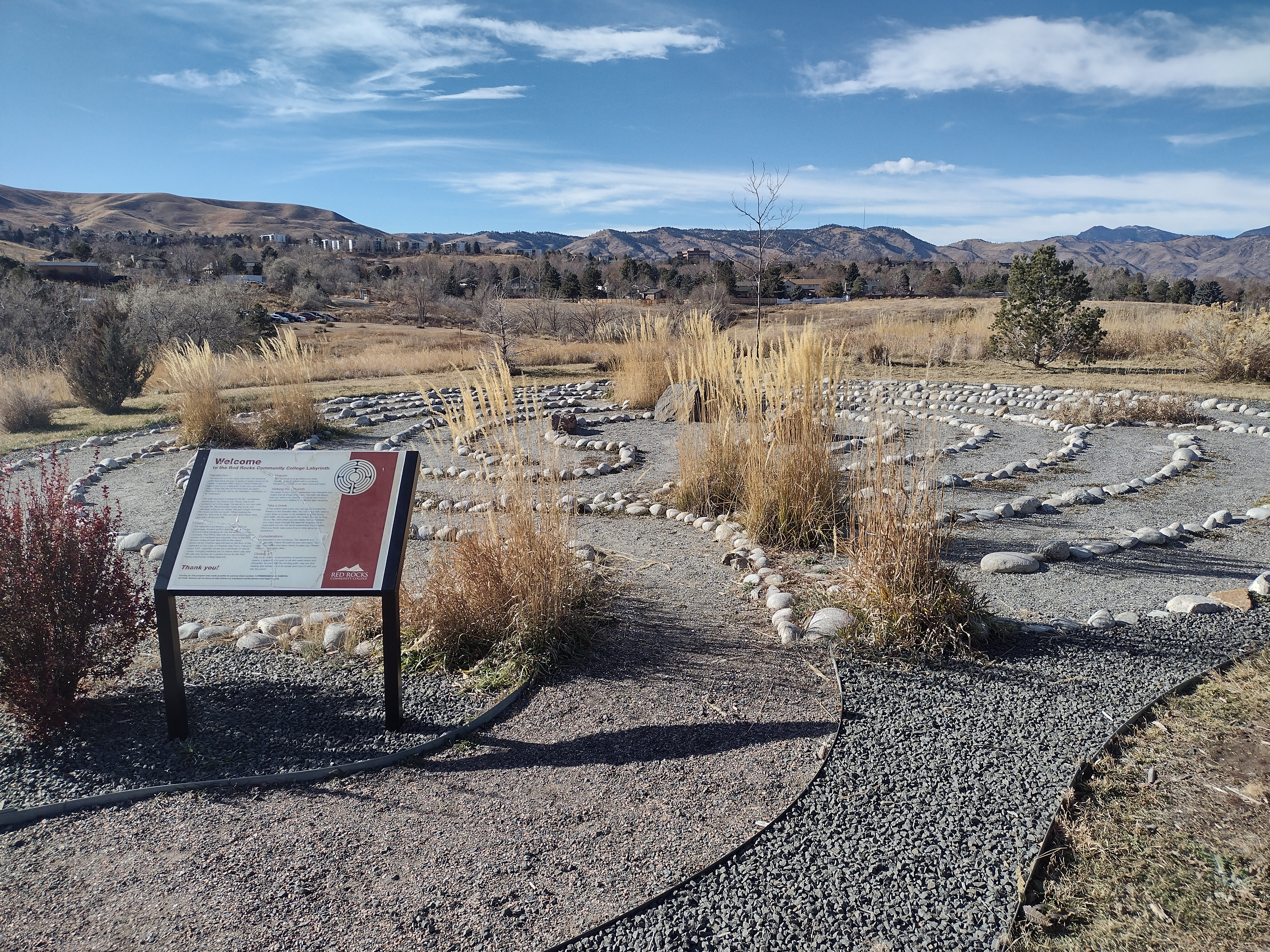
Red Rocks Community College Labyrinth

The RRCC Foundation Teaching Chair Program recognizes and awards outstanding faculty. Recipients are selected from full-time faculty following a portfolio review and initial screening by a panel of faculty representatives. The final selection is made by the RRCC Foundation Board of Directors. The program has awarded 21 Endowed Teaching Chairs in support of teaching excellence.

== Notable alumni ==
- Heather Armbrust, IFBB professional bodybuilder
- Ruben A. Valdez, Former Speaker of the Colorado House of Representatives
