= List of projects, centers, and institutes at Metropolitan State University of Denver =

Metropolitan State University of Denver is home to many projects, centers, and institutes.

== Projects, Centers, and Institutes ==
=== Art ===
- Center for Visual Art (CVA)
- Colorado Folk Arts Council

=== Business and Trade ===
- Center for Innovation

=== Education ===
- 2+2 Plan
- Alternative Licensure Program (ALP)
- Center for Improving Early Learning - Tools of the Mind (CIEL)
- Center for Individualized Learning
- College Assistance Migrant Program
- Family Center
- Family Literacy Program
- First Year Success Program
- Center for Urban Education (CUE)
- Honors Program
- Internship Center
- Student Academic Success Center (SASC)
- TRiO High School Upward Bound
- Veterans Upward Bound
- Writing Center

=== Health ===
- Counseling Center
- Health Center at Auraria
- Metro State Food Bank

=== History ===
- Welcome to Camp Hale

=== Humanities ===
- Language & Cultural Institute

=== Public Policy and Service ===
- Center for Urban Connections (CUC)
- The Golda Meir Center for Political Leadership (Golda)
- Hispanic Leadership Development
- Army ROTC

=== Regional Issues ===
- Equity Assistance Center (EAC), Region VIII
- Institute for Women's Studies & Services (IWSS)

=== Science ===
- Center for Math, Science, and Environmental Education (CMSEE)
- Surveying and Mapping Program
- One World, One Water Center for Urban Water Education and Stewardship (OWOW Center)
- Strides Towards Encouraging Professions in Science

== See also ==
- Metropolitan State University of Denver
  - Auraria Campus
