= Colorado Community Colleges Online =

Online college course system in Colorado

Colorado Community Colleges Online is part of the Colorado Community College System. It provides online courses, development, and support for the other community colleges in the system.
