= Barron Field =

Barron Field Camp Taliaferro Field #2
- Everman, Texas
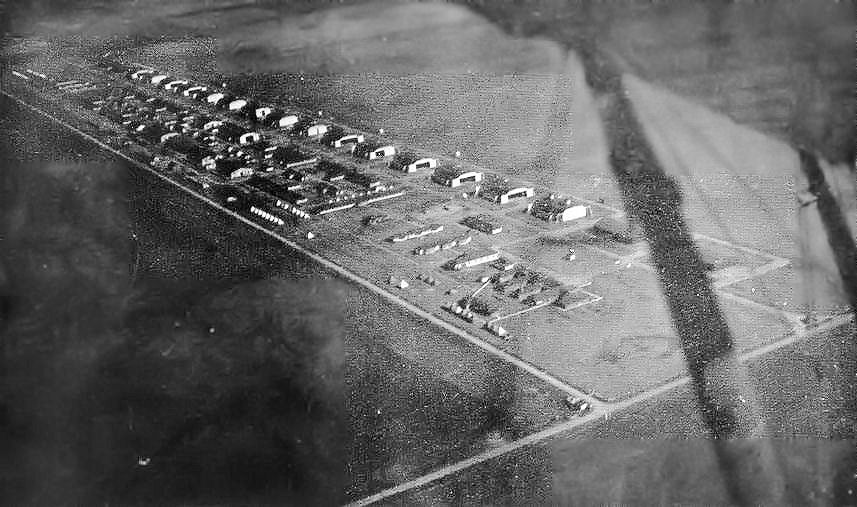
- Barron Field, Texas, 1918

Site information
- Type: Pilot training airfield
- Controlled by: Royal Flying Corps (1917); Air Service, United States Army (1918-1921)
- Condition: Redeveloped into urban area

Location
- Location within Texas
- Coordinates: 32°37′26″N 97°18′24″W

Site history
- Built: 1917
- In use: 1917–1921
- Battles/wars: World War I

Garrison information
- Garrison: Training Section, Air Service

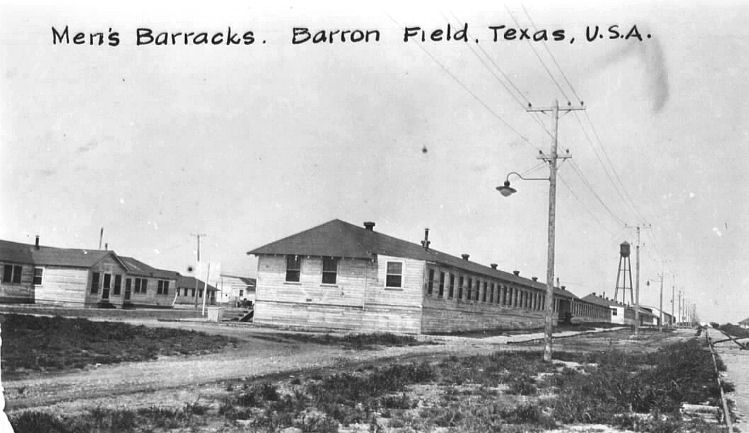
Men's Barracks, 1918.

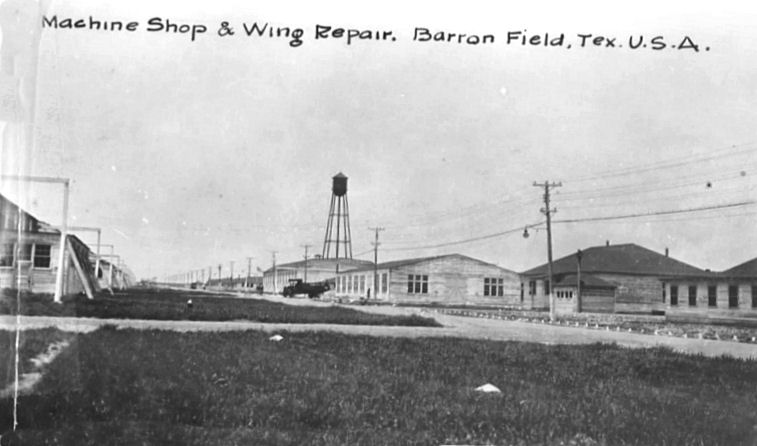
Machine Shop & Wing Repair, 1918

Barron Field (Camp Taliaferro Field #2) is a former World War I military airfield, located 1.0 mile (1.6 km) West-southwest of Everman, Texas. It operated as a training field for the Air Service, United States Army between 1917 until 1921. It was one of thirty-two Air Service training camps established after the United States entry into World War I in April 1917.

After the United States' entry into World War I in April 1917, General John J. "Blackjack" Pershing invited the British Royal Flying Corps to establish training fields in Texas for the training of American and Canadians volunteers because of its mild weather. After looking at sites in Dallas, Fort Worth, Waco, Austin, Wichita Falls and Midland, three sites were established in 1917 in the Fort Worth vicinity (known as the "Flying Triangle."), those being Hicks Field (#1), Barron Field (#2), and Benbrook Field (#3).

Canadians named the training complex Camp Taliaferro after Walter Taliaferro, a US aviator who had been killed in an accident. Camp Taliaferro was headquartered under the direction of the Air Service, United States Army, which had an administration center near what is now the Will Rodgers Memorial Center in Fort Worth, Texas.

== History ==
Taliafero Field No. 2 was used by the Royal Flying Corps from October 1917 to April 1918 as a training field for American and Canadian pilots. It was then turned over to the Air Service, United States Army. The Americans renamed the field Barron Field after Cadet R. J. Barron, who was drowned at Chandler Field, Pennsylvania on 22 August 1917 when the airplane he was flying fell into the water.

=== World War I ===
Construction on Taliaferro Field #2 began in September 1917, with the first trainees arriving in November to a very crude facility. Most structures were unfinished and personnel lived and worked in canvas tents. It was taken over by the United States Army in February 1918 and renamed Barron Field on 1 May for Cadet Robert J. Barron, on 1 May 1918 who was killed at another flying school.

The Curtiss JN-4 "Jenny" became the primary aircraft used for flight training after the Army takeover. Eventually, the base expanded to 600 acres, housing as many as 150 officers and 900 enlisted men. Barron Field saw flight training and daredevil stunting by the likes of Ormer Locklear, and other pioneer barnstorming pilots, sending six squadrons of pilots to France before the war ended in November 1918.

Squadrons assigned to Barron Field:

- Post Headquarters, Taliaferro Field #2, 1 February 1918

Re-designated Post Headquarters, Barron Field, 1 May 1918-April 1919

- 77th Aero Squadron (II), May 1918

Re-designated Squadron "A", July–November 1918

- 106th Aero Squadron (II), March 1918

Re-designated Squadron "B", July–November 1918

- 207th Aero Squadron (II), April 1918

Re-designated: Squadron "C", July 1918; Transferred September 1918 to Call Field, Texas

- 273d Aero Squadron, February 1918

Re-designated Squadron "D", July–November 1918

- Flying School Detachment, November 1918-March 1919

Formed from elements of Squadrons A, B, C, D

Service Squadrons trained at Barron Field:

- 351st Aero Squadron (Service), March–July 1918; Deployed to American Expeditionary Forces. France
- 353d Aero Squadron (Service), May–July 1918; Deployed to American Expeditionary Forces. France

After the war ended, the base was closed in April 1919 and was used as an Army storage depot. Military use ended in 1921, and the facility was eventually dismantled and returned to farmland. Over the years, the southern suburbs of Fort Worth have expanded over the area, the airfield now is indistinguishable from the urbanized area. Barron Field was located south of Everman Parkway and west of Oak Grove Road. One small building, used for munitions, has survived, and today a Texas historical marker is located at the site on the west side of Oak Grove Road.

== See also ==
- List of Training Section Air Service airfields
