= Morgan Community College =

Community college in Fort Morgan, Colorado, U.S.

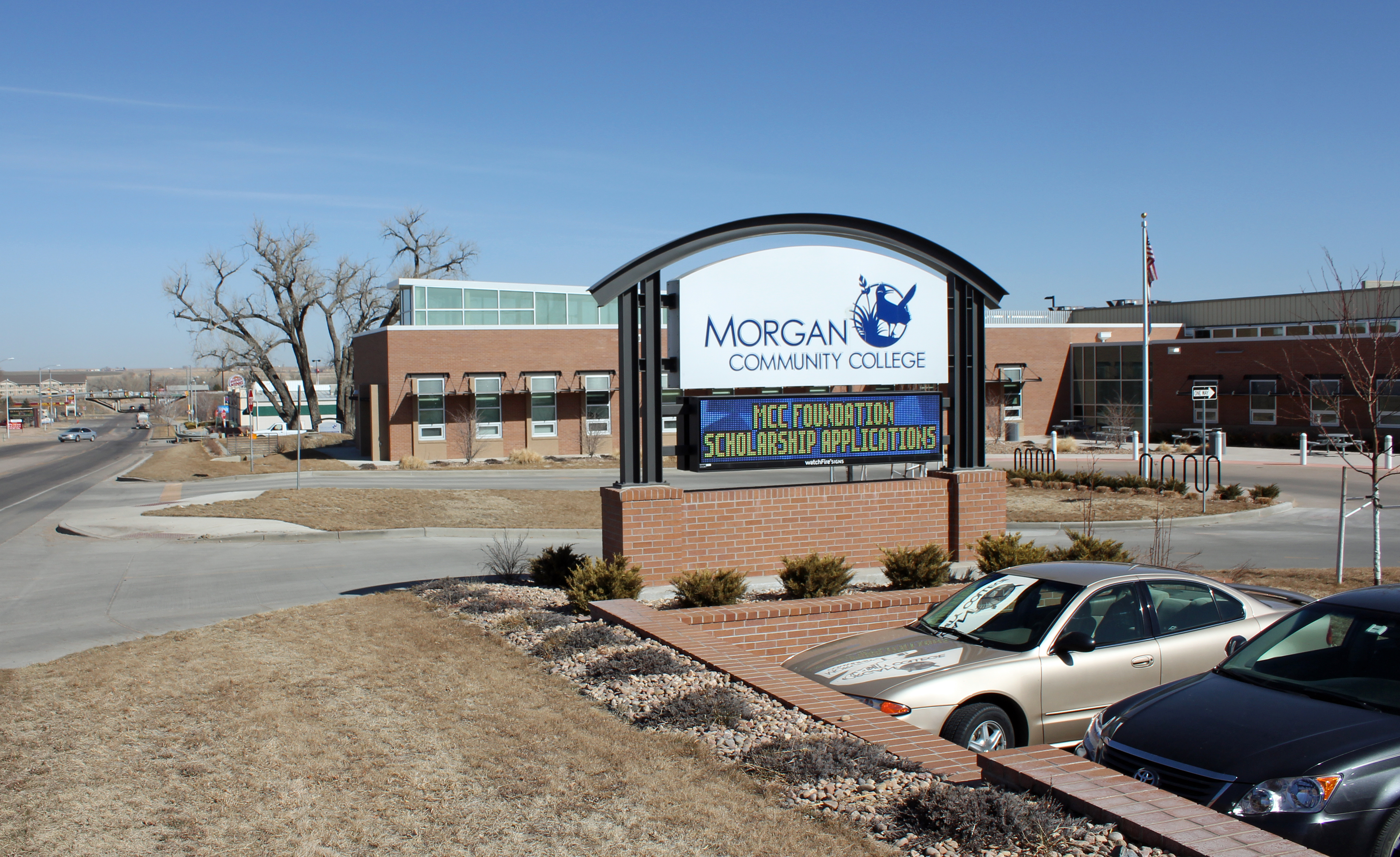
- A view of the front entrance to the main campus in Fort Morgan. The view is to the north, and Interstate-76 can be seen in the distance.
- Motto: Imagine. Believe. Achieve.
- Type: Public
- Established: 1970
- President: Curt Freed
- Location: Fort Morgan, Colorado, United States
- Website: www.morgancc.edu

Morgan Community College (MCC) is a community college in Fort Morgan, Colorado. It is a member of the Colorado Community College System. The college is accredited by The Higher Learning Commission of the North Central Association of Colleges and Schools.

== Campus ==
The main campus is located at 920 Barlow Road in Fort Morgan, close to the Fort Morgan Wal-Mart. The campus has six main buildings, all named after trees: Aspen Hall, Cedar Hall, Elm Hall, Spruce Hall, Cottonwood Hall, and Birch Hall.

== Regional centers ==
The college serves a large area of Colorado's eastern plains and has regional centers in Bennett, Burlington, Limon, and Wray.
