= Everman Joe C. Bean High School =

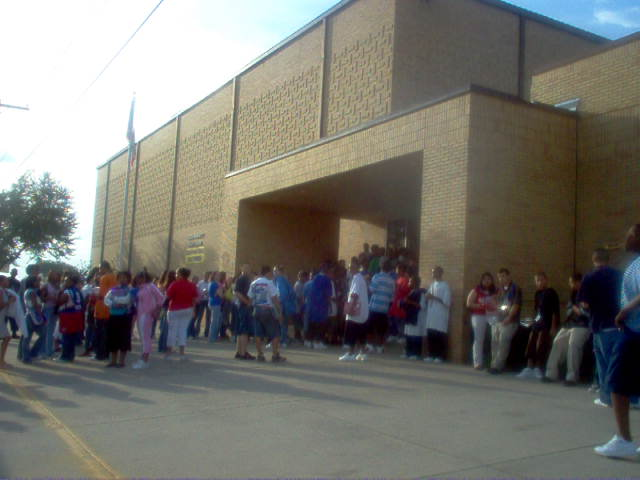
- Everman High School, EHS

Location
- 1000 Race Street Drive; Everman, Texas, Texas 76140; United States; 32.6198°N 97.2885°W

Information
- Other name: Everman High School, EHS
- School type: Public High School
- Motto: One Goal ... One Purpose ... Student Success
- School district: Everman Independent School District
- Principal: Ronald Pugh
- Staff: 106.82 (FTE)
- Grades: 9-12
- Enrollment: 1,740 (2022–23)
- Student to teacher ratio: 16.29
- Campus type: Suburban
- Colors: Purple and Gold
- Athletics: 13 Sports
- Athletics conference: 5A Region II District 9
- Mascot: Bulldog
- Website: jcb.eisd.org/o/jcbhs

Everman Joe C. Bean High School (commonly referred to as Everman, Everman High School, and EHS and also E-Block) is a public secondary school located in Everman, Texas (a suburb south of Fort Worth, Texas). The school is a part of the Everman Independent School District (commonly referred to as Everman ISD) and serves students in grades 9-12. The school mascot is the Bulldog, and school colors are purple and gold.

Everman High School houses students in grades 9-12. Most of the grade 9 classes are taught in the Jefferson Davis, Jr. Ninth Grade Center, which opened to the west of the existing campus in January 2008.

== History ==
Everman High School started out as part of the Everman School in the 1900s. It was a grade school, middle school, and high school for the children of Everman, Texas (then known as the community of Enon). The Everman School building is now Hommel Elementary School.

Everman High School was built in the 1950s and is still in use today. In the 1990s, Everman High School was renamed Everman Joe C. Bean High School after Joe C. Bean (former Everman Independent School District principal and superintendent).

Kathy Culbertson began her term as principal in 2003 at around age 26. The 2006 Texas Education Agency (TEA) accountability rating was unacceptable because the passing rate for African-American students was 33% for mathematics and 32% for science. TEA rules specify that if a racial group fails the tests, the entire school's rating is unacceptable. That year Principal Kathy Culbertson called attention to African-American students specifically over the public intercom. Two weeks later she left her position; she received criticism for using the intercom to call attention to it. Jeri Pfeifer, the superintendent of Everman ISD, stated that Culbertson chose to resign in lieu of reassignment due to a desire to avoid being a "divisive element". Curtis Amos, initially scheduled to be the principal of Powell Intermediate School, was appointed to replace her.

== Demographics ==
In 2006, 59% of the students were black.

== Sports ==
Everman High School offers a variety of sports programs and dance ensembles. Current sports offered are Baseball, Basketball, Cross Country, Football, Powerlifting, Soccer, Softball, Tennis, Track, and Volleyball.

=== Basketball ===
Everman is home of the 2003 Texas 3A State Boys Basketball champions. The team defeated Aransas Pass High School (86-58) in the semi-finals and Tatum High School (72-44) in the finals. In 1997-1998 Everman's boys basketball team became the first non Class 5A school in Texas to be rated in the USA Today National Top 25 Poll starting out the season at 25-0 (at the time Everman was UIL Class 4A). Everman's boys basketball team has also notched a State Tournament appearance in the 1950s and has advanced to the Regional Finals a total of four times and the Regional Semi-Finals seven times in school history. The girl's teams at EHS have not had the same level of success as the boys teams as they have not won a playoff game since the 1980s before finally winning a playoff game during the 2010 season.

=== Track ===
Everman High School won the UIL 3A Girls Track & Field Team Champions Championship under head coach Steve Beggs in 2001. The girls track team beat out competing high schools with 50 points. In 1995 Everman won the UIL 4A Boys Track and Field Championship beating out Dallas Lincoln and Brenham with 38 points.

Among individual/relay state title winners in track and field:

Boys

1973 Fred Duevall High Jump (Class 3A)

1980 Leslie Brooks 400m dash (Class 3A)

1983 Kevin Robinzine 400m dash (Class 4A)

1984 Kevin Robinzine 400m dash (Class 4A)

1994 Boys 4x400 Relay Champions (Class 4A)

1994 Shane Stewart Pole Vault

Girls

1999 Licretia Sibley 400m dash (Class 4A)

2001 Licretia Sibley 400m dash (Class 3A)

2001 Girls 4x100 Relay Champions (Class 3A)

2001 Girls 4x400 Relay Champions (Class 3A)

=== Baseball ===
Everman has produced two players who have spent time in the professional ranks. They played in the state tournament in 1984, losing to Austin Westlake in the State Semi-Finals.

=== Football ===
Everman's football program started in the late 1950s and had immediate success, winning three straight district titles from 1960-1962. However, from 1963-1978 EHS posted just one winning season (8-2 in 1972). Everman's football fortunes turned around starting in 1979 with a 7-2-1 record and in 1984 the Bulldogs posted a perfect 10-0 record winning their first district title in 22 years. Since 1979 Everman has had a history of football success posting just four losing seasons (1990, 1996, 1998, 2012). Most of Everman's football success has been under Dale Keeling, who has been head coach since 1998.

The Everman High School football team has won two Class 3A state football championships [2001 and 2002]. Everman defeated Sinton High School 25-14 at Texas A&M University to win the 2001 title; Everman trailed 14-6 at halftime but outscored Sinton 19-0 in the second half for the win. Everman finished the season with a perfect 15-0 record.

In 2002, Everman finished the season 14-1 and won their second straight state title beating Burnet High School 35-14 at the Alamodome in San Antonio. That Burnet team featured a pair of future NFL players in QB Stephen McGee and WR Jordan Shipley. In the first quarter, Everman DB Corey Fulbright suffered paralysis while making a tackle on a Burnet player. Fulbright underwent emergency surgery at Brook Army Medical Center in San Antonio to save his life. He was paralyzed from the neck down as a result of the injury.

In 2007, the football team was named Class 4A district champions after going undefeated in the regular season and going 14-1, but eventually losing in the semi-finals, where they played Highland Park High School and lost 13-42. (Highland Park High School later lost to Lake Travis High School).

In 2008, the Bulldogs went 14-1 again but on Saturday December 13, 2008, Everman lost 47-34 to Sulphur Springs High School at Texas Stadium. Sulphur Springs High School was behind in the first quarter but began to take over in the last three quarters. Sulphur Springs would win the Class 4A State Championship the next week. Everman again had a strong season in 2009 advancing to the Class 4A Division II semi-finals before falling to Aledo 35-22. The Bulldogs would finish the season at 11-3.

After a few years of limited success between 2010 and 2013, Everman football has rebounded in 2014 and 2015 advancing to the Class 5A Division II quarter-finals in back-to-back seasons.

=== Powerlifting ===
Powerlifting is a relatively new sport at Everman but the Bulldogs are among the state's elite programs, winning boys Division I THSPA titles in 2006 (shared with Odessa High), 2007, and 2014.

== Dale Keeling Field House ==
Construction for the Dale Keeling Field House was completed in 2009. The new field house is named after Dale Keeling, Everman ISD's former director of athletics and Everman High School's former head football coach. The estimated construction cost of the site is $5,275,000. The site sits on the northern end zone of J.E. Marr Stadium (Located behind Everman High School). This field house was dedicated to Dale Keeling.

== Notable alumni ==
- Ellis Burks - A 1982 graduate of Everman High School, Burks spent 18 seasons in the Major Leagues hitting .291 and hitting 352 career home runs.
- Andre President - American football player
- Kevin Robinzine - A 1984 graduate of Everman High School, Robinzine won back to back UIL state titles in the 4A Boys 400m dash he then ran the anchor leg for Southern Methodist University's national champion 4x400 relay team in 1986. In the 1988 Seoul Olympics he was part of the gold medal winning United States men's 4x400 relay team, Robinzine ran the third leg.
- Barron Wortham - A 1989 graduate of Everman High School, Wortham played college football at UTEP and was named WAC defensive player of the year in 1993. Wortham spent 7 seasons in the NFL with the Houston Oilers, Tennessee Titans and Dallas Cowboys.
