= Northeastern Junior College =

Community college in Sterling, Colorado, US

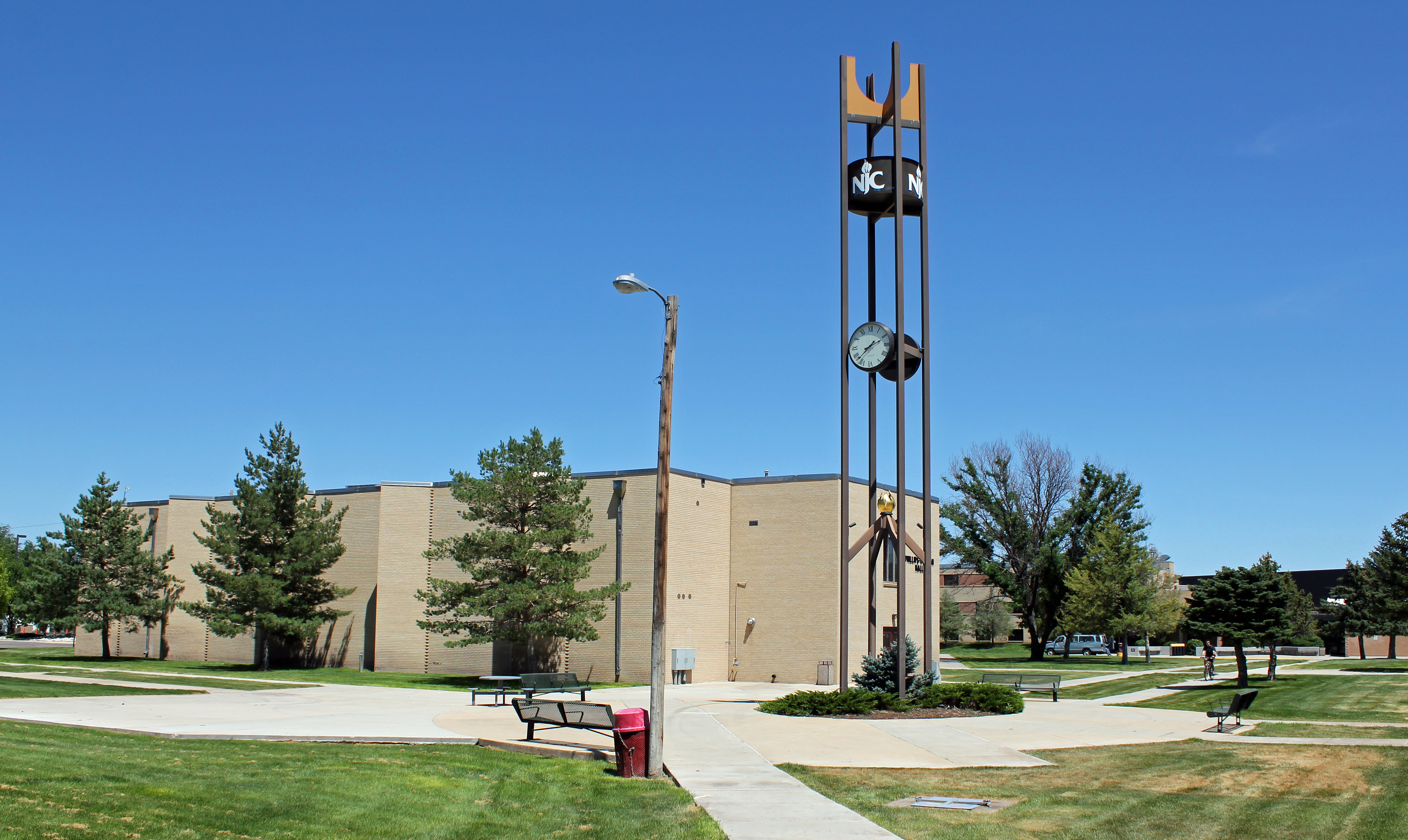
- A view of the central quad, including the clock tower.
- Type: Public community college
- Established: 1941
- Parent institution: Colorado Community College System
- President: Mike White
- Students: 1,446 (fall 2022)
- Location: Sterling, Colorado, United States
- Mascot: Plainsmen
- Website: www.njc.edu

Northeastern Junior College (NJC) is a public community college in Sterling, Colorado. It is a member college of the Colorado Community College System.

== Academics ==
The college offers over 80 programs of study, with classes held at the campus or online. In addition to traditional course offerings, the college offers classes in agriculture, cosmetology, nursing, and wind energy technology.

== Campus ==
The main campus is on the northern side of Sterling, Colorado. Buildings on the campus include the Event Center, which includes the Jackson Edwards Arena, where sporting and concert events are held, and a fitness center. The campus also includes a number of dormitories, and it has a bookstore and the Monahan Library. The Hays Student Center functions as the campus' student union.

== Athletics ==
NJC offers team sports in baseball, men's and women's basketball, golf, rodeo, softball, men's and women's soccer, Livestock Judging, volleyball and wrestling.

== Notable alumni ==
- Steve Howey, actor
- Dalton Knecht, professional basketball player
- Wellington Webb, former mayor of Denver
- Jose Z. Calderon, Community-based sociologist, educator, author, and organizer.
