= Lamar Community College =

Public college in Lamar, Colorado, US

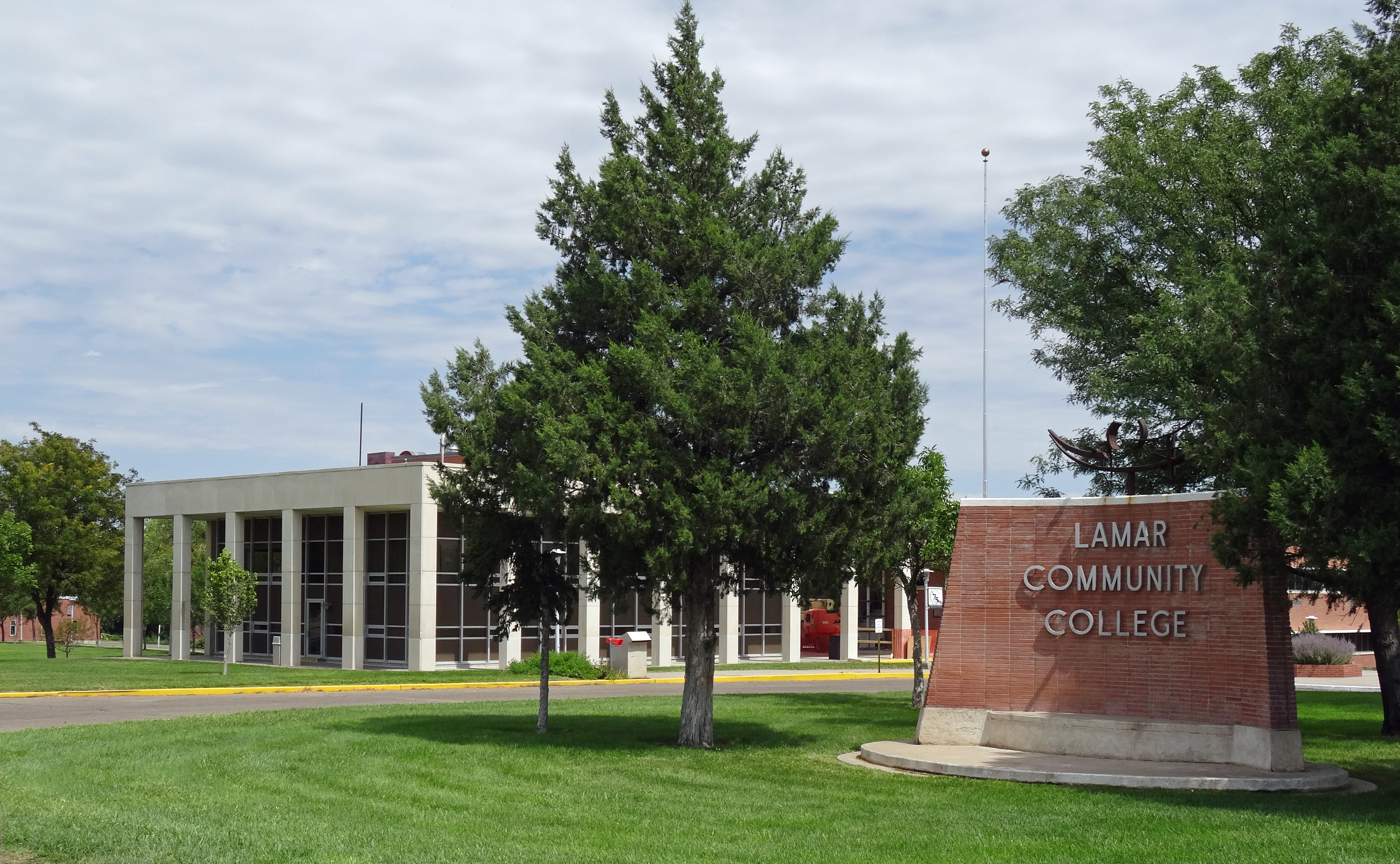
- Former names: Junior College of Southeastern Colorado (1937–1946); Lamar Junior College (1946–1965)
- Type: Public community college
- Established: 1937
- Parent institution: Colorado Community College System
- President: Rosana Reyes
- Location: Lamar, Colorado, United States; 38°04′13″N 102°37′00″W
- Campus: 115 acres (47 ha)
- Nickname: Runnin’ Lopes
- Website: www.lamarcc.edu

Lamar Community College (LCC) is a public community college in Lamar, Colorado. It was founded in 1937. In fall 2023, the college's enrollment was 711, making LCC the smallest member of the Colorado Community College System.

== History ==
The college was founded as the Junior College of Southeastern Colorado in 1937. The original building still stands at Eighth Street and Walnut. It became Lamar Junior College with the creation of a new district in 1946 and changed to Lamar Community College in 1965. It became a member of the Colorado Community College System, formerly known as the State System of Community Colleges in 1968.

With a large campus, it is home to several instructional buildings, residence hall/cafeteria, Wellness Center, and Equine Complex.

== Campus ==
The college occupies 115 acres (47 ha) on the southern edge of the City of Lamar on Highway 287.

== Organization and administration ==
The college is part of the Colorado Community College System. Despite its relative size, it serves a large primary service area of Prowers (Lamar is county seat), Baca, Cheyenne, and Kiowa Counties, in southeastern Colorado, United States and attracts students from across the US and internationally through its offerings and international student program.

== Athletics ==
The college athletic teams are nicknamed the Runnin’ Lopes. Lamar hosts five NJCAA Division I sports (men's baseball, men's and women's basketball, men's Golf, women's softball, and women's volleyball), co-ed National Intercollegiate Rodeo Association team, and a club men's soccer team. Both LCC's men's baseball and basketball teams have risen to prominence in the region in the last decade.

== Notable people ==
- Doug Brocail, professional baseball player
- Brandon McCarthy, professional baseball player and manager
- Andre President, professional football player
