= Community College of Aurora =

Public college in Aurora, Colorado, US

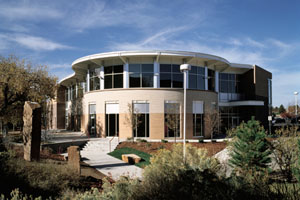
- CCA's Student Centre Rotunda, CentreTech Campus, Aurora, Colorado
- Motto: Start Smart, Start Strong.
- Type: Public community college
- Established: 1983; 43 years ago
- Parent institution: Colorado Community College System
- Academic affiliations: Space-grant
- President: Mordecai Brownlee
- Students: 8,343 (fall 2022)
- Location: Aurora, Colorado, United States
- Campus: CentreTech Campus in Aurora, Colorado and Lowry Campus at the former Lowry Air Force Base
- Website: www.ccaurora.edu

The Community College of Aurora (CCA) is a public community college in Aurora, Colorado. It is part of the Colorado Community College System. CCA serves over 10,000 students annually at its CentreTech Campus in Aurora; Lowry Campus at the former Lowry Air Force Base; and through online classes.

== History ==
Efforts to establish a college in Aurora began with a group of Aurora citizens in the early 1950s with the college founded in 1983.

In 2017, the college was placed on a censure list issued by the American Association of University Professors after what they claimed was an improper firing of an instructor.

== Accreditation ==
Community College of Aurora is accredited by The Higher Learning Commission of the North Central Association of Colleges and Schools.
