= Everman, Texas =

- City
- City of Everman
- Location of Everman in Tarrant County, Texas
- Coordinates: 32°37′30″N 97°17′03″W
- Country: United States
- State: Texas
- County: Tarrant

Area
  - Total: 1.76 sq mi (4.57 km^{2})
  - Land: 1.76 sq mi (4.56 km^{2})
  - Water: 0.0039 sq mi (0.01 km^{2})
- Elevation: 646 ft (197 m)

Population (2020)
  - Total: 6,154
  - Estimate (2025): 6,537
  - Density: 3,500/sq mi (1,350/km^{2})
- Time zone: UTC-6 (CST)
  - Summer (DST): UTC-5 (CDT)
- ZIP code: 76140
- Area code: 817
- FIPS code: 48-24912
- GNIS feature ID: 2410470
- Website: www.evermantx.us

Everman is a city in Tarrant County, Texas, United States. Its population was 6,154 in the 2020 census, an increase over the figure of 6,108 tabulated in 2010.

== History ==
Everman is an incorporated residential community on the southern edge of Fort Worth near Interstate 820 in southeastern Tarrant County. Members of the Kiowa, Apache, and Wichita tribes inhabited the area until the arrival of Anglo-Americans in the early to middle 1850s. A hamlet named Oak Grove existed in the area for several years. A small community to the east of present-day Everman was known as Enon. The "Enon" community name had been taken from the Bible. They had a doctor's office, a drug store, and a general store.

Upon the arrival of the International – Great Northern Railroad in 1902, the more established community of Everman Village was developed. The town moved closer to the railway, which was convenient because it gave the citizens transportation and a means to ship freight both to Houston and to Fort Worth, the nearest city. It was much easier and more pleasant to ride the train than to ride a horse, buggy, or wagon. The people named this new community Everman after John Wesley Everman, the man who was the head of the surveying party that platted the town site. A native of Philadelphia, he came to Texas as an engineer for the IGN Railroad and eventually became the general superintendent and assistant general manager for the Texas and Pacific Railway Company. He died in Dallas in 1946 at the age of 85. The names of some of his descendants still appear in the Fort Worth telephone book, though none live in the city of Everman. The original streets were named after the men who were in that survey party: Noble, Trammell, Trice, Parker, and Hansbarger. Enon Street was named after the first settlement. After the railroad was established, the town put up a cotton gin and started a land office business.

In 1905, postal service to the settlement began, and in 1906, Everman established an independent school district. In 1917, the community was one of three sites selected to serve as a flight-training school for the Canadian Royal Flying Corps and the United States Signal Corps, Aviation Section. Barron Field, just outside the city, stimulated the local economy and increased population growth. In 1976, the Everman Garden Club obtained a Texas Historical Marker for the Barron Munitions Building, which after the war had served as a schoolhouse for African-American schoolchildren.

By the mid-1920s Everman had eight businesses and an estimated population of 138. In 1924, a fire destroyed the bank, a lodge hall that was over the bank, and a grocery store.

An election was held on July 7, 1945, launching the City of Everman. On August 25, 1945, a mayor, a marshal, and five aldermen were elected. W. A. Wilson was the first mayor of Everman, and the first marshal was Buster Stephenson. The five aldermen were W. B. Dwiggins, Jack Neill, Clyde Pittman, Howard Easter and J. W. Bishop. Everman was on her way to becoming a city, but water was needed. Bonds were sold to build a public water supply system, and a volunteer fire department was organized. The city's water was first furnished by Claude Vaughan's well.

In 1948, the name changed from the Village of Everman to the City of Everman. In 1966, another big fire struck in Everman. This time, the town lost the post office, a drug store, and a cafe. The businesses rebuilt in another location. After the nearby Dallas/Fort Worth International Airport was constructed, the number of residents in Everman increased to more than 5,000 by the mid-1970s. Everman adopted the council-manager form of city government in 1986.

== Geography ==
According to the United States Census Bureau, the city has a total area of 1.8 square miles (4.6 km^{2}), of which 0.01 square miles (0.03 km^{2}), or 0.69%, is covered by water.

== Demographics ==
Historical population
Census	Pop.	Note	%±
1950	451		—
1960	1,076		138.6%
1970	4,570		324.7%
1980	5,387		17.9%
1990	5,672		5.3%
2000	5,836		2.9%
2010	6,108		4.7%
2020	6,154		0.8%
2025 (est.)	6,537		6.2%
U.S. Decennial Census

Everman racial composition as of 2020 (NH = Non-Hispanic) (Note: Note: the US Census treats Hispanic/Latino as an ethnic category. This table excludes Latinos from the racial categories and assigns them to a separate category. Hispanics/Latinos can be of any race.)
Race	Number	Percentage
White (NH)	1,125	18.28%
Black or African American (NH)	1,203	19.55%
Native American or Alaska Native (NH)	8	0.13%
Asian (NH)	29	0.47%
Some other race (NH)	18	0.29%
Mixed/multiracial (NH)	116	1.88%
Hispanic or Latino	3,655	59.39%
Total	6,154	

As of the 2020 United States census, 6,154 people, 2,126 households, and 1,396 families resided in the city.

== Education ==
The city of Everman is served by the Everman Independent School District, with five elementary schools (kindergarten-grade 4), two intermediate schools (grades 5–6), one junior high school, and two high schools. Everman Joe C. Bean High School is home to the 2001 and 2002 Texas 3A state football champions and the Texas 3A state boys' basketball champions.

== Notable people ==
- Ellis Burks, Major League Baseball player
- Steven Wayne Smith, former Texas Supreme Court justice who served from 2002 to 2005, was reared in Everman.
