= Community College of Denver =

Public college in Denver, Colorado, US

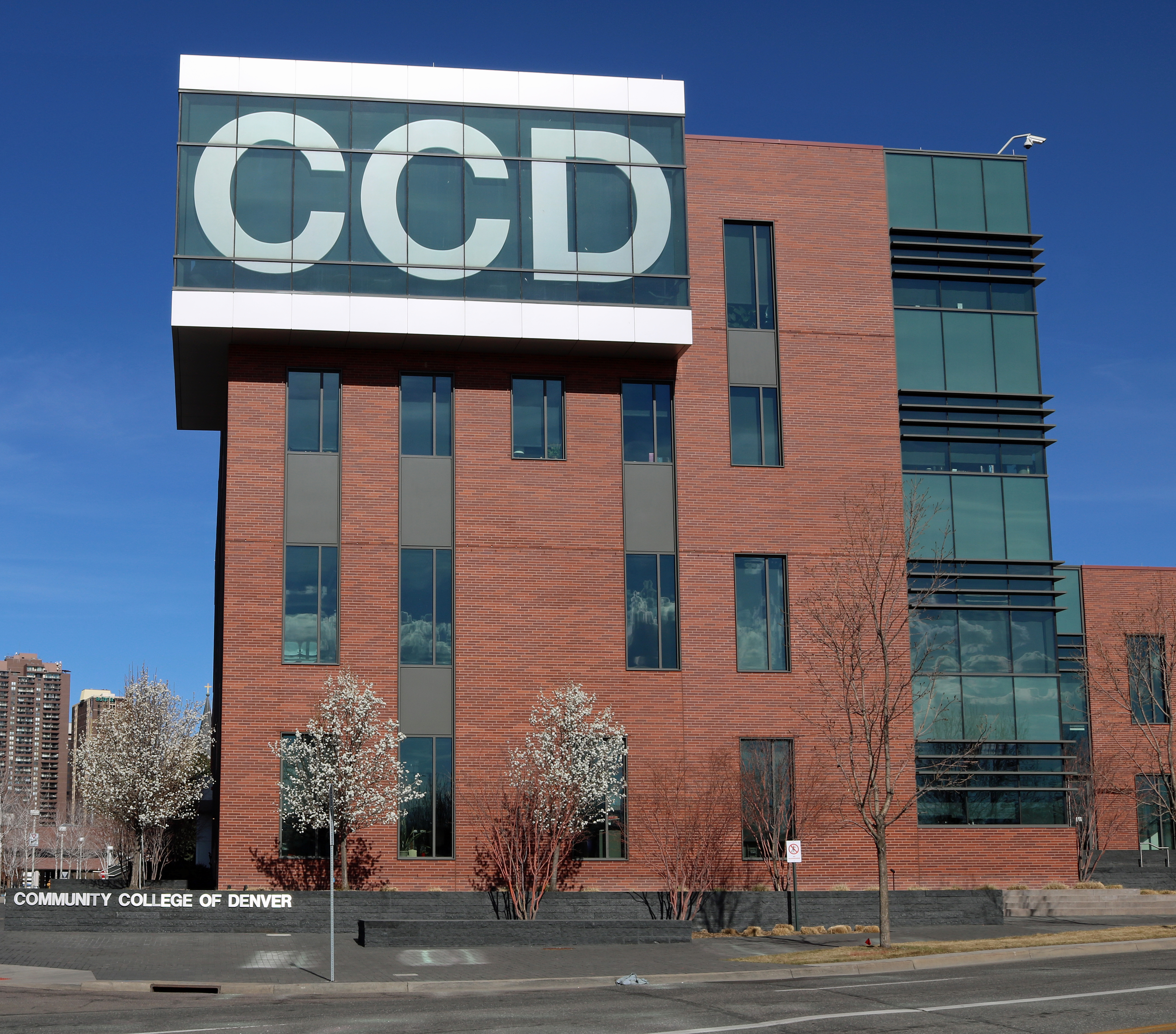
- CCD's Confluence Building on the Auraria Campus.
- Other name: CCD
- Motto: Explore. Experience. Engage.
- Type: Public community college
- Established: 1967; 59 years ago
- Parent institution: Colorado Community College System
- Academic affiliations: Space-grant
- President: Marielena DeSanctis
- Faculty: 121 full-time
- Students: 8,032
- Location: Denver and Aurora, Colorado, United States; 39°44′27.49″N 105°0′10.14″W
- Campus: Urban
- Colors: Purple, gold, and white
- Nickname: CityHawks
- Website: www.ccd.edu

Community College of Denver (CCD) is a public community college in Denver, Colorado. The main campus is at Auraria Campus and it has two other locations in the Denver metropolitan area. CCD focuses on underserved, first-generation, and minority students.

CCD is one of 13 colleges in the Colorado Community College System. The college offers over 100 degree and certification options, including workforce training, career planning and transfer to other state schools. It is the only two-year college in the nation that shares a campus and facilities with two four-year universities, Metropolitan State University of Denver and the University of Colorado Denver.

== History ==
Originally established in 1967 for the Colorado Legislature, CCD is housed in the oldest neighborhood in Denver. The campus, known as The Auraria Higher Education Center (AHEC) was completed in 1976 and accommodates three colleges: CCD, Metropolitan State University of Denver and University of Colorado Denver. In 1985 CCD North opened on Downing Street, six miles northeast of Auraria. CCD North houses the trade programs of welding and precision machining. The Nursing and Allied Health programs are located on the Lowry Campus (formerly Lowry Air Force Base), in Aurora.

== Enrollment ==
CCD has over 9,000 students, 28% of which are full-time and 72% are part-time (Fall 2015 census data).

== Academic programs ==
CCD is an "open door" higher education institution offering four degrees: Associate of Arts, Associate of Science, Associate of Applied Science, and Associate of General Studies. With more than 100 areas of study in subject areas ranging from articulation and transfer, general education, career and technical education, to health sciences and nursing, Community College of Denver awards more than 700 associate degrees and certificates annually, serving almost 10,000 students per semester.

== Accreditation ==
CCD is regionally accredited by The Higher Learning Commission which is a member of the North Central Association of Colleges and Schools (NCA). CCD participates in the Academic Quality Improvement Program (AQIP).
