= EECL =

EECL may refer to

- The name of an Engineering Consultancy Company in London, UK.
- The ICAO airport code for the Linnahall heliport.
- The Engines and energy conversion laboratory at Colorado State University
