= Colorado State University System =

Higher education system in Colorado, US

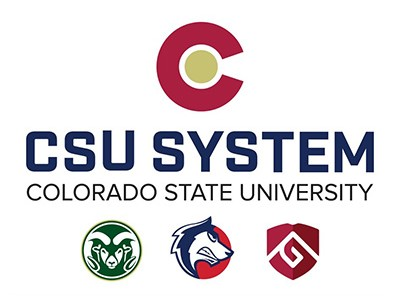
- Other name: CSU System / CSUS
- Former name: Colorado State Board of Agriculture
- Type: Public higher education system
- Established: 1877; 149 years ago
- Chancellor: Tony Frank
- Students: 51,498 (fall 2025)
- Location: Denver, Colorado, United States
- Website: csusystem.edu

The Colorado State University System (CSU System) is a Public Higher Educational System of the State of Colorado. It is one of four State of Colorado higher educational systems which include the Colorado State University System, the University of Colorado System, the Colorado Community College System and the Colorado School of Mines.

As part of its role to oversee public two-year and public four-year colleges and universities, the Colorado Department of Higher Education (DHE) exercises oversight over the Colorado State University System. It is the principal department responsible for implementing policies set by the Colorado Commission on Higher Education (CCHE).

The Colorado State University System oversees three distinct institutions:

- Colorado State University in Fort Collins (the flagship, R1:Doctoral research university)
- CSU Pueblo in Pueblo (a regional, comprehensive, federally designated Hispanic-Serving Institution)
- CSU Global Campus (the nation's first independent, fully-accredited, 100-percent online state university)

== History ==
In 1870, the Colorado Territorial Legislature passed an act authorizing the establishment of Colorado Agricultural College. Following Colorado's admission as a state in 1876, the state legislature reauthorized the institution. In order to provide for its management and control, Governor John Routt established the State Board of Agriculture to oversee the college's operations in 1877. In 1879 Colorado accepted provisions of the Morrill Act making Colorado Agricultural College a land-grant institution. The State Board of Agriculture continued to govern the college until 1985, when the Colorado General Assembly reorganized, renamed and restructured it as the Board of Governors of Colorado State University System. The legislation improved the organization and enhanced the oversight and support for the three campuses under the governance of the Colorado State University System.

In 1985, University of Southern Colorado (USC) was integrated into the newly created Colorado State University System (CSU System) with Colorado State University, Colorado's land-grant university, and Fort Lewis College. After 17 years as a member of the Colorado State University System, an independent study of higher education in Colorado recommended a change to the university's name to reflect the unique relationship with CSU. It was determined that the university's name be changed to Colorado State University Pueblo. Governor Bill Owens signed legislation changing the university's name effective July 1, 2003.

In 2002, the Colorado Legislature made Fort Lewis College a separate entity, independent of the CSU System.

In 2007, the Colorado State University System Board of Governors made the decision to create an exclusively online state university within the CSU System to meet the educational needs of adult learners by providing high quality online programs. Colorado State University Global Campus was founded in 2007 as the first statutorily defined, 100-percent online state university in the country.

=== Administration ===
The Board of Governors presides over the Colorado State University System (CSU System), which comprises Colorado State University (CSU), Colorado State University Pueblo (CSU-Pueblo) and Colorado State University Global Campus (CSU-Global).

The Colorado State University System Board of Governors consists of fifteen members:

- Nine voting members - appointed by the Governor of Colorado and confirmed by the Colorado State Senate for a four year term. Voting members are community leaders from many fields, including agriculture, business, and public service
- Six non-voting members represent CSU, CSU-Pueblo and CSU-Global, with one faculty member and one student leader elected to a one-year term

The board appoints a chancellor who oversees the three university presidents. Dr. Tony Frank has served as Chancellor of the Colorado State University System since 2019. Dr. Frank is scheduled to retire on June 30, 2027. The Colorado State University System has selected Rico Munn, JD to be his successor as chancellor. Mr. Munn currently serves as the Colorado State University System's Executive Vice Chancellor.
