= Amy Parsons =

16th President of Colorado State University

Amy Parsons is an American attorney, university administrator, and corporate executive who is the 16th President of Colorado State University (CSU). She assumed office on February 1, 2023. An alumna of CSU, Parsons has an extended history with the university, having served for 16 years in various senior executive roles within the institution and CSU System prior to her presidency.

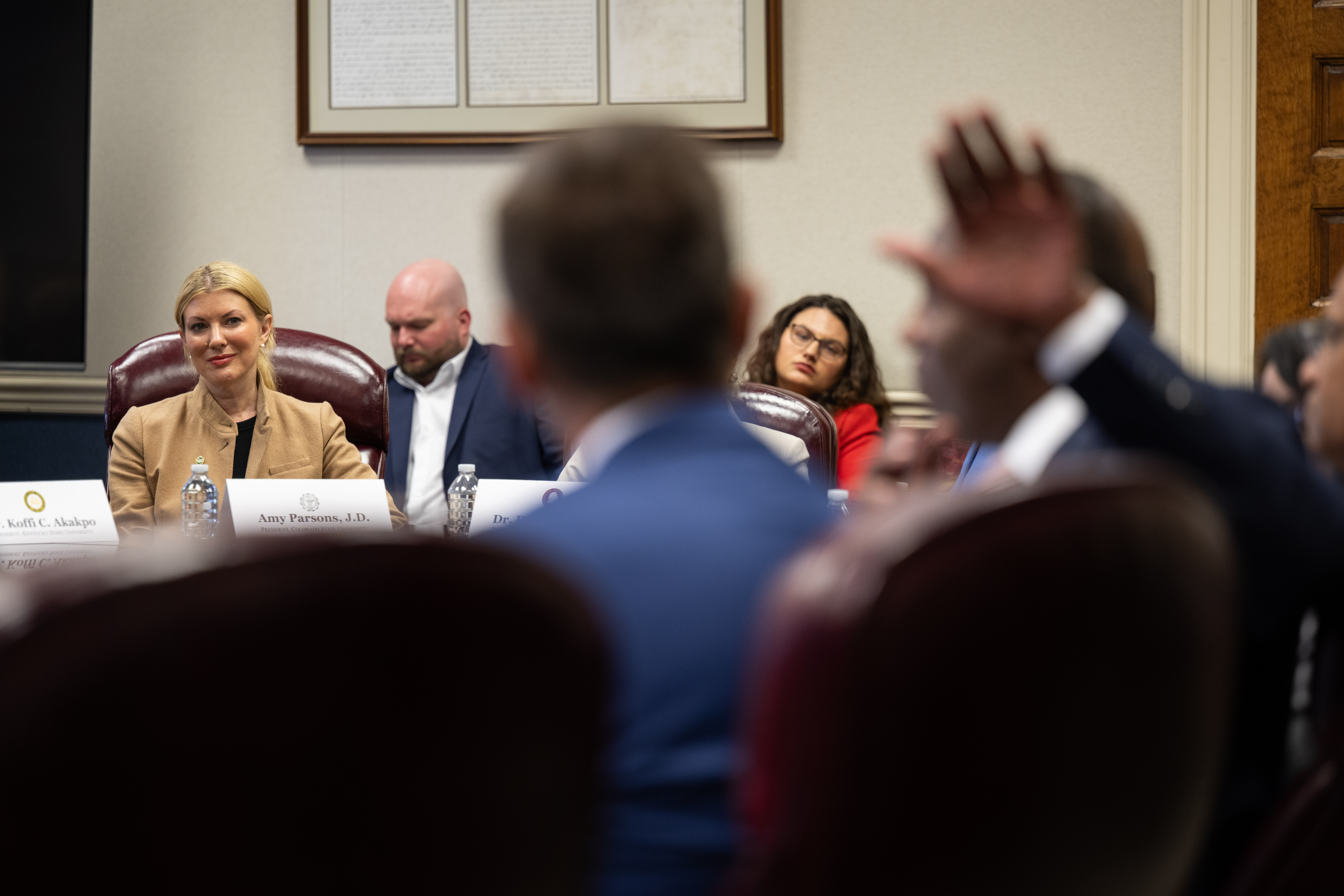
Parsons in 2026

Parsons earned a Bachelor of Arts in political science from CSU in 1995 and a Juris Doctor from the University of Colorado in 1999. She would then work as a commercial litigation attorney in Denver for Brownstein, Hyatt, Farber, Schreck before returning to CSU in 2004 in as the deputy general counsel and associate legal counsel for CSU. In 2009, she become the vice president for university operations and in 2015, she then became the executive vice chancellor of the CSU System. Then in October 2020, Parson would leave the University to become the CEO of a Mozzafiato, LLC, an Denver-based e-commerce company focused on Italian beauty products.In

In December of 2021, the CSU Board of Governors selected Parsons as the sole finalist of search for a new President of CSU. The announcement of her appointment was met with significant criticism from faculty and staff who cited concerns about a non-transparent selection process that named her as the sole finalist and her lack of a traditional academic and research background, which they argued was essential for leading a top-tier research university.

== Early life and education ==
Parsons was born in Loveland, Colorado, and spent her childhood in Cheyenne, Wyoming where she participated in 4-H. She attended Colorado State University for her undergraduate degree, graduating in 1995 with a Bachelors of Artis in Political Science.

In her time as a student at CSU, Parsons served in the Associated Students of Colorado State University (ASCSU), gave tours in the office of admissions, and worked in the Lory Student Center. She also participated in a White House internship program in Washington, D.C..

After graduating from CSU, Parsons pursued a legal education at the University of Colorado Law School, where she earned her Juris Doctor (J.D.) in 1999. While in law school, she was an associate editor for the Colorado Law Review. It was during this period that her interest in higher education law developed, particularly in areas concerning civil rights, employment law, and the legal complexities of university operations. This interest led her to an internship with the CSU General Counsel's Office.

== Career ==
=== Early Legal and Private Sector Career - 1999-2004 ===
Following Parsons' graduation from the University of Colorado Law School, she became a commercial litigation attorney at the Denver-based law firm Brownstein, Hyatt, Farber, Schreck where should work for the next five years. She would state that she originally envisioned a long-term career in private legal practice as a litigator.

=== Colorado State University Administration - 2004-2020 ===
In 2004, Parsons returned to her alma mater, joining CSU General Counsel's as Associate Legal Counsel and Deputy General Counsel until 2009 when she would become the Vice President for University Operations. As Vice President, Parsons focused on the university's budget, finance, campus safety, and capital construction. CSU states she helped guide the university through the significant fiscal challenges of the Great Recession. The also state she supported the university’s first comprehensive salary equity survey, an initiative designed to identify and remedy gender-based pay disparities among employees. As well as a period of physical transformation on the Fort Collins campus, which included the construction and renovation of numerous classroom buildings, research facilities, and other infrastructure - including the development of Canvas Stadium.

Sources often claim to have supported a comprehensive salary equity survey although, this is disputed by a administrator who claims, "that study was led by faculty women, not Parsons."

Parsons was promoted to Executive Vice Chancellor of the CSU System in 2015, a position she held until 2020. In this capacity, she was responsible for system-wide strategy and major initiatives across the three campuses: CSU Fort Collins, CSU Pueblo, and CSU Global. Major projects often accredited to her included the creation of the CSU Spur campus at the National Western Center in Denver, a major public-facing educational center focused on food, water, and health. She also led the development of the CSU Todos Santos Center in Baja California Sur, Mexico, and managed the complex planning, negotiation, and construction of the on-campus Canvas Stadium.

=== Presidency of Colorado State University ===
==== Appointment ====
In 2022, the CSU Board of Governors began a five-month national search for the university’s 16th president with Parker Executive Search. A 31-member advisory committee reviewed 54 applications, interviewed 12 candidates, and recommended three finalists to the board.

On December 2, 2022, the Board of Governors announced Parsons as the sole finalist for the position. This decision was followed by a legally mandated 14-day public notice period. On December 16, 2022, the board voted unanimously to confirm her appointment. Parsons officially began her term on February 1, 2023, and gave her first fall address to the university in October 2023. She succeeded interim president Rick Miranda and became the second woman to hold the presidency, following her predecessor, Joyce McConnell.

==== Tenure and Initiatives ====
As president, Parsons states her agenda is focused on large-scale goals related to the university's institutional health, public mission, and overall competitiveness, a reflection of her extensive background in executive administration. She has identified student success as her foremost priority, with an emphasis on access, affordability, and comprehensive support systems that guide students from their initial application through graduation and into their careers.

A signature initiative during her first year was the "Thematic Year of Democracy and Civic Engagement," a campus-wide program aimed at promoting productive dialogue on divisive issues. In line with her focus on institutional competitiveness, Parsons committed to improving employee pay and is overseeing the hiring of a new executive leadership team, including a provost and several vice presidents. Her tenure has also seen continued campus development, such as the creation of a $150 million laser research facility on the foothills campus, intended to advance research in areas like nuclear fusion. Following the Assassination of Charlie Kirk, she launched the Colorado Democracy Prize, a new program to reward student organizations that create events modeling collaborative and thoughtful debate.

== Controversies as CSU's President ==
Parsons' appointment and presidency have been marked by significant controversies, primarily regarding her appointment and the response to pressures placed by the second Trump Administration.

=== Presidential Selection Process ===
Parsons’ appointment faced strong faculty opposition. A Faculty Council survey showed overwhelming disapproval, with many calling her unqualified and saying the decision harmed CSU’s integrity. The CSU chapter of the AAUP echoed these concerns in a letter to the Board of Governors. In defense, the board and search chair argued a confidential process was needed to attract top candidates. Board leaders praised Parsons’ business expertise and commitment to CSU, while Parsons herself acknowledged faculty concerns, pledging to "earn" their trust over time. The University also responded with article published in their newsletter, SOURCE, with quotes from individuals who have worked with Parsons in the past.

=== Response to 2025 Federal Directives on DEI ===
In February 2025, Parsons' administration faced a major test when the U.S. Department of Education under the Trump administration issued a "Dear Colleague" letter. Based on the Supreme Court's ruling in Students for Fair Admissions v. Harvard, the directive prohibited educational institutions receiving federal funds from using race as a factor in admissions, hiring, financial aid, and other programs. Universities were given 14 days to comply or risk losing federal funding, which accounts for roughly one-third of CSU's annual budget.

President Parsons responded with a campus-wide email stating that while the university was confident it was already in compliance with the law, it would "take additional steps to follow the federal administration's new interpretations" to safeguard its federal funding. She announced immediate adjustments to some employee job duties, human resources policies, and university websites.

This response from Parsons' Office triggered a significant backlash from some students, faculty, and community members. Several protests occurred with the campus community advocating for the continued support of Cultural Resource Centers and concerns around the Presidents office perceived capitulation to the Trump Administrations pressures to halt all diversity, equity, and inclusion (DEI) on campus. At a subsequent Faculty Council meeting, the administration was also criticized for a lack of transparency and for failing to involve faculty experts in its scenario planning.

Amid legal challenges and a federal court restraining order, the administration paused implementation of changes and formed an Incident Management Team. The President Office later joined other research universities in filing an amicus brief and issuing statements against federal overreach and research funding cuts.

=== Free Speech Policy Changes ===
On August 15, 2025, the Parsons administration quietly revised the CSU Freedom of Speech and Peaceful Assembly Policy, which allegedly did not follow the standard policy development and editing process. This action elicited a response from state and national organizations such as Foundation for Individual Rights and Expression. The revisions were not disclosed until the September 2 Faculty Council meeting, and introduced two significant departures from the prior 2022 policy: chalking on the Lory Student Center Plaza was restricted to publicizing official university-sponsored events, and a new "Employee Speech" section was added requiring employees to engage in expressive activities only as private citizens. Both the AAUP-CSU andFIRE condemned the revisions, with FIRE writing the policy constituted an "impermissible restraint" on faculty speech and threatened to "chill expression" at the public university legally bound to protect First Amendment rights.

Enforcement came to a head on the two year anniversary of the October 7 attacks, when university officials reportedly used water trucks to erase student chalk messages on the Lory Student Center Plaza, including messages reading "Free Gaza" and "Free Palestine," while an administrator allegedly threatened at least one student with arrest for continued chalking. Later that day, following discussions with President Parsons at a Faculty Council meeting, the administration withdrew the 2025 policy and reinstated the 2022 policy. Student protests continued after the repeal and on November 5, 2025, the student senate passed a resolution condemning the actions taken by administration, calling for a public pledge of accountability, and a full explanation for the policy revision.

== Awards and Board Affiliations ==
=== Honors and awards ===
- CU Law Distinguished Alumni Achievement Award (2025)
- Zeta Tau Alpha National Alumna of the Year (2024)
- Inducted into CSU's Inaugural Class Circle of Legends (2025)
- Outstanding Women in Business, Denver Business Journal (2017)

=== Board Service and Affiliations ===
- NCAA Committee on Infractions
- U.S. Committee for Economic Development, Board of Trustees
- Salazar Center for North American Conservation, External Advisory Board
- Colorado Business Roundtable, Board of Directors
- Alpine Bank, Board of Directors
- Denver Sports Commission
- The Mountain West Board of Directors
- The Pac-12 Board of Directors
- The Denver Museum of Nature and Science Board of Trustees
- Former board member for the Metro Denver Economic Development Corporation, Boys & Girls Clubs of Metro Denver, and the National Western Center Authority Board.

== Personal life ==
Parsons is married to Jeff Parsons, a fellow attorney whom she met while they were both students at the University of Colorado Law School. The couple has two daughters, both of whom have attended Colorado State University.
