= Cooperative Institute for Research in the Atmosphere =

Research institute at Colorado State University

Coordinates: 40°35′14.3″N 105°8′49.8″W

The Cooperative Institute for Research in the Atmosphere (CIRA) is a scientific research institution at Colorado State University (CSU) that operates under a cooperative agreement with the National Oceanic and Atmospheric Administration (NOAA) Office of Oceanic and Atmospheric Research (OAR) and the National Environmental Satellite, Data, and Information Service (NESDIS). Atmospheric research at CIRA focuses on augmenting operational meteorology with advanced techniques in satellite observations and retrievals, numerical modeling and computational techniques, and data analysis, visualization, and storage. Along with NOAA, CIRA also partners with the National Science Foundation (NSF), the National Aeronautics and Space Administration (NASA), the National Park Service (NPS), and the Department of Defense (DoD).

It is one of 16 NOAA Cooperative Institutes (CIs).

Specific research themes at CIRA include:

- Satellite algorithm development, training and education
- Regional to global scale modeling systems
- Data assimilation
- Climate-weather processes
- Data distribution
- Societal and economic impacts of weather and climate
- Education and public outreach on climate systems

The CIRA campus is located on the Foothills Campus of Colorado State University, in Fort Collins.
