= Morgan Library (Colorado State University) =

University library in Colorado, United States

Coordinates: 40°34′23.08″N 105°5′5.62″W

The Morgan Library is a university library located at Colorado State University (CSU) in Fort Collins, Colorado. Its address is 1201 Center Avenue Mall.

== Construction history ==
=== Initial construction ===
On May 13, 1958, preliminary planning for a new library at Colorado State University was authorized by the State Board of Agriculture, and in 1961 more detailed planning began. The State Board of Agriculture voted to name the library after William E. Morgan, who was president of the university from 1949 until 1969. According to the Board President C.C. Waneka, the library was named, "in recognition of the outstanding leadership displayed by President Morgan during a period in which CSU has achieved unprecedented growth in academic structure, numbers of students, and physical facilities." CSU Physical Plant employees as well as librarians worked to move all collections into the Morgan Library. The library opened its doors on January 4, 1964, at 8am. The initial library was designed by James M. Hunter & Associates of Boulder and constructed by Hensel Phelps Construction Co. of Greely.

=== Renovations ===
==== 1996 Addition ====
The 1996 addition was designated by President Albert C. Yates in 1994 who determined that the modernization of Morgan Library was a priority. The addition was built by Gerald H. Phipps Construction Company and began construction in July 1994 and continued after the library reopened in August 1994. The project added multiple computer labs as well as an electronic information center and more than 300 public access computer terminals. The renovation was nearly complete when the flood of 1997 hit on July 28, 1997.

==== 2011 renovation ====
In September 2006, the redesign of the library was announced. More space was designated for workstations and study areas, and thousands of books moved from the library to the Book Storage Facility located on Lake Street. In 2011, the North entrance of the library was redesigned and a 24-hour study area was added to the North entrance, commonly known as "The Cube". The renovation project added a coffee shop to the first floor of the library called "Morgan's Grind." The renovation added an event hall and an area that offered larger meeting spaces. Morgan Library reopened in 2012.

===== The Cube =====
Students are able to access the 24-hour study area with use of their CSU student ID RamCard after hours. The addition was part of a $16.8 million renovation of the Morgan Library that began in March 2011. The cube has entryways on the East and West sides of the building and has seating in the form of tables and lounge seating for 85 people as well as heating and air conditioning. The building features photometric glass that allows the windows to darken based on light levels outside, allowing heat in the cube to be managed.

On August 24, 2018, there was a reported bed-bug outbreak within the Study Cube. The Study Cube was closed for a week, during which the building was treated by an exterminator and heat steamed twice.

===== 2024 renovation =====
In August 2024, the South entrance of the library opened to the student population after construction added a ramp to be compliant with the Americans with Disabilities Act of 1990.

== The Flood of 1997 ==
On July 28, 1997, a flood hit Fort Collins, including Colorado State University, known as the 1997 Spring Creek Flood. The flood flooded the entire basement level of Morgan Library by midnight. The flood damaged an estimated half a million books and periodicals due to a wall of water being sent into the library, submerging the books in ten feet of water. There were more books than usual being temporarily stored in the basement due to renovations taking place. The water tore a six-foot hole in the wall that entered into the basement of the library.

For prevention of potential future flooding, Colorado State University built a concrete retaining barrier on the West side of the library as part of a mitigation plan funded by the Federal Emergency Management Agency. In the days after the flood, water was pumped out of the basement. In the months following the flood, the building was dried out and repaired. Initially, the university was working with a library recovery firm that sent the books to a commercial cold storage facility in Laramie, Wyoming. President Albert C. Yates terminated the agreement with the first firm, and the books that were damaged were sent to disaster recovery company DRS,Inc. in Fort Worth, Texas where they were to be freeze dried, reshaped, and cleaned.
