= Colorado Commission on Higher Education =

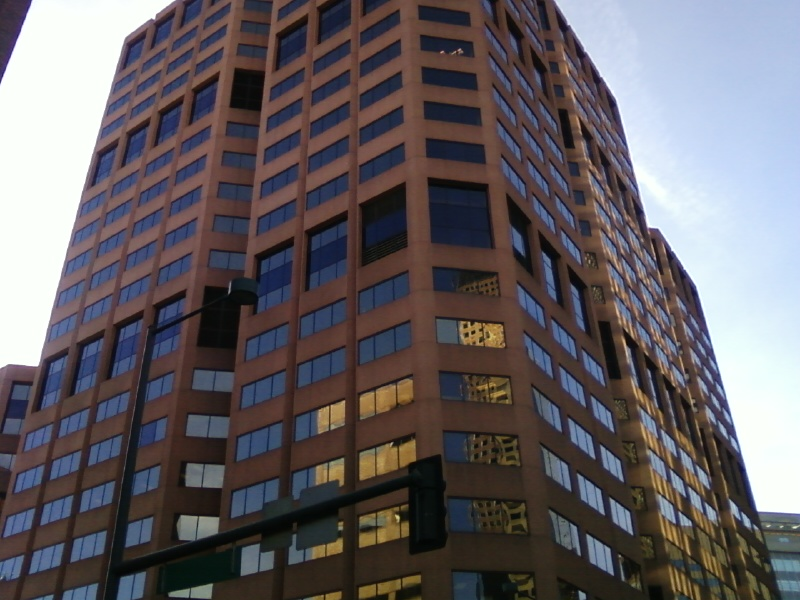
- One Civic Center Plaza

Commission overview
- Jurisdiction: Colorado
- Commission executive: JB Holston, Executive Director, Colorado Department of Higher Education
- Website: cdhe.colorado.gov/commissioners

The Colorado Commission on Higher Education (CCHE) was established in 1965 by the Colorado General Assembly. The Commission replaced an association which met informally to consider matters related to higher education. The Colorado Department of Higher Education (DHE) is the principal department of the Colorado state government responsible for implementing the policies of the CCHE.

In 1985 the Assembly gave the Commission increased authority and specific directives through the passage of House Bill 1187. Specific responsibilities include developing long-range plans for an evolving state system of higher education:

- Review and approve degree programs.
- Establish the distribution formula for higher education funding; recommend statewide funding levels to the legislature.
- Approve institutional capital construction requests; recommend capital construction priorities to the legislature.
- Develop policies for institutional and facility master plans.
- Administer statewide student financial assistance programs through policy development, program evaluation, and allocation of funds.
- Develop and administer a statewide off-campus (extended studies), community service, and continuing education program.
- Determine institutional roles and missions.
- Establish statewide enrollment policies and admission standards.
- Conduct special studies as appropriate or directed, regarding statewide education policy, finance, or effective coordination.

The eleven-member board appointed by the governor of Colorado to create and enforce policy for Colorado public higher education.

== List of Universities ==
Four-Year Schools that are managed/supervised by the Commission through their Trustees/Board of Governors/Board of Regents:

University/College	City	Enrollment (2024)
Adams State University	Alamosa	2,901
Colorado Mesa University	Grand Junction	9,785
Colorado School of Mines	Golden	8,044
Colorado State University	Fort Collins	34,096
Colorado State University–Pueblo	Pueblo	6,851
Fort Lewis College	Durango	3,544
Metropolitan State University of Denver	Denver	18,453
University of Colorado–Anschutz	Aurora	4,741
University of Colorado Boulder	Boulder	38,799
University of Colorado–Colorado Springs	Colorado Springs	11,354
University of Colorado–Denver	Denver	18,340
University of Northern Colorado	Greeley	8,869
Western Colorado University	Gunnison	3,568

== See also ==
- Colorado Community College System
