= MAX Bus Rapid Transit (Colorado) =

Bus system in Fort Collins, Colorado, United States

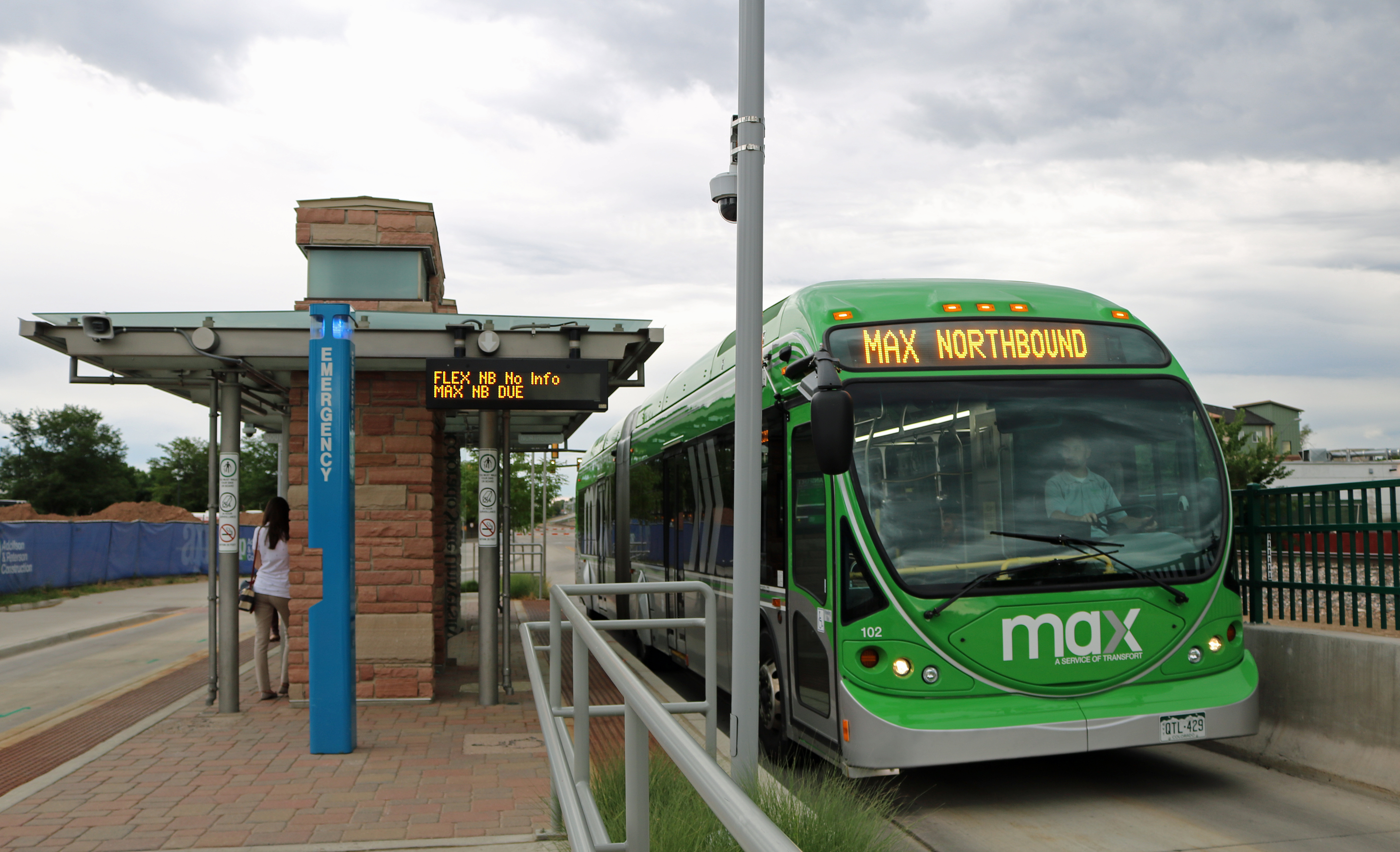
- A MAX bus at the West Prospect Road station.

Overview
- Locale: Fort Collins, Colorado
- Termini: South Transit Center; Downtown Transit Center
- Stations: 14
- Website: ridetransfort.com/max

Service
- Type: Bus rapid transit
- Operator: Transfort
- Rolling stock: NABI 60-BRT
- Daily ridership: 4,680 (Sep. 2015)
- Ridership: 564,545 (2024)

History
- Opened: May 10, 2014

Technical
- Line length: 5 miles (8.0 km)

MAX Bus Rapid Transit is a bus rapid transit system serving Fort Collins, Colorado, United States. The service, operated by Transfort, consists of one route serving 12 stations on the 5-mile-long (8.0 km) Mason Corridor Transitway between South Transit Center and Downtown Fort Collins, with stops near the Colorado State University campus. The MAX route includes sections of new dedicated bus guideway, as well as shared city streets; in some cases, the bus has priority signal access.

It opened on May 10, 2014, at a cost of $87 million, as the first bus rapid transit system in the state of Colorado. Service was free for the first three months, with fare collection starting August 25. Fares must be pre-paid online or by using a ticket machine at any stop. Tickets and passes may also be purchased at each of Transfort's transit stations. As of August 27, 2017, MAX and several supporting routes also operate on Sunday. In its first five years, the route provided 6.2 million rides and was lauded as a top-notch service for a city its size.

The Institute for Transportation and Development Policy (ITDP), under its BRT Standard, has given MAX a preliminary classification as a "Basic BRT" corridor.

== Stations ==
- South Transit Center
- Harmony
- Troutman
- Horsetooth
- Swallow
- Drake
- Spring Creek
- Prospect
- University (Colorado State University)
- Laurel
- Mulberry
- Olive
- Mountain
- Downtown Transit Center

== Service ==
MAX operates daily year-round, frequency depending on time of day, generally every 10–15 minutes Monday through Saturday, with no Sunday service.

Each full-size (60' articulating) MAX bus can carry four bicycles inside—two standing and two hanging. Smaller MAX buses have a triple bike rack on the front, with room for one bike inside.

== Ridership ==
The ridership statistics shown here are from the National Transit Database.

== See also ==
- List of bus rapid transit systems in the Americas
