= Transfort =

Fort Collins, Colorado public transit operator

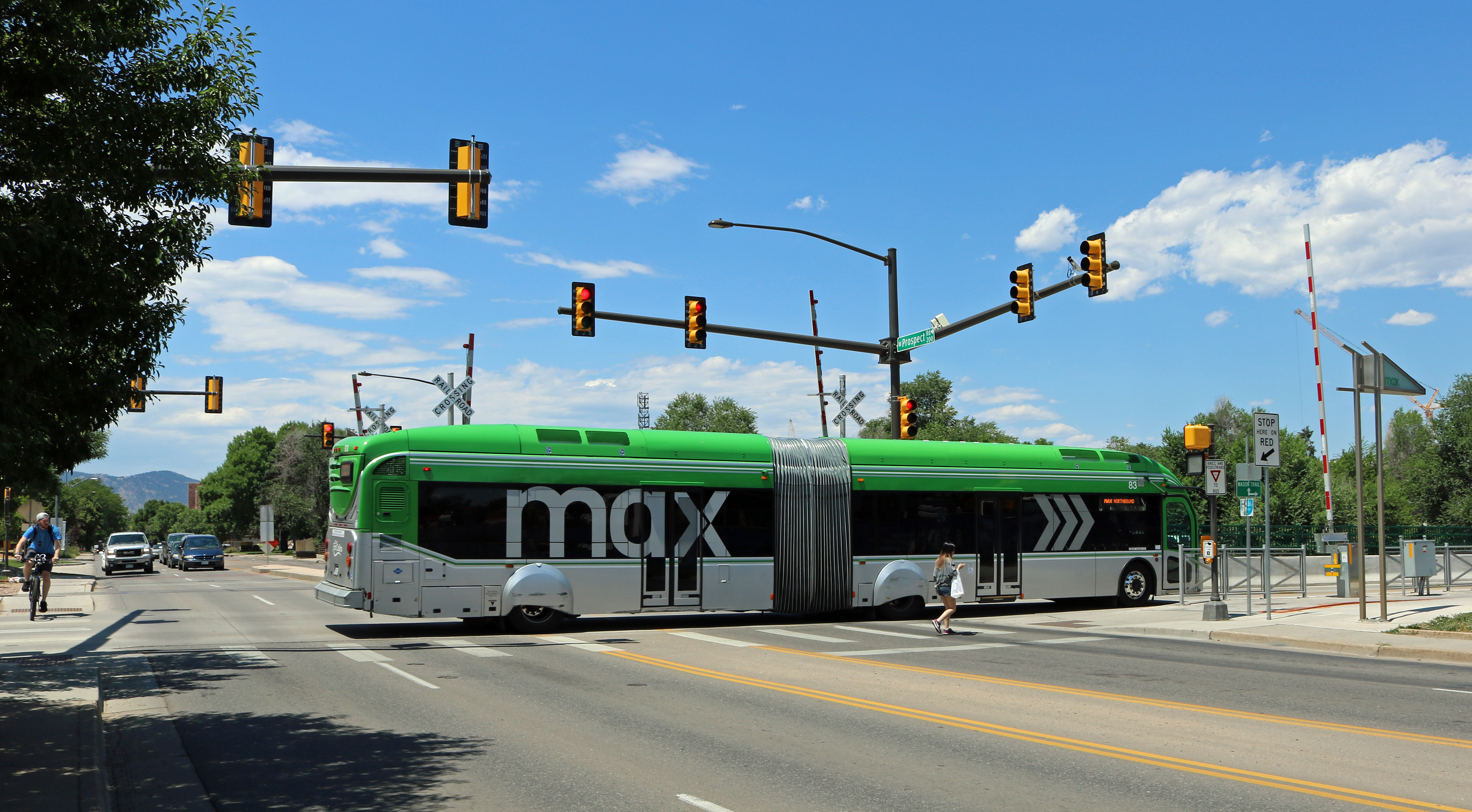
- A Transfort Max bus crossing West Prospect Road
- Headquarters: 6570 Portner Road; Fort Collins, Colorado
- Locale: Fort Collins, Colorado
- Service area: Larimer County, Colorado
- Service type: Bus service
- Routes: 22
- Fleet: 53
- Daily ridership: 9,600 (weekdays, Q3 2025)
- Annual ridership: 2,631,100 (2024)
- Fuel type: CNG, Electric
- Website: ridetransfort.com

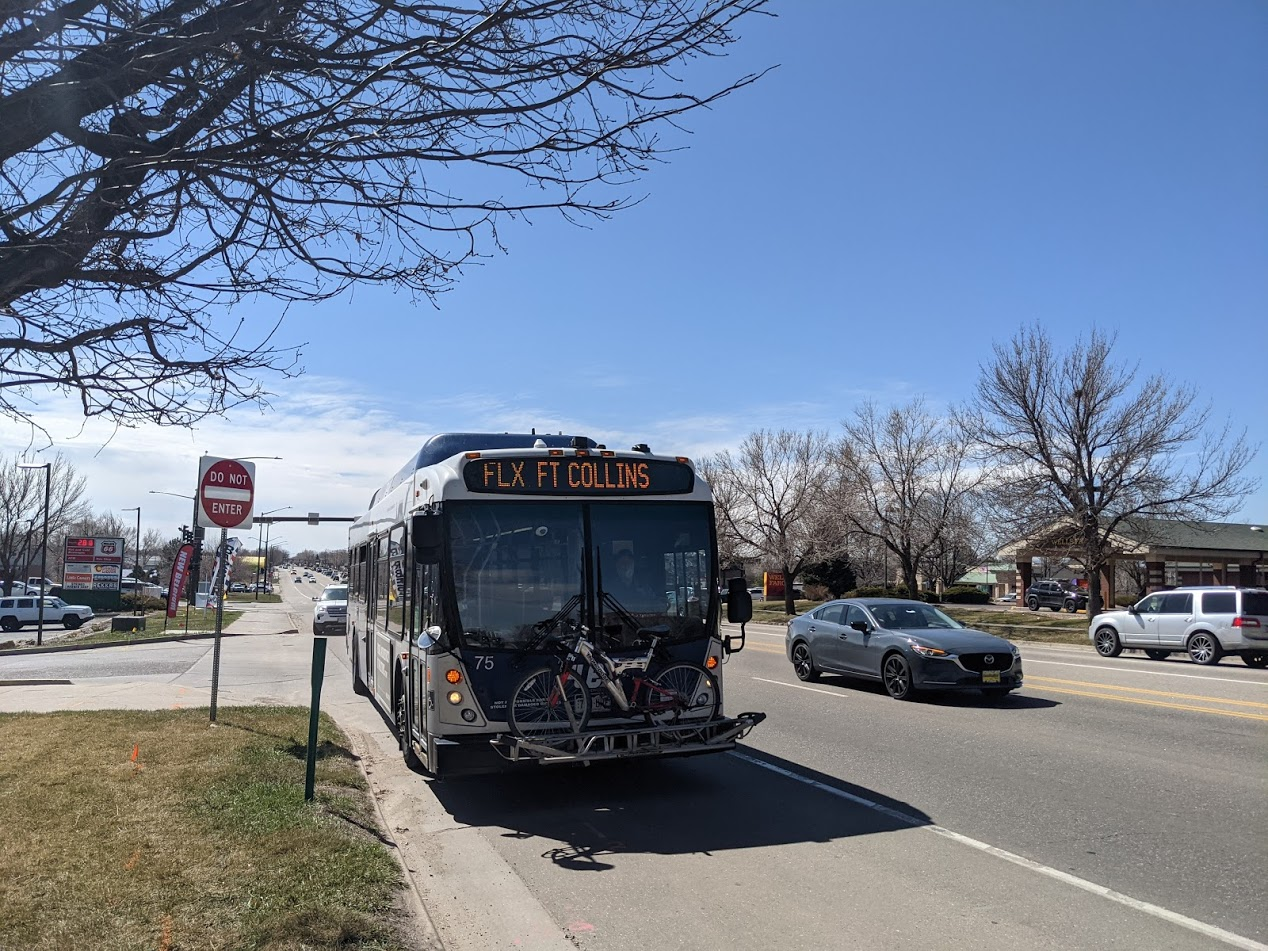
Transfort FLEX Bus arriving at Garfield & 37th

Transfort is the public transportation operator for the City of Fort Collins, Colorado. The system offers 22 regular routes, with 20 of them providing all-day service Monday through Friday. Six-day intercity service is provided by the FLEX to Loveland, Berthoud, and Longmont. Additionally, five routes for transporting Colorado State University students, faculty and staff run throughout the school year. In 2024, the system provided transportation services to 2,631,100 people.

Since 2014, Transfort has operated a bus rapid transit service, known as MAX, between South Transit Center and Downtown Fort Collins.

As of March 2020, Transfort is fare-free. Fare collection was stopped during the COVID-19 pandemic, and has yet to be resumed.

== Route details ==
Note: Some routes may be suspended, operating less frequently, or on reduced span due to the ongoing COVID-19 pandemic.

Route	Service area	Timepoints	Period of operation and headways
2	Campus West	CSU Transit Center, Prospect & Shields, Prospect & Taft Hill, Prospect & Overland Trail, Elizabeth & Overland Trail, Elizabeth & City Park, CSU Transit Center	Mon–Sun. Every 30 minutes.
3	Campus West	CSU Transit Center, Plum, West Elizabeth, CSU Transit Center	Mon–Sun. Mon-Fri. Every 15 minutes when CSU is in session, Every 30 minutes when CSU is not in session. Sat-Sun. Every 30 minutes
5	Downtown Transit Center, travels along Jefferson and Lincoln, north and south on Lemay, on Horsetooth to the Mall Transfer Point with transfers to other routes.	Poudre Valley Hospital, Mall Transfer Point, Wal-Mart & Home Depot area, Downtown Transit Center	Mon–Sat. Every 60 minutes.
6	CSU, Taft, Drake, Mall, JFK, South Transit Center	South Transit Center, JFK & Harmony, Stanford & Monroe, Drake & College, Drake & Raintree, Taft & Stuart, Taft & Elizabeth, Mulberry & Washington, CSU Transit Center	Mon–Sat. Every 60 minutes.
7	CSU and Drake Road	CSU Transit Center, Meridian & Lake, Senior Center, Drake & College, Drake & Kansas	Mon–Fri. Every 30 minutes. Sat. Every 60 minutes
8	North Fort Collins and L.C. Department of Human Services	Downtown Transit Center, Northside Aztlan Center, L.C. Dept. of Human Services, Poudre Valley Mobile Home Park, college & Conifer, Downtown Transit Center	Mon–Sun. Every 30 minutes.
81	North Fort Collins and L.C. Department of Human Services	Downtown Transit Center, college & Conifer, PV Mobile Home Park, Blue Spruce/Human Services, Linden & Vine, Downtown Transit Center	Mon–Fri. Every 30 minutes.
9	Northwest Fort Collins, Overland Trail, and Laporte	Downtown Transit Center, Lincoln Middle School, Overland Trail & Vine, Laporte & Impala, LaPorte & Shields	Mon–Sat. Every 60 minutes.
10	Laporte, Mulberry and CSU Transit Center	Downtown Transit Center, Laporte, Mulberry, CSU Transit Center, Downtown Transit Center	Mon–Sat. Every 60 minutes.
11/12	Horsetooth Road and Front Range Community College	South Transit Center, Harmony & Starflower, Harmony & Taft Hill, Horsetooth & Shields, Horsetooth & Mason, Horsetooth & Lemay, Horsetooth & Ziegler	Mon–Sat. Every 60 minutes. Route 11 is Eastbound, Route 12 is Westbound.
14	Northeast Fort Collins	Downtown Transit Center, Lincoln & Lemay, N. Frontage & Centro, Vine	Mon–Sun. Every 60 minutes.
16	Harmony Road	South Transit Center, Harmony & Timberline, Harmony & Corbett, Rock Creek & Fossil Ridge HS	Mon–Fri. Every 30 minutes. Sat-Sun. Every 60 minutes.
18	Downtown Transit Center, travels along Whedbee and Stover, then along E. Prospect to the Midpoint area	Fort Collins Library & Museum, Discovery Center, DMA Plaza, Orthopedic Center of the Rockies, County Detention Center & Human Services, Lesher Junior High, Downtown U.S. Post Office	Mon–Sat. Every 60 minutes.
19	CSU, Rocky Mountain High School, & Front Range Community College	Front Range Community College, Shields & Horsetooth, Shields & Drake, Shields & Prospect, CSU Transit Center	Mon–Fri, year-round. Every 60 minutes. Mon–Fri, when Poudre School District or CSU is in session, every 30 minutes during AM & PM peak travel periods.
31	CSU and Campus West	CSU Transit Center, City Park & Plum, Constitution & Elizabeth, Plum & City Park	Mon–Fri, when Colorado State University is in session. Every 10 minutes.
32	CSU and Campus West	CSU Transit Center, City Park & Plum, Constitution & Elizabeth, Plum & City Park, CSU Transit Center	Mon–Fri, when Colorado State University is in session. Every 30 minutes.
33	CSU Foothills Campus and West Elizabeth	CSU Transit Center, Laporte & Overland, CSU Foothills Campus, Rampart	Mon–Fri, when Colorado State University is in session. Every 60 minutes.
92	Poudre High and Downtown	Downtown Transit Center, LaPorte & Shields, LaPorte & Impala	Mon–Fri, when Poudre School District is in session.
MAX Bus Rapid Transit	Runs from the south side of town at the South Transit Center (STC), along the Mason Corridor, through the east side of the CSU Campus, and ends its service at the Downtown Transit Center (DTC).	Downtown Transit Center, Drake Station, South Transit Center	Mon-Sun, year round. Daytime Frequency Every 10–15 minutes. Evening and Sunday Frequencies Every 30 Minutes.
FLEX Regional Service	Fort Collins, Loveland, Berthoud and Longmont, Boulder	Downtown Transit Center, South Transit Center, college & Skyway, Garfield & 50th, Loveland Food Bank, Cleveland & 8th, Mountain & 3rd, Coffman & 8th, 9th & Coffman, Pearl & Junction, Canyon & 14th, 18th & Euclid	Mon-Sat, year round. Every 60 minutes.
Around the Horn Shuttle	Colorado State University On-Campus Shuttle	Moby Arena & Plum, CSU Transit Center, university & East, Lake & Center, CSU Vet School	Mon-Fri, year round. Every 10 minutes when CSU is in session. Every 20 minutes on Saturdays and when CSU is out of session.
Gold	Late night shuttle around Downtown and surrounding neighborhoods.	Mountain & Remington, Laurel & Washington, Elizabeth & Taft Hill, Prospect & Taft Hill	Fri–Sat, 10:30 p.m. to 2:30 a.m. Every 15 minutes.

Former Routes:

- Route 1: Front Range Community College to Downtown Transit Center via College Ave. Replaced by MAX Bus Rapid Transit.
- Route 4: CSU Transit Center to LaPorte and Taft Hill via. Loomis, Mountain, & Mulberry.
- Route 11 (old): CSU Transit Center West Loop along Plum St. Replaced by Route 31.
- Route 15: CSU Transit Center to Downtown Transit Center via Howes St. Replaced by Route 10
- Route 17: Fossil Ridge HS to Prospect Park via Timberline Rd. Discountinued due to the lack of operator restrooms.
- Route 91: Lincoln Middle School to Downtown. School Tripper.
- Foxtrot: Regional Service between South Fort Collins and Loveland. Replaced by the FLEX.
- Green: Late night shuttle launched accompanying the remaining Gold route.

== Other routes ==
=== FLEX ===
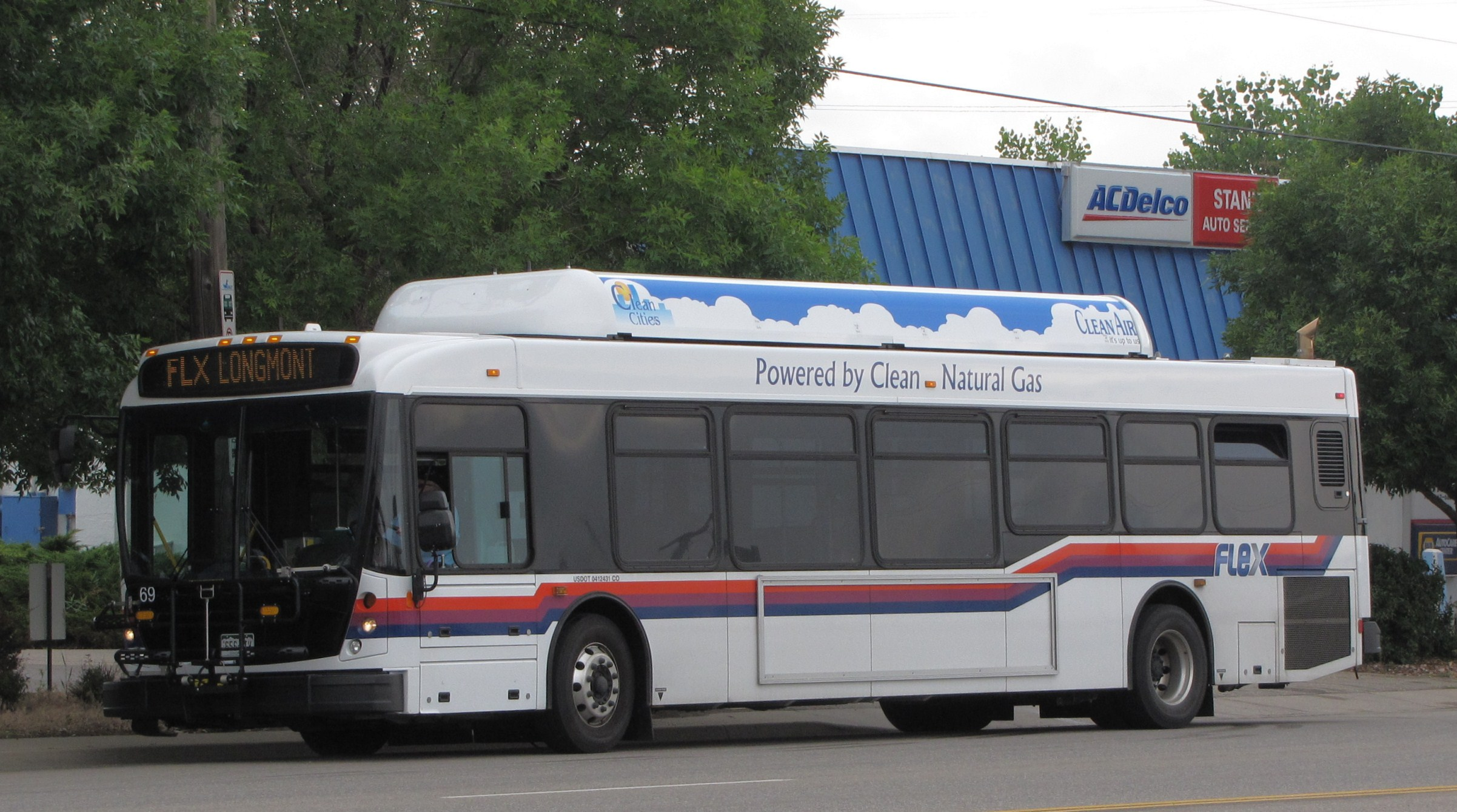
A 40' NABI bus operating the FLEX regional bus service

FLEX is a regional route with local and express service connecting Fort Collins, Loveland, Berthoud, Longmont, as well as limited weekday rush hour service to Boulder. From the Downtown Transit Center in Fort Collins to the South Transit Center, The Flex to Boulder operates on the MAX route, serving all the MAX Stations.

=== MAX BRT ===
The Mason Corridor Express (MAX) BRT opened on May 10, 2014.

MAX Bus Rapid Transit (BRT) service runs along the Mason Corridor to connect and serves major activity and employment centers including Midtown, CSU and Downtown. MAX links with other Transfort bus routes, Park-n-Rides, the city's bicycle/pedestrian trail system, and other local and regional transit routes.

MAX's system has a dedicated transit-only guideway that runs parallel to the Burlington Northern Santa Fe Railway between the South Transit Center (south of Harmony Road) and Horsetooth Road, then again between Drake Road and University Avenue (CSU). The exclusive guideway is an integral part of MAX BRT service.

== Fleet ==
Transfort has a fleet of around 50 buses.

- Gillig Low Floor BRT 35'(CNG)
- Gillig Low Floor BRT 40'(CNG)
- Gillig Low Floor BRT 40'(BEV)
- NABI LFW 31' (CNG powered)
- NABI LFW 35' (CNG powered)
- NABI LFW 40' (CNG powered), used for FLEX regional bus service and busier bus routes
- NABI BRT 60' (CNG powered), used for MAX service

Standard buses have 3-bike front racks, while the MAX branded buses have interior racks for four bikes. Two floor mounted racks and two vertical racks.

== Transit centers ==
Transfort has three transit centers.

- Downtown Transit Center (Laporte and Mason Street)
- CSU Transit Center (Lory Student Center)
- South Transit Center (Harmony and College)

== Fixed Route Ridership ==
Data includes direct operation, purchased transportation, and BRT. From National Transportation Database.

== See also ==
- List of bus transit systems in the United States
