= Engines and energy conversion laboratory =

The Engines and Energy Conversion Laboratory (EECL) is a research/education program housed in the Department of Mechanical Engineering at Colorado State University (CSU).

== Background ==
The Engines & Energy Conversion Laboratory (EECL) is housed in the Department of Mechanical Engineering. The laboratory was established in the Old Fort Collins Power Plant in June 1992. In the years since then, the laboratory has grown to become one of the more known engine research programs in the United States. The EECL is an international manufacturer in the fields of gas engines for power generation and compression, small 2-stroke cycle engines for developing countries, alternative fuels for automobiles, computational fluid dynamic (CFD) modeling of engines, and optical combustion diagnostics. The Department has invested in the laboratory by hiring faculty members who have established new EECL programs in diesel engines, laser diagnostics, and plasma applications in engines.

== Natural Gas Engines ==
The EECL's earliest work with natural gas pipeline engines produced a series of market-driven environmental solutions that improved the industry. In the last five years, the lab has done the same thing but has expanded its scope to encompass areas both upstream (fuels) and downstream (power grids) of its core engine Research and Intelligence. In addition, the EECL has applied this research in energy conversion technology and product development to the creation of solutions with an impact on energy production, conversion, and consumption globally – testing new energy technologies around the world including India, The Philippines, Guatemala, Nicaragua, and Nepal.

== Research ==
The Lab's main research areas include engine emissions and efficiency research, biofuel research (including algae-derived biofuels through its partnership with Solix), researching cookstoves through its partnership with Envirofit International, as well as distributed power and smart grid research.
