= Colorado Department of Higher Education =

Department of the Colorado state government

Department of Higher Education
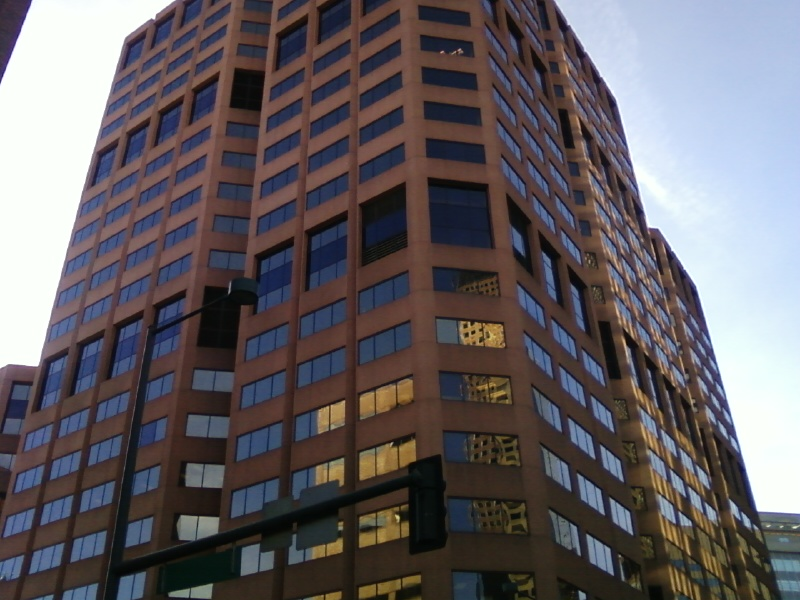
- Colorado State Bank and Trust Building

Department overview
- Jurisdiction: Colorado
- Headquarters: 1600 Broadway, Suite 2200, Denver, Colorado
- Department executive: JB Holston, Executive Director
- Website: highered.colorado.gov

The Colorado Department of Higher Education (DHE) is the principal department of the Colorado state government responsible for implementing the policies of the Colorado Commission on Higher Education (CCHE).

As the policy and advocacy coordinating board for Colorado's system of public higher education, the Department and Colorado Commission on Higher Education carry out the policies of the General Assembly and serve as a bridge between the Governor and Legislature and the governing boards of the institutions of higher education. The Department acts as a coordinating body for public two-year and four-year institutions and authorizes private schools and colleges to operate in the state. Several departmental agencies are under the Colorado Department of Higher Education:

- College Assist
- CollegeInvest
- College in Colorado
- History Colorado
- Colorado GEAR UP
- Division of Private Occupational Schools
- Colorado Opportunity Scholarship Initiative
- StudyColorado

== See also ==
- Colorado Commission on Higher Education
- Colorado Department of Education
