= Colorado State University =

Public university in Fort Collins, Colorado, US

- Former names: Colorado Agricultural College (1870–1935); Colorado State College of Agriculture and Mechanic Arts (1935–1950); Colorado Agricultural and Mechanical College (1950–1957)
- Motto: "Education, Service, Research, Extension"
- Type: Public land-grant research university
- Established: 1870; 156 years ago
- Parent institution: Colorado State University System
- Accreditation: HLC
- Academic affiliations: ORAU; URA; space-grant
- Endowment: $667.5 million (2025)
- Chancellor: Anthony A. Frank
- President: Amy Parsons
- Faculty: 1,468
- Administrative staff: 4,379
- Students: 34,412 (fall 2025)
- Undergraduates: 26,839 (fall 2025)
- Postgraduates: 6,862 (fall 2025)
- Other students: 711 (fall 2025)
- Location: Fort Collins, Colorado, United States; 40.5762°N 105.0808°W
- Campus: 4,773 acres (19.32 km^{2}); Midsize city
- Other campuses: Castle Rock; Denver
- Newspaper: Rocky Mountain Collegian
- Colors: Green and gold
- Nickname: Rams
- Sporting affiliations: NCAA Division I FBS – Pac-12
- Mascot: CAM the Ram
- Website: colostate.edu

Colorado State University (Colorado State or CSU) is a public land-grant research university in Fort Collins, Colorado, United States. It is the flagship university of the Colorado State University System. It was founded in 1870 as Colorado Agricultural College and assumed its current name in 1957. In 2024, enrollment was approximately 34,000 students, including resident and non-resident instruction students. The university has approximately 1,500 faculty in 8 colleges and 55 academic departments.

Bachelor's degrees are offered in 65 fields of study and master's degrees are offered in 55 fields. Colorado State confers doctoral degrees in 40 fields of study, in addition to a professional degree in veterinary medicine. In fiscal year 2023, CSU spent $498.1 million on research and development. It is classified among "R1: Doctoral Universities – Very high research activity".

CSU's campus includes the Engines and Energy Conversion Laboratory (EECL), the University Center for the Arts, which houses the Avenir Museum of Design and Merchandising and the Gregory Allicar Museum of Art, the James L. Voss Veterinary Teaching Hospital, and the Cooperative Institute for Research in the Atmosphere (CIRA).

The Colorado State Rams compete in the NCAA Division I Pac-12 Conference. Swimmer and six-time Olympic gold medalist Amy Van Dyken is one of CSU's most notable athletes. Other CSU alumni are Nobel Prize winners, Pulitzer Prize winners, astronauts, CEOs, Marshall Scholars and two former governors of Colorado. CSU faculty includes Fulbright Program American Scholars, members of National Academy of Sciences, National Academy of Engineering, American Academy of Arts and Sciences, and the Guggenheim fellowship.

== History ==
=== Early years ===
CSU was known at its founding as the Colorado Agricultural College. Arising from the Morrill Act of 1862, the act to create the university was signed by the Colorado Territory governor Edward M. McCook in 1870. While a board of 12 trustees was formed to "purchase and manage property, erect buildings, establish basic rules for governing the institutions and employ buildings," the near complete lack of funding by the territorial legislature for this mission severely hampered progress.

The first 30-acre (12 ha) parcel of land for the campus was deeded in 1871 by Robert Dazell. In 1872, the Larimer County Land Improvement Company contributed a second 80-acre (32 ha) parcel. The first $1000 to erect buildings was finally allocated by the territorial legislature in 1874. The funds were not, however, and trustees were required to find a matching amount, which they eventually obtained from local citizens and businesses.

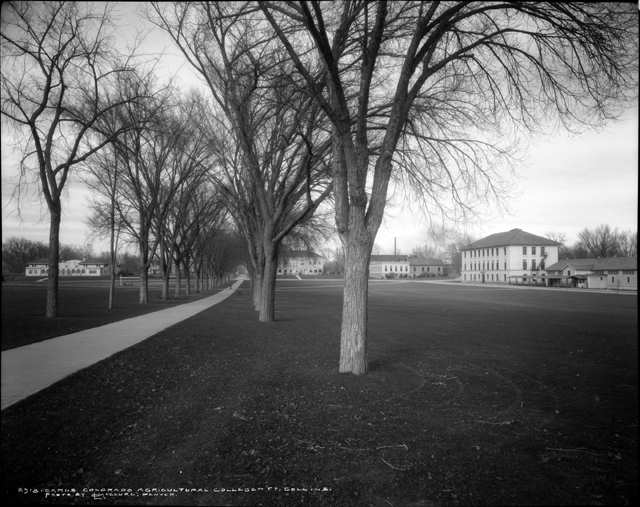
Colorado Agricultural College Campus, 1920 with the Oval, Physics Building, and Guggenheim Hall showing

Among the institutions which donated matching funds was the local Grange, which was heavily involved in the early establishment of the university. As part of this effort, in the spring of 1874, Grange No. 6 held a picnic and planting event at the corner of College Avenue and West Laurel Street, and later plowed and seeded 20 acres (80,000 m^{2}) of wheat on a nearby field. Within several months, the university's first building, a 16-foot (4.9 m)-by-24-foot red brick building nicknamed the "Claim Shanty" was finished, providing the first tangible presence of the institution in Fort Collins.

After Colorado achieved statehood in 1876, the territorial law establishing the college was required to be reauthorized. In 1877, the state legislature created the eight-member State Board of Agriculture to govern the school. Early in the 21st century, the governing board was renamed the Board of Governors of the Colorado State University System. The legislature also authorized a railroad right-of-way across the campus and a mill levy to raise money for construction of the campus' first main building, Old Main, which was completed in December 1878. Despite wall cracks and other structural problems suffered during its first year, the building was opened in time for the welcoming of the first five students on September 1, 1879, by university president Elijah Evan Edwards. Enrollment grew to 25 by 1880.

During the first term at Colorado Agricultural College in fall 1879, the school functioned more as a college-prep school than a college because of the lack of trained students. Consequently, the first course offerings were arithmetic, English, U.S. history, natural philosophy, horticulture and farm economy. Students also labored on the college farm and attended daily chapel services. The spring term provided the first true college-level instruction. Despite his accomplishments, Edwards resigned in spring 1882 because of conflicts with the State Board of Agriculture, a young faculty member, and with students. The board's next appointee as president was Charles Ingersoll, a graduate and former faculty member at Michigan State Agricultural College, who began his nine years of service at CAC with just two full-time faculty members and 67 students, 24 of whom were women.

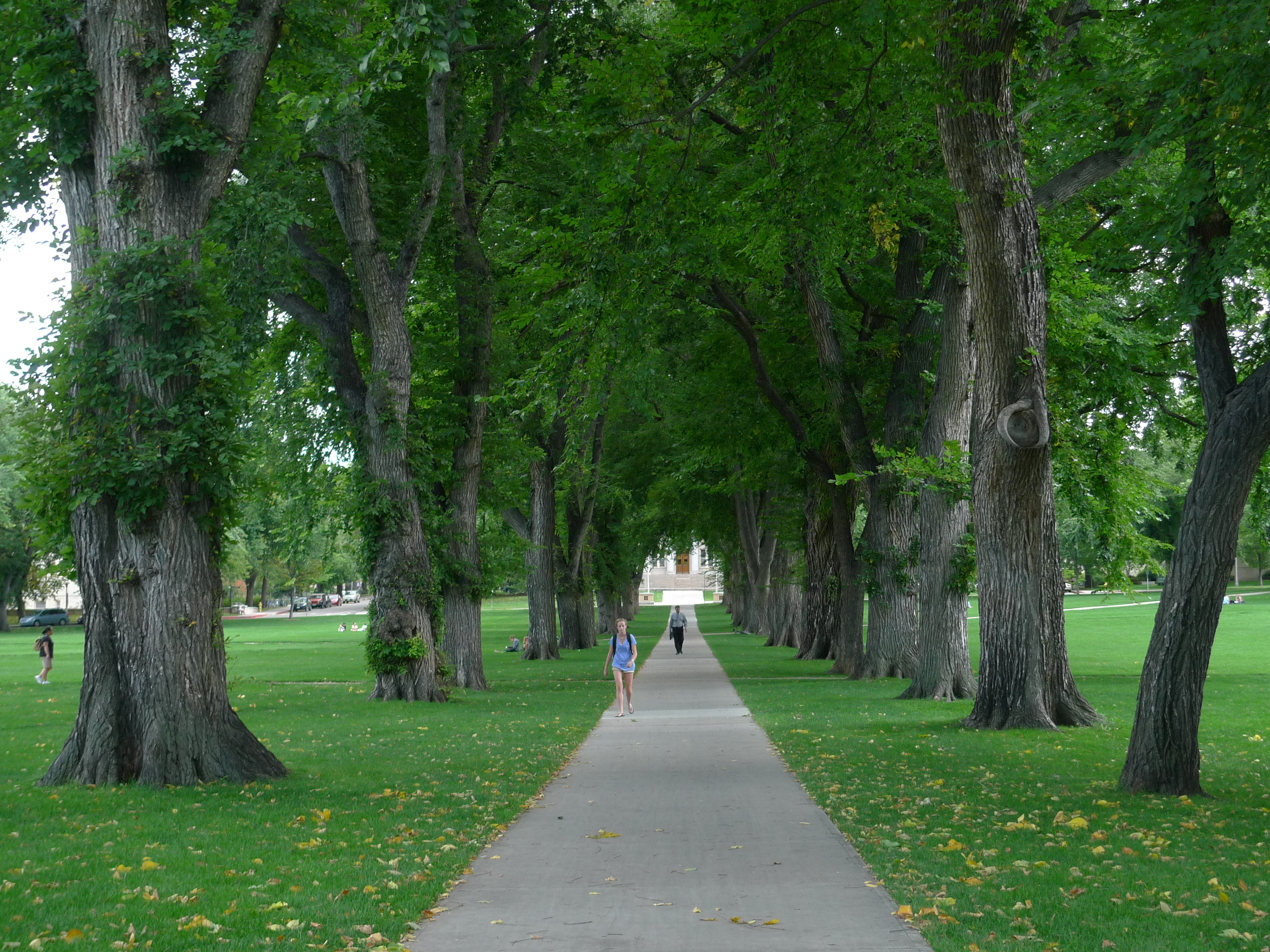
The Oval today, leading towards the Administration Building

==== President Charles Ingersoll ====
Agricultural research grew rapidly under Ingersoll. The Hatch Act of 1887 provided federal funds to establish and maintain experiment stations at land-grant colleges. Ainsworth Blount, CAC's first professor of practical agriculture and manager of the College Farm, had become known as a "one man experiment station", and the Hatch Act expanded his original station to five Colorado locations. The curriculum expanded as well, introducing coursework in engineering, animal science, and liberal arts. New faculty members brought expertise in botany, horticulture, entomology, and irrigation engineering. CAC made its first attempts at animal science during 1883–84, when it hired veterinary surgeon George Faville. Faville conducted free weekly clinics for student instruction and treatment of local citizens' diseased or injured animals. Veterinary science at the college languished for many years following Faville's departure in 1886.

President Ingersoll believed the school neglected special programs for women. Despite the reluctance of the institution's governing board, CAC began opening the door to liberal arts in 1885, and by Ingersoll's last year at CAC the college had instituted a "Ladies Course" that offered junior and senior women classes in drawing, stenography and typewriting, foreign languages, landscape gardening and psychology. Ingersoll's belief in liberal yet practical education conflicted with the narrower focus of the State Board of Agriculture, and a final clash in April 1891 led to his resignation. In 1884, CAC would celebrate the commencement of its first three graduates.

==== Professor Louis G. Carpenter ====
One of the early notable professors was Louis George Carpenter (March 28, 1861 – September 12, 1935), who was happy to be called "Professor Carp." He was a college professor and later the Dean of Engineering & Physics at Colorado State University formerly known as the Colorado Agricultural College. He was also an engineer, mathematician, and irrigation and consulting engineer.

Carpenter began teaching mathematics at Michigan State Agricultural College, and did so from 1883 to 1888.

Carpenter was recruited by President Charles Ingersoll and accepted the chair of the Engineering & Physics Department of the then Colorado Agricultural College. There, he began the first organized and systematic college program for irrigation engineering. Those completing such instruction were awarded a Bachelor of Science degree in Irrigation Engineering. Carpenter was a strong advocate for expanding education opportunities to minorities and women. He helped promote and organize newly accredited degree programs despite opposition from those unwilling to change.

Carpenter declined the Presidency of that college (later university) in 1891 and several times during his tenure. Despite difficulty to enact change, he was significant in being able to help transform the farm focused college into a university of higher learning.

In 1889, he became the director of the Colorado Agricultural Experiment Station.

Carpenter was one of the foremost leading experts on irrigation systems. He investigated irrigation systems not only in North America but also in Canada and Europe. This led to his engineering consulting and water law. He became Colorado's State Engineer, a post he held for several years while still teaching.

In 1911, Carpenter left academics and established an engineering consulting firm in Denver. This covered not only included irrigation engineering, but also consulting on hydraulic construction projects and the problems associated with such projects. He did this traveling around Canada, the United States and Western Europe with his brother running the office until his retirement in 1922. He left many papers to the university and was given an honorary doctorate before his death in 1935.

=== Turn of the 20th century ===
Colorado Agricultural College advertisement

Alston Ellis encountered limited funding and decided in 1895 to reduce the number of Experiment Stations. Female students grew in number from 44 in 1892 to 112 in 1896, and by fall 1895, the college's new domestic-economy program was in place. Football had a one-year stint at CAC in 1893, but Ellis was not a supporter of extracurricular activities and was especially hostile towards football.

Barton Aylesworth became the school's fourth president in 1899, and the combination of his non-confrontational style with the presence of the vocal Colorado Cattle and Horse Growers Association on the governing board allowed ranching and farming interests to take the college's agricultural programs to new heights, greatly influencing the development of the entire school. Initially, the influence of ranching interests brought tremendous progress to CAC's agricultural programs. Enrollment quadrupled, studies in veterinary medicine were re-established, and CAC's Experiment Station benefited from lobbying that finally secured state appropriations. Eventually, conflicts with agricultural interests may have prompted Aylesworth to begin promoting a more balanced curriculum at CAC, which he then fought hard to defend. The conflict also led him to tire and negotiate his resignation.

Aylesworth was a big supporter of extracurricular activities. Football returned to the college in fall 1899, but baseball was the school's most popular sport. In 1903, the women's basketball team won CAC's first unofficial athletic championship, culminating with a victory over the University of Colorado. New clubs, fraternities, and sororities also emerged. By 1905, the school had a fledgling music department, which two years later became the Conservatory of Music.

==== President Charles Lory ====
Taking office in 1909, CAC President Charles Lory oversaw the school's maturation and reconciled longstanding conflicts between supporters of a broad or specialized curriculum. He embarked on a demanding schedule of personal appearances to make Colorado Agricultural College known as an institution that served the state's needs. Another of Lory's notable achievements was putting the school on solid fiscal ground, meeting rising construction costs and freeing the institution of debt.

The onset of World War I influenced all aspects of CAC, but nowhere was the impact more apparent than in the institution's programs for farmers. World War I created demands for American agricultural products, and CAC established new food production committees, information services and cultivation projects to help improve food production and conservation in Colorado. World War I also drew men from campus to Europe's battlefields. In June 1916, the National Defense Act created the Reserve Officers Training Corps. A few months later CAC applied to establish an ROTC unit in Fort Collins and resurrected a defunct National Guard unit on campus.

During the early 1930s, CAC's community-wide activities were greatly influenced by the Great Depression and the Dust Bowl. The Extension Service organized relief programs for inhabitants of Eastern Colorado, of whom a survey found 20,000 to be urgently in need of food and helped sustain cropland threatened by pests and drought. President Lory sought to help Colorado farmers by pushing for major tax reforms to relieve them of high tax burdens and played a significant role in a 1930s project that supplied irrigation water for agricultural development in Eastern Colorado.

Lory and the State Board had challenges of their own back on campus. In response to claims that the university was falling behind national standards, the board retired or demoted several senior professors and administrators deemed past the peak of their proficiency and hired new doctorate-holding personnel while consolidating sections of lecture courses. A student petition led to the governing-board to change the college's name to more accurately reflect the diversity of its academic programs, and in 1935 the school became the Colorado State College of Agriculture and Mechanic Arts, or Colorado A&M for short. After 31 years of leadership, President Lory announced his retirement in 1938.

=== From World War II into the modern era ===
Soon after Pearl Harbor, Colorado A&M began to look like a military post, with the college serving as many as 1,500 servicemen. New President Roy Green tried to prepare for the sudden departure of students and arrival of servicemen by improving ROTC facilities and introducing military-training programs. Although servicemen filed onto campus, student enrollment at Colorado A&M, 1,637 in fall 1942, dropped to 701 by fall 1943, and female students outnumbered their male counterparts for the first time. When the war ceased in 1945, soldiers returning from Europe and the Pacific filled U.S. higher-education institutions. Nearly 1,040 students attended the college in fall 1946, and about 1,600 students enrolled by spring 1946. Close to 80 former "Aggies" died in World War II including football talent Lewis "Dude" Dent.

==== Colorado A&M becomes a university under Bill Morgan ====
Colorado A&M shed its image as a narrow technical college and became a university in appearance and title during the 1950s under President Bill Morgan. Providing adequate student housing for an increasing number of youth approaching college age and improving cramped instructional facilities were among the first tests of Morgan's leadership. He responded, and five new residence halls were completed between 1953 and 1957.

Academic offerings grew to include advanced degrees. The State Board of Agriculture approved a doctoral degree in civil engineering in 1951, and three years later allowed other qualified departments to offer doctorates. Morgan believed students earning this advanced degree should hold it from a university, and so began a campaign to upgrade Colorado A&M to university status. In 1957, the Colorado General Assembly approved the new name of Colorado State University.

==== 1960s: Student activism ====
Colorado State became a scene of intense student activism during the 1960s and early 1970s. The reduction of strict campus regulations for women was among the early targets of student activists, coming to the forefront in 1964 when a 21-year-old female student moved into unapproved off-campus housing to accommodate her late hours as editor of the student newspaper.

The civil-rights movement on campus also picked up momentum and visibility. In spring 1969, shortly before Morgan's retirement, Mexican American and African American student organizations presented a list of demands to university officials primarily urging increased recruitment of minority students and employees. The demonstrators' occupation of the Administration Building continued to the front lawn of Morgan's home. Students and university representatives took their concerns to state officials, but Colorado legislators rejected a subsequent university request for funds to support minority recruitment.

Anti-military protest took place in dramatic form at Colorado State from 1968 to 1970. On March 5, 1968, several hundred students and faculty with anti-war sentiments marched to Fort Collins' downtown War Memorial and wiped blood on a placard tied to the memorial. Hecklers and blockaders created such a disturbance that police had to disperse the non-marchers. In May 1970, as campus peace activists held the second day of a student strike in the gymnasium in response to the U.S. invasion of Cambodia and the student deaths at Kent State University, one or more arsonists set Old Main ablaze, destroying the 92-year-old cornerstone of Colorado State.

==== 2000s: CSU under President Penley ====
In his welcoming address for the fall 2007 semester, former CSU President Larry Edward Penley called for CSU to set the standard for the 21st century public land-grant research university. He identified as the heart of this ideal the contribution to the prosperity and quality of life of the local and international community, in part through fostering relationships and collaborations with federal research partners, the business community and key industries. A part of this approach was Colorado State's Supercluster research model, designed to utilize interdisciplinary, issue-based research on pressing global issues in which the university has particular expertise and connect research results to the marketplace. Initial Superclusters in infectious disease and in cancer research were launched. As well, new residence halls were constructed according to national green building standards, and a sustainability advisory committee was charged to coordinate green activities at Colorado State.

While maintaining historic ties to local agriculture, administration officials also emphasized the desire to better connect with the local community. As such, CSU became party to UniverCity, a multi-organization initiative that links the school with city government, community and business associations to expand and synchronize working relationships. Another goal set by the university was to improve undergraduate education. Penley stated that essential tasks were access and graduation rates, particularly for qualified low-income and minority students, and an education international in scope suited to a global economy.

Penley resigned in 2008.

==== Later 2000s: After President Penley ====
While a statistics professor at CSU, Mary Meyer declared that a study of salaries by CSU created salary goals for women faculty that were "substantially smaller than for men". This led CSU to start studying pay equity in 2015, which in turn led later that year to a quarter of female full professors receiving higher pay.

Joyce E. McConnell became the first female president of CSU in 2019. On June 9, 2022, the CSU Board of Governors and President McConnell announced she would be leaving her position as of June 30, 2022. Former Provost Rick Miranda was chosen to serve in an interim role while a new president is identified. In December 2022, the CSU Board announced the appointment of Amy Parsons, once its vice president of operations, then executive vice chancellor, as its 16th president effective Feb. 1, 2023.

== Campus ==
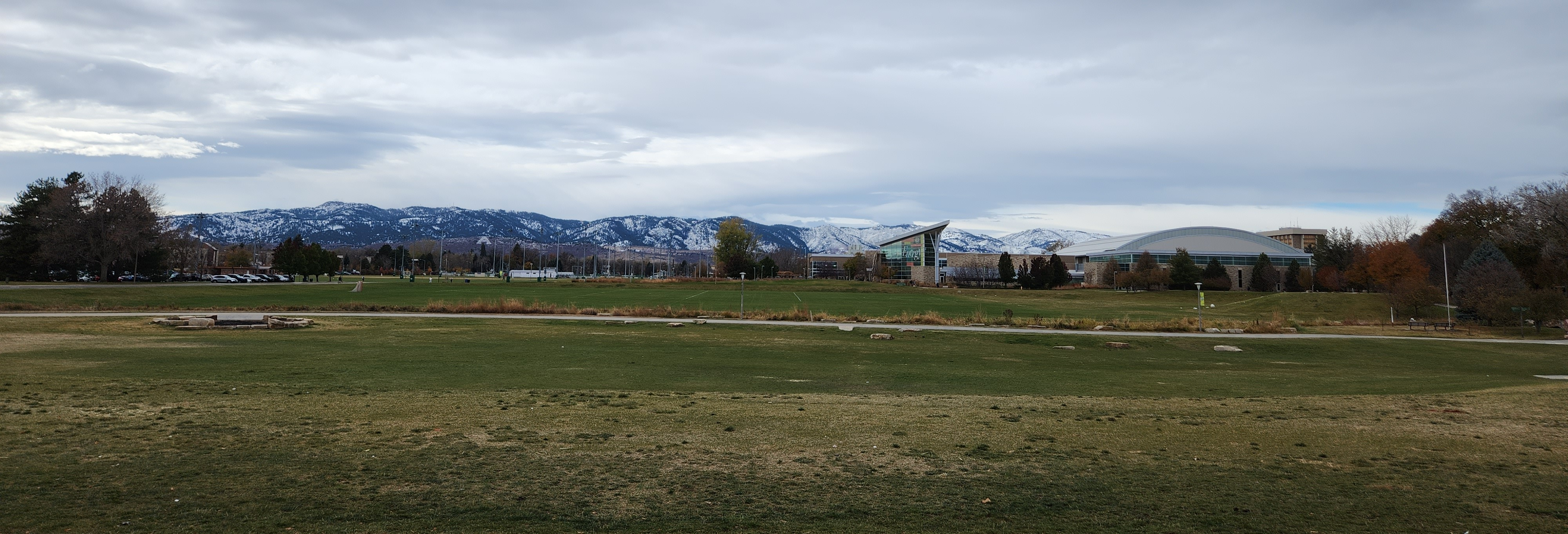
The Lagoon, Rec Center, and Intramural Fields

Colorado State University is located in Fort Collins, Colorado, a mid-size city of approximately 170,000 residents at the base of the Front Range of the southern Rocky Mountains. The university's 583-acre (2.4 km^{2}) main campus is located in central Fort Collins and includes a 101-acre (0.41 km^{2}) veterinary teaching hospital. CSU is also home to a 1,438-acre (5.8 km^{2}) Foothills Campus, a 1,575-acre (6.4 km^{2}) agricultural campus, and the 1,177-acre (4.8 km^{2}) Pingree Park mountain campus. CSU uses 4,043 acres (16.4 km^{2}) for research centers and Colorado State Forest Service stations outside of Larimer County.

=== Main campus ===
At the heart of the CSU campus lies the Oval, an expansive green area 2,065 feet (629 m) around, lined with 65 American elm trees. Designed in 1909, the Oval remains a center of activity and a major landmark at CSU. The Administration Building, constructed in 1924, faces the Oval from the south end, while several academic and administrative buildings occupy its perimeter. The Music Building, once the university library, currently houses the Institute for Learning and Teaching, which provides academic and career counseling as well as other student-focused programs. The music department moved to the University Center for the Arts upon its opening in 2008.

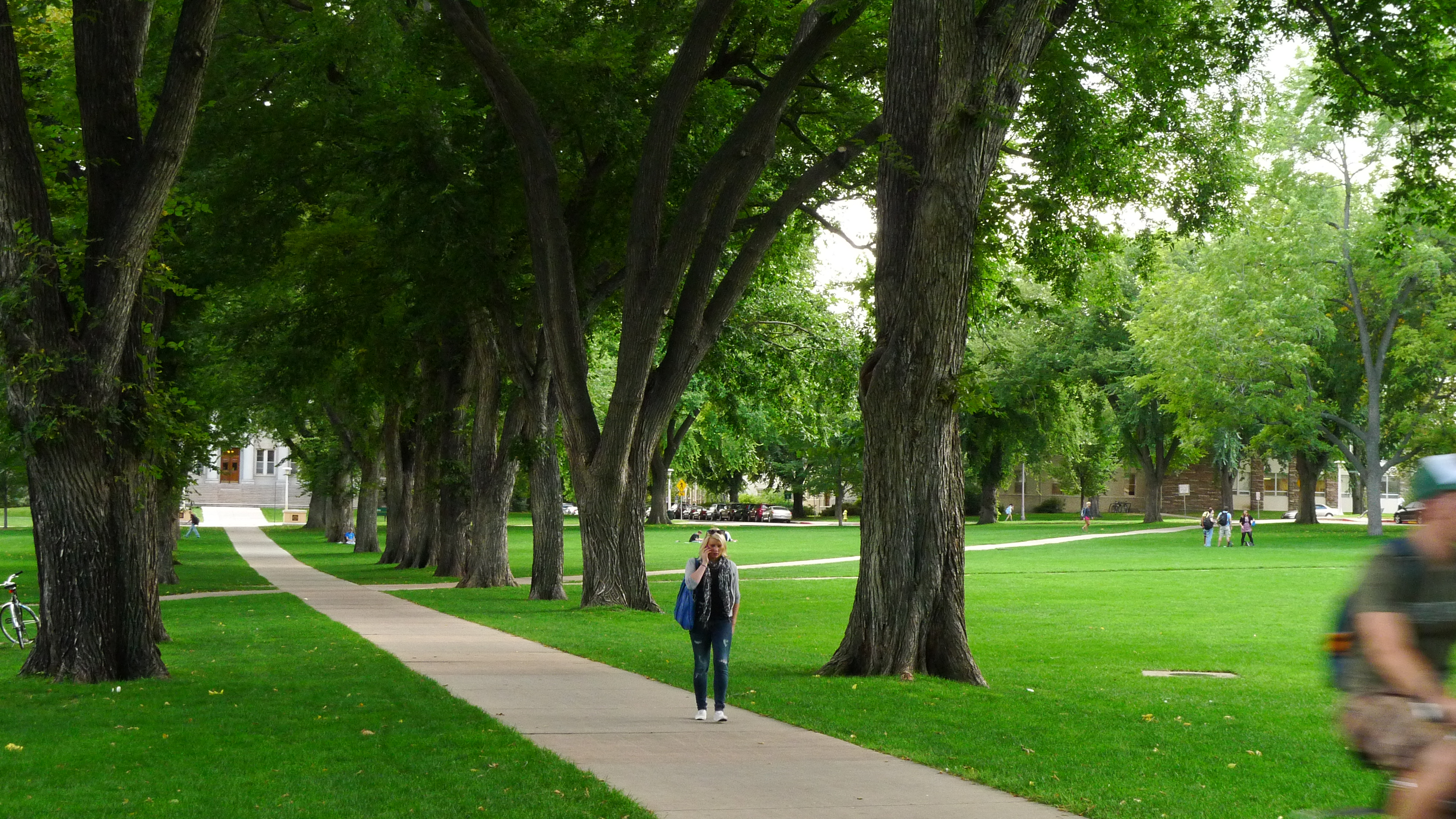
The Oval, at the heart of the CSU campus

At the northwest corner of the Oval is Ammons Hall, formerly the women's recreational center and now home to the University Welcome Center. Just to the east of Ammons stands Guggenheim Hall, which currently houses the Department of Manufacturing Technology and Construction Management. The building was constructed in 1910 as a gift from U.S. Senator Simon Guggenheim to promote the study of home economics, and was recently renovated according to green building standards. Rounding out the Oval are the Weber Building, the Statistics Building, the Occupational Therapy Building, and Laurel Hall. Another campus focal point is the main plaza, around which can be found Lory Student Center and Morgan Library, as well as several academic buildings. The Lory Student Center, named for former CSU President Charles Lory, houses Student Media, numerous organization offices, Student Government, and spaces to eat, drink and study. The Morgan Library was originally constructed in 1965 and named for former CSU President William E. Morgan. Following the flood of '97, this facility went through an extensive improvement project that included an addition to the main building and a renovation of the existing structure, with works completed in 1998. Current holdings include more than 2 million books, bound journals, and government documents. Morgan Library also contains a 13,000 sq ft (1,200 m^{2}) addition called the Study Cube that seats 80 additional patrons. With a university issued ID card, students and staff are able to access the Cube 24 hours a day, including during finals week. To accommodate, the Loan and Reserve desk checks out laptops and other accessories overnight if checked out less than six hours prior to closing.

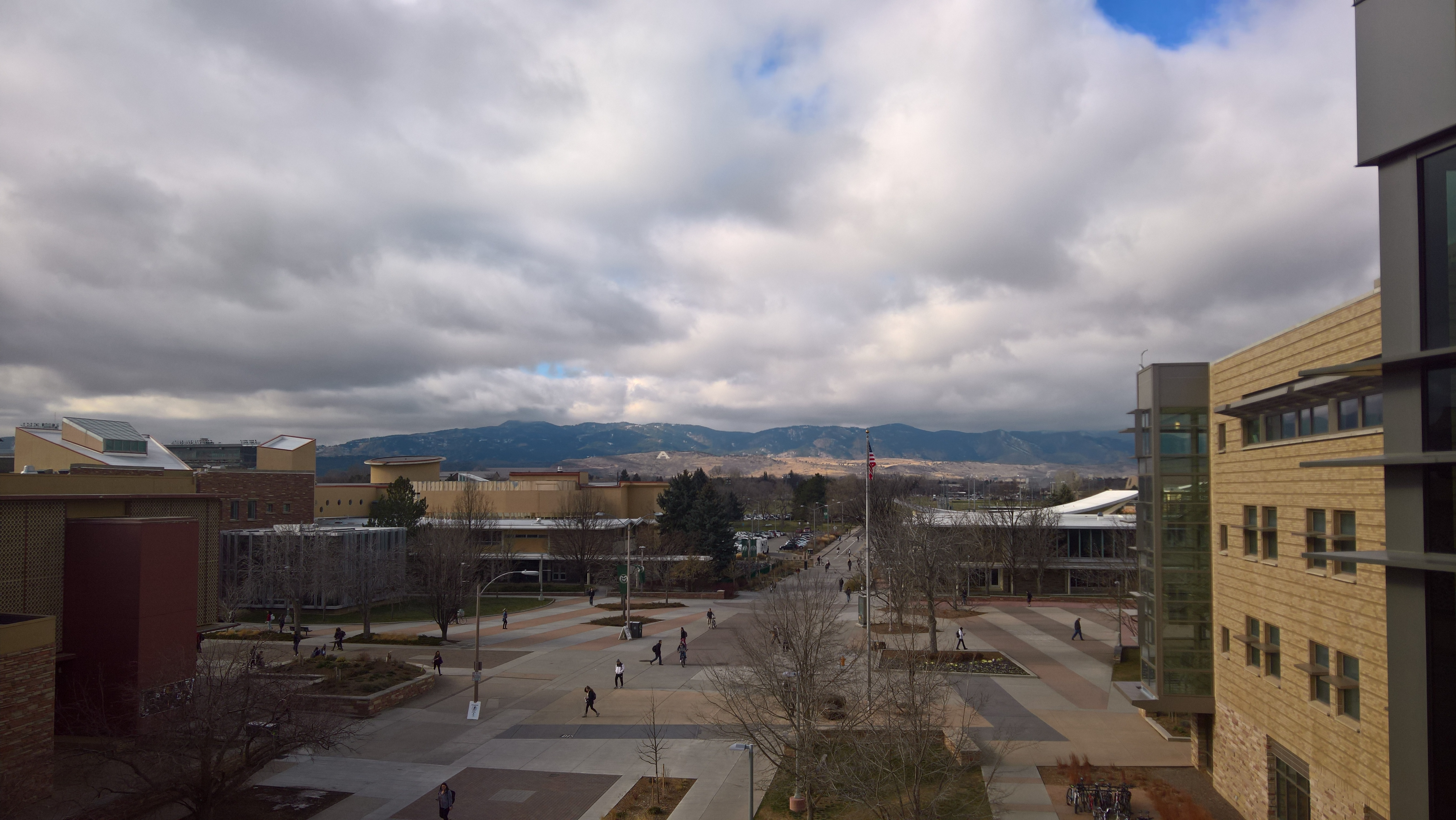
CSU Plaza overlooking from the top balcony of Natural Resource Building

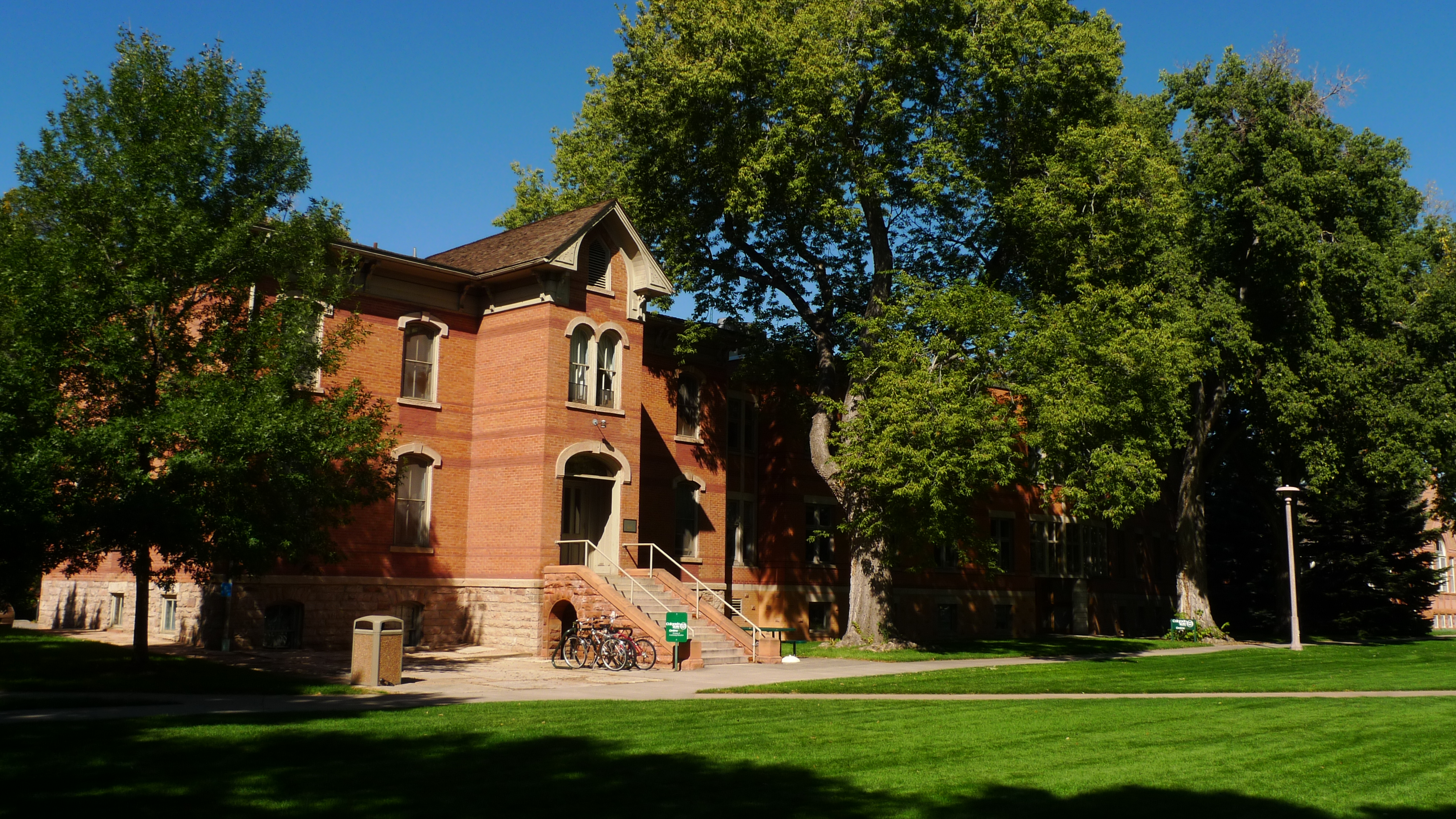
Spruce Hall, CSU's oldest existing building

Colorado State University's oldest existing building is Spruce Hall, constructed in 1881. Originally a dormitory that played a vital role in the early growth of the school's student enrollment, Spruce now houses the Division of Continuing Education and the Office of Admissions. The newest academic building on campus is the Behavioral Science building, which was completed in summer 2010. Other recent projects include the 2006 Transit Center addition to the north end of Lory Student Center (certified LEED Gold), an expansion of the Student Recreation Center, and the new Computer Science Building, completed in 2008.

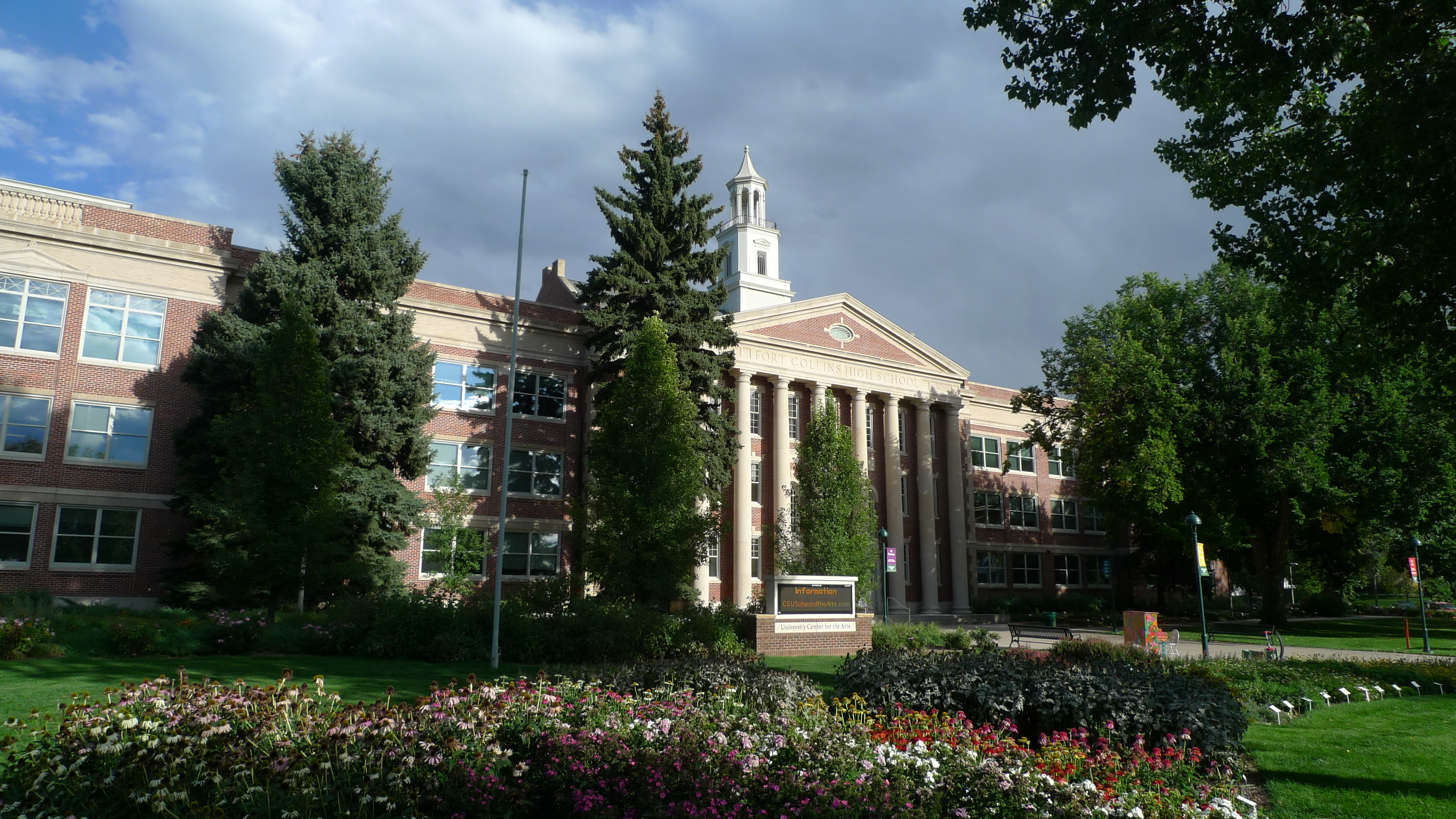
Colorado State has converted the historic Fort Collins High School building into its University Center for the Arts.

In 2008, CSU also opened its University Center for the Arts, located in the old Fort Collins High School. CSU purchased this historic building in 1995 and has since converted it into a new home for its programs in music, dance, theatre and the visual arts. The three-phase building project included a 318-seat University Theatre, a 100-seat Studio Theatre, and the 24,000 sq ft (2,200 m^{2}) Runyan Music Hall, an adaptable rehearsal and performance space created out of the old high school gymnasium. The center also houses the University Art Museum, the Avenir Museum of Design and Merchandising, a 285-seat organ recital hall, and the 200-seat University Dance Theatre.

The campus is served by Transfort bus service, including the MAX Bus Rapid Transit route that opened in 2014. The CSU Transit Center, which has stations for eleven different Transfort bus routes, is located just outside the Lory Student Center. In the summer of 2014, Transfort and CSU launched a bus route called Around the Horn, or simply Horn, that exclusively serves the campus. As of 2025, Around the Horn has 23 stations located both in CSU's main campus and the CSU Tennis Center, which is located immediately to the south.

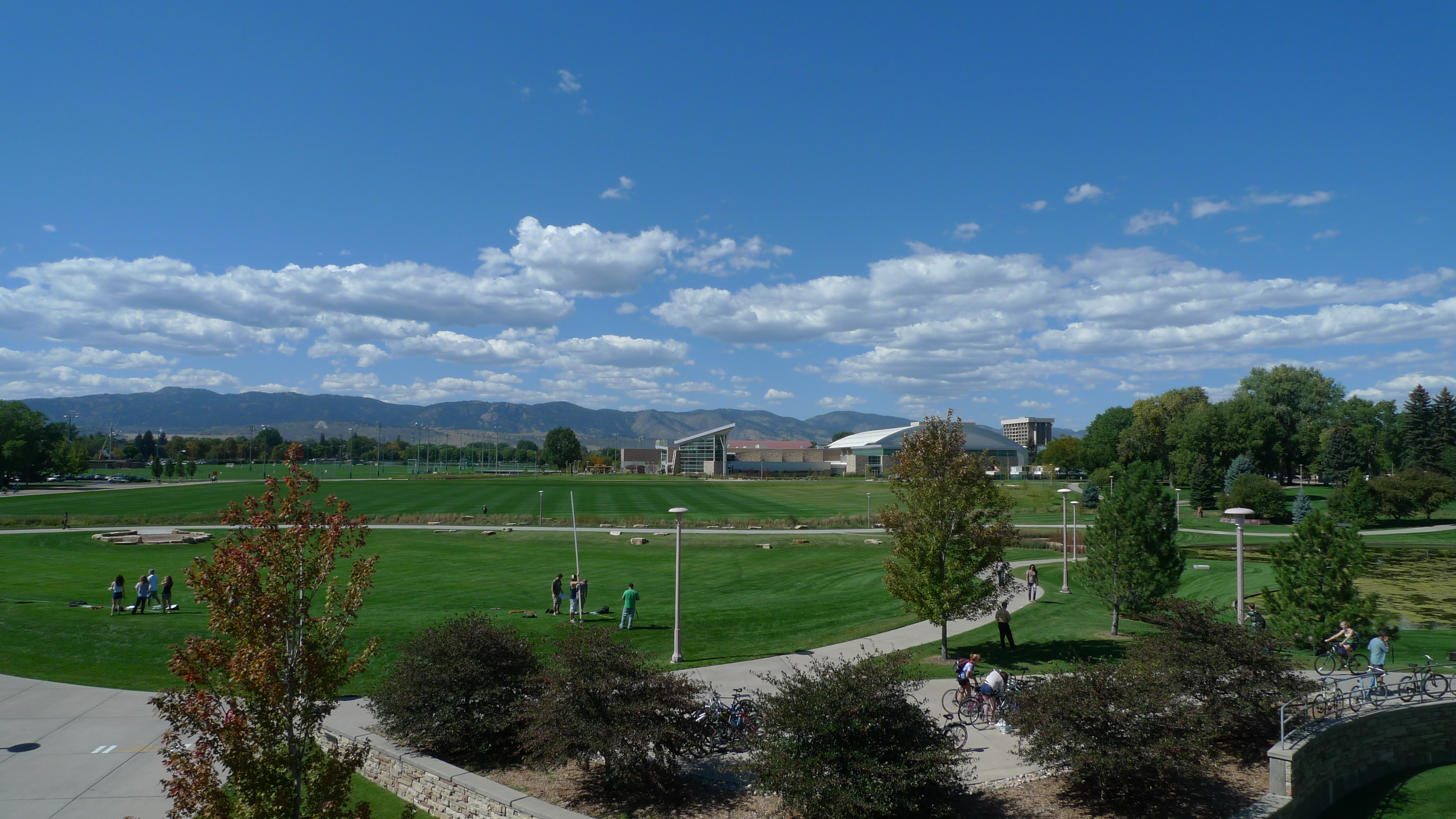
Looking west from Lory Student Center, one can see the athletic fields, the new Student Recreation Center, and the roof of Moby Arena.

=== Veterinary hospital ===
The James L. Voss Veterinary Teaching Hospital was constructed in 1979 and houses 28 specialties under one roof, ranging from emergency to oncology. Located in the Veterinary Health Complex south of the main campus in Fort Collins, the hospital has 79 veterinarians on clinics, educating 280 third- and fourth-year veterinary students on clinical rotations. In fiscal 2019, the hospital logged nearly 47,000 cases.

=== Foothills Campus ===
The 1,705-acre (6.9 km^{2}) Foothills Campus, located on northwest edge of Fort Collins, is home to the department of atmospheric sciences, as well as several research and outreach centers. The Centers for Disease Control and Prevention, Engineering Research Center, B.W. Pickett Equine Center, Cooperative Institute for Research in the Atmosphere (CIRA), the Colorado Division of Wildlife, and the Animal Reproduction Biotechnology Lab can all be found at the Foothills Campus.

== Organization ==
=== Administration ===
Colorado State University is a public land-grant institution. Its 13-member board of governors presides over the Colorado State University System, including the flagship campus in Fort Collins together with Colorado State University–Pueblo and the CSU–Global Campus. The board consists of nine voting members appointed by the Governor of Colorado and confirmed by the Colorado State Senate and four elected non-voting members. Voting members are community leaders from many fields, including agriculture, business, and public service. The student body president as well as a faculty representative from each university act as non-voting board members. Amy Parsons currently serves as the 16th president of Colorado State University.

At its December 2008 public meeting, the Board of Governors of the CSU System decided it was in the best interest of all CSU System campuses to separate what had previously been a conjoined position of CSU System Chancellor and CSU Fort Collins President. On June 1, 2015, President Emeritus Anthony "Tony" Frank, the 14th President of CSU, was named the finalist for the chancellor position.

== Academics ==
Colorado State offers 150 programs of study across 8 colleges and 55 departments. In addition to its notable programs in biomedical sciences, engineering, environmental science, agriculture, and human health and nutrition, CSU offers professional programs in disciplines including business, journalism, and construction management as well as in the liberal and performing arts, humanities, and social sciences. CSU also offers bachelor's degrees, graduate degrees, certificates, and badges online.

Fall freshman statistics

	2013	2012	2011	2010	2009	2008
Applicants	17,970	17,929	16,559	14,680	15,253	12,494
Admits	13,914	13,394	12,564	11,822	11,013	10,688
% admitted	77.4	74.7	75.8	80.5	72.2	85.5
Enrolled	4,443	4,587	4,504	4,533	4,322	4,404
Avg GPA	3.61	3.57	3.59	3.56	3.57	3.53
Avg ACT	24.7	24.8	24.7	24.5	24.6	24.1
Avg SAT composite*	1140	1143	1142	1134	1131	1120
*(out of 1600)

The university employs a total of 1,540 faculty members, with 1,000 on tenure-track appointments. The student-faculty ratio is 17:1. CSU awarded 6,090 degrees in 2009–2010, including 4,336 bachelor's degrees, 1,420 master's degrees, 203 doctoral degrees, and 131 Doctor in Veterinary Medicine degrees.

=== Institutes and centers ===
- Cooperative Institute for Research in the Atmosphere (CIRA)
- Information Science & Technology Center at Colorado State University (ISTeC)
- Energy Institute
- Public Lands History Center – In 2007, a group of CSU History and Anthropology faculty and research associates created the Center for Public History and Archaeology with the dual goal of providing practical and meaningful work experiences for graduate students and helpful collaborative projects for public agencies such as the National Park Service. In 2010, the name was changed to Public Lands History Center to better describe its focus and collaborative mission. The center's mission is to "foster the production of historical knowledge through collaborative engagement with institutions responsible for the sustainable stewardship of protected areas, water, and other critical resources." The center's Director is one of its founders, CSU Professor of History and noted environmental historian Mark Fiege.

=== Rankings ===
Academic rankings

National
- Forbes: 227
- U.S. News & World Report: 148
- Washington Monthly: 121
- WSJ/College Pulse: 291

Global
- ARWU: 201–300
- QS: =458
- THE: 401–500
- U.S. News & World Report: 311

National program rankings
Program	Ranking
Biological Sciences	62
Chemistry	51
Computer Science	83
Earth Sciences	54
Education	123
Engineering	55
Environmental Engineering	34
Civil Engineering	36
Chemical Engineering	66
Industrial Engineering	68
Computer Engineering	71
Mechanical Engineering	71
Material Engineering	75
Electrical Engineering	76
Biological Engineering	79
Fine Arts	99
Mathematics	86
Occupational Therapy	7
Physics	78
Political Science	96
Psychology	90
Social Work	51
Sociology	96
Statistics	44
Veterinary Medicine	2

Global program rankings
Program	Ranking
Agricultural Sciences	55
Biology & Biochemistry	208
Chemistry	317
Economics & Business	247
Engineering	493
Environment/Ecology	40
Geosciences	54
Microbiology	133
Mathematics	240
Meteorology and Atmospheric Sciences	34
Water Resources	100
Physics	331
Plant & Animal Science	85
Social Sciences & Public Health	238

Princeton Review named CSU's MBA program as one of the 10 best administered programs nationwide in 2007 and 2012–2015. Business Week included CSU's undergraduate business program among the best in the country in 2011, ranked at No. 89. In 2014, the College of Business moved up in the ranks to be ranked 73rd (an increase of 16 places from the previous year) in Bloomberg Business Week's undergraduate rankings.

=== Notable areas of research ===
A 1961 feasibility study at CSU was crucial for the establishment of the Peace Corps.

Research in the Engines and Energy Conversion Laboratory has created a technological solution to limit pollutants from single-stroke engines, and is now in widespread use in the Philippines. The Center for Disaster and Risk Analysis is dedicated to reducing the harm and losses caused by natural, technological, and human-caused disasters. Projects have looked at Muslim-Americans after September 11, Hurricane Katrina, the 2010 BP oil spill, and childcare disaster planning.

Outlying campuses cater to a range of research activities including crops research, animal reproduction, public health and watershed management. The Colorado Agricultural Experiment Station (CAES) was established in 1888 in accordance with provisions of the Hatch Act of 1887, calling for experiment stations at land-grant universities. State and federal funds support CAES research programs. In 2007, research activities included pest management, food safety and nutrition, environmental quality, plant and animal production systems, and community and rural development. The NSF Engineering Research Center for Extreme Ultra Violet Science and Technology, funded by the National Science Foundation, partners industry with Colorado State University, CU-Boulder, and the University of California-Berkeley. The Colorado Center for Biorefining and Biofuels (C2B2) is the first research center created under the umbrella of the new Colorado Renewable Energy Collaboratory, involving CSU, CU, Colorado School of Mines, and the National Renewable Energy Laboratory. The center develops biofuels and bio-refining technologies. Colorado State's research Supercluster model brings together researchers across disciplines to work on topics of global concern in which CSU has a demonstrated expertise. Research results are connected to the marketplace through transfer, patenting and licensing activities carried out by experts with a focus on each research area.

CSU also has a well established research program in infectious disease. The Regional Biocontainment Laboratory, funded by the National Institutes of Health, is home to scientists developing vaccines and drugs for some world's most devastating diseases. The Biocontainment Laboratory also houses one of 10 US Regional Centers of Excellence for Biodefense and Emerging Infectious Diseases, funded by a $40 million grant from the National Institute of Allergy and Infectious Diseases. Much of the Cancer Supercluster, which involves the collaboration of five colleges, is based around the work of the university's Animal Cancer Center, the largest center of its kind in the world.

=== International programs ===
Approximately 950 students per year participate in educational programs abroad, and nearly 1,300 foreign students and scholars from more than 85 countries are engaged in academic work and research on campus. The initial pilot studies for the Peace Corps were conducted by Colorado State faculty, and the university is consistently one of the top-ranking institutions in the nation for the recruitment of Peace Corps volunteers. Since 1988, CSU and the Peace Corps have participated in four cooperative master's degree programs in English, Food Science and Human Nutrition, Natural Resources, and Agriculture. The program involves at least 2 semesters of course work at CSU combined with time abroad as a Peace Corps volunteer. Colorado State offers various programs on campus for students interested in international issues. Regional specializations with core courses and electives are available in Asian Studies, Middle East/North Africa Studies, Latin American and Caribbean Studies, or Russian, Eastern and Central Europe Studies. The Global Village Living Learning Community is a housing option for students with international interests.

=== Honors Program ===
The Honors Program provides challenging and enriching programs for high achieving students in all majors through two academic tracks. One track is designed for students aiming to complete their general education requirements within the Honors Program, and a second is composed of upper division courses, usually appropriate for currently enrolled or transfer students. The Academic Village, which opened in fall 2007, offers 180 Honor students the opportunity to live in the Honors Living Learning Community.

1,126 students participated in the Honors Program in fall 2007.

== Athletics ==
Colorado State University competes in 17 sponsored intercollegiate sports, including 11 for women (cross country, indoor track, outdoor track, volleyball, basketball, golf, tennis, swimming, softball, soccer and water polo) and six for men (football, cross country, indoor track, outdoor track, basketball, and golf). Colorado State's athletic teams compete along with 8 other institutions in the Pac-12 Conference, which is an NCAA Division I conference and sponsors Division I FBS football. They were previously members of the Mountain West Conference, which was formed in 1999, splitting from the former 16-member Western Athletic Conference. CSU has won 9 MW tournament championships and won or shared 11 regular season titles. Rams football teams won or shared the Mountain West title in 1999, 2000 and 2002.

On December 13, 2011, Jim McElwain was introduced as the head football coach at Colorado State. McElwain had worked as the Alabama offensive coordinator from 2008 to 2011. On December 4, 2014, Jim McElwain accepted the head coach position at the University of Florida. This was the first time a Colorado State Rams head coach left the team for another program.

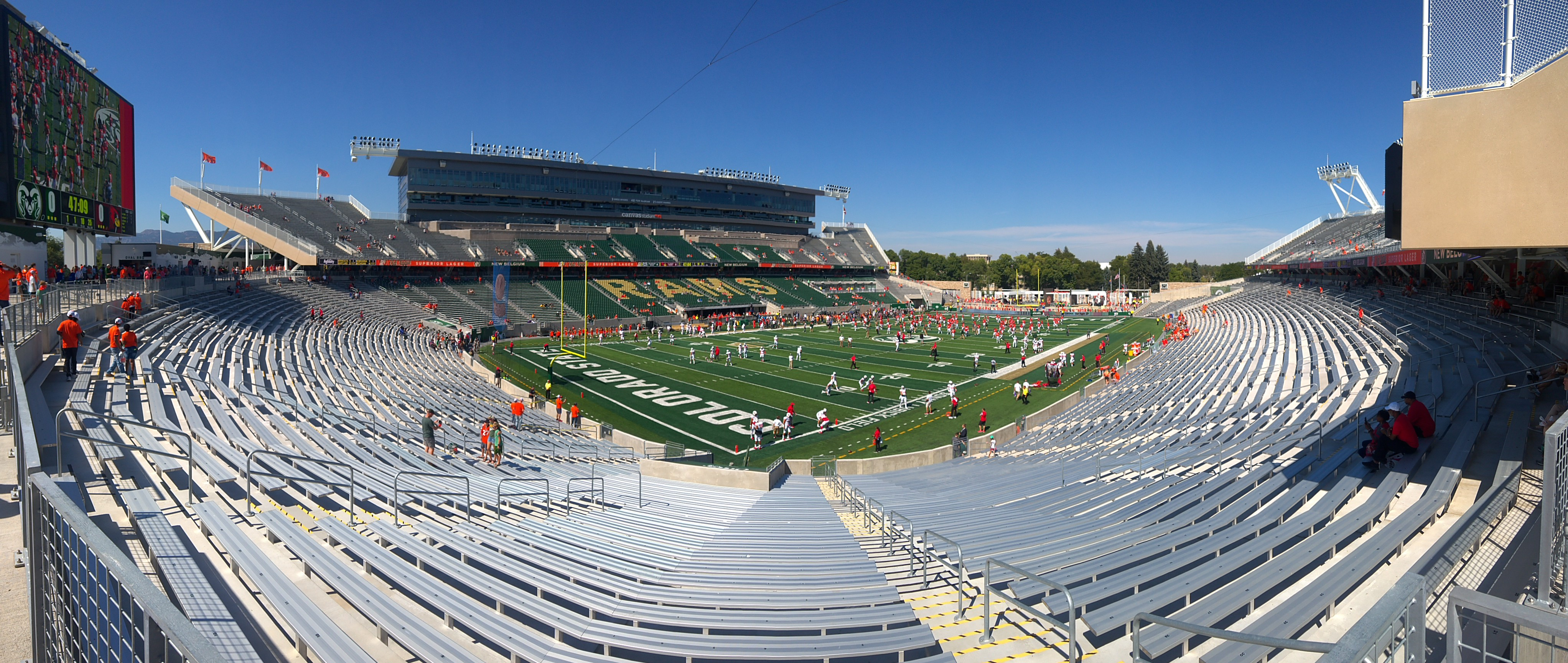
Canvas Stadium panorama

On December 5, 2014, the Colorado State University System Board of Governors gave approval to build Canvas Stadium, an on-campus multi-use stadium to replace Hughes Stadium, built several miles from campus in the 1960s.

=== Mascots ===
Over the years Colorado State University has displayed several mascots. An unknown black bear cub, often seen wearing sweaters, appeared at football games from 1909 to 1919. Purchased by a student in 1912, a bulldog named Peanuts would roam around campus. He served as a secondary mascot and was fed peanuts by the student body. On April 28, 1918, Peanuts was found poisoned. This was alleged to have been done by students of the University of Colorado Boulder, but has not been proven. After Peanuts' death, Glenn Morris, an alum of Colorado State University donated another bulldog named Gallant Defender to the university. The first ram to become the mascot of Colorado State University was Buck, introduced in 1946. Colorado State University's mascot remains the ram to this day. During a basketball game halftime contest, CAM the Ram became the name of the beloved mascot.

== Student life ==
Undergraduate demographics as of Fall 2023
Race and ethnicity	Total
White	70%
Hispanic	16%
Two or more races	5%
Asian	3%
Black	2%
International student	2%
American Indian/Alaska Native	1%
Unknown	1%
Economic diversity
Low-income (Note: The percentage of students who received an income-based federal Pell grant intended for low-income students.)	21%
Affluent (Note: The percentage of students who are a part of the American middle class at the bare minimum.)	79%

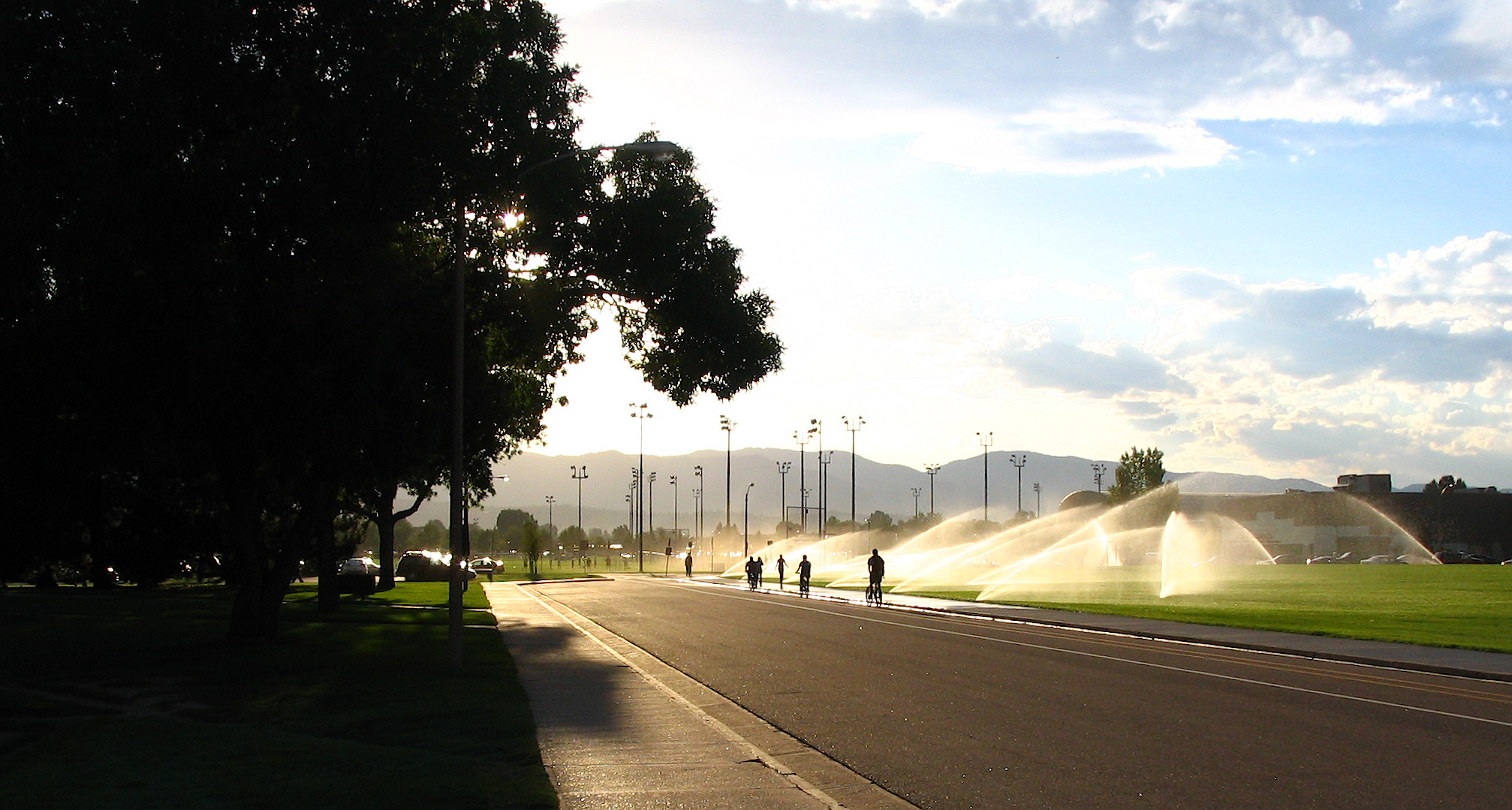
Looking west towards the Intramural Fields on CSU Campus

Fort Collins is located 65 miles (105 km) north of Denver, an approximately two-hour drive from major ski resorts and a 45-minute drive from Rocky Mountain National Park. There are opportunities for students to be active, with bike trails and hiking nearby. In 2006, Money ranked Fort Collins as the "Best Place to Live" in the United States.

=== Clubs and activities ===
There are over 450 student organizations including 34 honor societies at CSU. 60% of undergraduates participate in intramural sports while 10% join one of 19 fraternities and 14 sororities. There are 30 sport clubs, including cycling, baseball, water polo, triathlon, wrestling, and rugby. 300 music, theatre and dance performances, exhibitions, and other arts events take place on campus each year. The student government is the Associated Students of Colorado State University. CSU's daily newspaper is the Rocky Mountain Collegian. CSU also has a student-run campus television station and a student radio station, KCSU FM.

==== Sport clubs ====
Sport Clubs at Colorado State University were established in 1978. They are run and funded by student fees and team fundraisers and compete with other colleges and universities but not at the NCAA level. There are currently 30 Sport Club teams. Every year the clubs take a combined 150 trips. There are over 1,000 students associated with the program. Last year 23 of these teams competed at regional and national championships. The programs have enjoyed a significant amount of recent success with National Championships in: Men's Ice Hockey (1995) Women's Lacrosse (2008, 2010, 2011, 2013); Baseball (2004–2010); Men's Lacrosse (1999, 2001, 2003, 2006, 2012).

The sports for which there are clubs at Colorado State University are alpine skiing, baseball, bowling, crew, cycling, field hockey, horse polo (men's and women's), ice hockey (men's and women's), in-line hockey, lacrosse (men's and women's), logging sports, rodeo (men's and women's), rugby (men's and women's), shotgun sports (men's and women's), snowboard, soccer (men's and women's), swimming, synchronized ice skating, triathlon (coed), ultimate frisbee summer league, ultimate frisbee (men's and women's), volleyball, water polo (men's and women's), and wrestling (men's and women's).

==== Student media ====
The Rocky Mountain Collegian is CSU's student-run daily newspaper. The paper has a fully functional website and a mobile application, and students have complete control over editorial decisions. The paper was founded in 1891, and was a weekly publication by the 1930s. During the 1940s and 1950s, the paper earned disrepute in the local community for its unpopular support of women's rights and anti-racism stance. By the 1970s, the Collegian was consistently publishing daily. Editorial quality and financial support have varied over the years, at times rising among elite college newspapers and at others struggling to publish. During the 1990s, the paper was twice selected as one of the top 12 daily student papers in the country. In late 2007, the Collegian published a staff article that incited national debate about free speech. The article read, in its entirety, "Taser This...Fuck Bush." This event, as well as President Penley's considerations of "partnering" out the Collegian by Gannett in January 2008, led to proposals in making CSU's student media, including the Rocky Mountain Collegian, a not-for-profit organization independent from the university. This resulted in the entirety of CSU Student Media separating from the university to operate under an independent company, the Rocky Mountain Student Media Corporation.

KCSU is Colorado State's student-run station, with a format focusing on alternative and college rock music, including indie rock, punk, hip-hop, and electronic music. News, sports, and weather updates along with talk programs and specialty shows round out the programming schedule. Broadcasting at 10,000 watts, KCSU is among the larger college stations in the country, reaching approximately 250,000 listeners. KCSU first began broadcasting in 1964 as a station owned, operated, and financed by students. Following a long period as a professional station, KCSU again became student-run in 1995, at which time the current format was adopted. As with the Collegian and CTV, KCSU was hit hard by the 1997 flood, and for a time was forced to broadcast from remote locations. Now back in its original Lory Student Center location, KCSU has benefited from revamped production facilities and updated equipment.

CTV is CSU's student-run television station, that allows students to hone their media skills- reporting, writing, producing, shooting, editing- in an educational environment. The station is a winner of fourteen Rocky Mountain Collegiate Media Association awards and a Student Emmy Award from the National Academy of Television Arts and Sciences Heartland Chapter. Content includes news shows on Tuesdays and Wednesdays, a sports show on Mondays, and an entertainment show Thursdays. CTV was founded in 1989, and currently broadcasts weeknights on the university cable station (Comcast channel 11) at 8 pm, with reruns at 9 am and noon the next day.

Student-run magazine College Avenue was founded in 2005 with the goal, as put forth by its founding editors, of giving students a new forum to address controversial issues affecting the campus community from their vantage point. Since its first issue in the fall of 2005, the magazine has been released quarterly.

==== Greek life ====
Greek life at Colorado State began in the fall of 1915. Currently, 10% of undergraduates join one of CSUs 19 fraternities and 14 sororities. The CSU Inter-Fraternity Council acts as the governing body for the 19 fraternities, each with a delegate representative. Similarly, the CSU Panhellenic Council governs the sororities. CSU Greek organizations are involved in several philanthropic activities around campus, among them CSUnity, Cans around the Oval, Habitat for Humanity, and RamRide. The governing bodies recently raised $25,000 towards the sponsorship of a Habitat for Humanity home.

From 1932 until 1949, Colorado State University was home to the Eta chapter of Phrateres, a philanthropic-social organization for female college students. Eta was the seventh chapter installed and Phrateres eventually had over 20 chapters in Canada and the United States. (The chapter name "Eta" was reused for the chapter installed at Arizona State University in 1958.)

=== Residence halls ===
13 residence halls provide on-campus living for over 5,000 students. First-year students are required to live in one of the halls on campus, and upperclassman and graduate living are offered in the university-owned Aggie Village, which has space for 973 individuals. The halls also have several Living-Learning communities that directly link the on-campus living environment with a specific academic focus in Honors, engineering, natural sciences, health and wellness, equine sciences, leadership development, or pre-veterinary medicine. The Key Academic and Key Service Communities create an academically focused residential community for freshmen who share a desire for academic achievement, active involvement in classes, community service, campus activities, and appreciation of diversity. Residents share classes and take advantage of yearlong service opportunities with a close-knit group of 19 other students.

CSU Honors Program participants have the opportunity to live in the Honors Living Community. Academic Village, which opened in the fall 2007, houses Living Learning Communities for 180 Honors and 240 Engineering students. Students in the College of Natural Sciences can choose to live in Laurel Village, which opened in fall 2014.

=== University apartments ===
Students, faculty, and staff may choose to live in the university apartments. Colorado State University University Housing oversees University Village, International House, Aggie Village Family, and Aggie Village. Known as a "global community" Apartment Life's mission to diversity shows in the fact that approximately 60 percent of residents and staff are from 80 different nations. Residents of CSU and Fort Collins community members enjoy a diverse amount of enrichment programs offered through the University Housing staff.

=== Student demographics ===
In fall 2007, CSU opened its doors to 24,983 students, among them 20,765 undergraduates, 2,332 master's students, 1,347 doctoral students, and 539 professional students in the College of Biomedical and Veterinary Medicine. 80% of undergraduates are Colorado residents, and within the student population 50 states and 79 countries are represented. 52% of undergraduates are women, 13.2% of undergraduates are ethnic minorities (excluding international students), and 3% of undergraduates are 30 and over. Of minority students, 48% are Hispanic, 24% Asian American, 16% African American, and 12% Native American. Over the past ten years, minority enrollment has increased 35%, from 2,361 to 3,178, an increase from 10.9% to 13.2% of the student population. Though progress has been made, increasing minority enrollment at CSU has been a challenge for school administrators, one made yet more difficult by high dropout rates in many Colorado high schools with concentrated minority populations.

== Notable alumni and faculty ==
See the List of Colorado State University people.

== See also ==
- Colorado State University Pueblo
- List of colleges and universities in Colorado
- List of forestry universities and colleges
- Bibliography of Colorado
- Geography of Colorado
- History of Colorado
- Index of Colorado-related articles
- List of Colorado-related lists
- Outline of Colorado
