= Colorado State University–Global Campus =

Online public university in Colorado, U.S.

- Other name: CSU Global
- Former name: CSU-Colorado
- Type: Public online university
- Established: 2007; 19 years ago
- Parent institution: Colorado State University System
- Accreditation: HLC
- President: Audra Spicer (interim)
- Students: 13,239 (fall 2025)
- Location: Denver, Colorado, United States
- Campus: Online
- Mascot: Goldie D Golden Eagle
- Website: www.csuglobal.edu

Colorado State University–Global Campus (CSU Global) is a public online university with its headquarters in Denver, Colorado, United States. It was founded in 2007 as the first statutorily defined, fully online state university in the country. It is a member of the Colorado State University System and is accredited by the Higher Learning Commission. CSU Global offers undergraduate and graduate degree and certificate programs.

== History ==
Colorado State University - Global Campus (CSU – Global) is the newest institution in the Colorado State University System (CSUS), a university system with a 155-year history that evolved from agrarian roots as a land-grant institution.

In 2007, the Colorado State University System Board of Governors determined to create an exclusively online university within the system to meet the educational needs of adult learners by providing high quality online programs. The university was originally proposed under the name CSU-Colorado but the name was changed to Colorado State University - Global Campus ahead of its formal establishment. It is colloquially known as CSU - Global within the CSU System, which aligns with its sister institutions, CSU - Fort Collins and CSU - Pueblo.

On May 7, 2008, the System Board of Governors delegated authority to CSU – Global to oversee academic, personnel, and financial matters consistent with powers granted to CSU and CSU – Pueblo. Thereafter, CSU – Global was legally sanctioned as a third, independent University on March 18, 2009, when Colorado governor Bill Ritter signed into law the State of Colorado Senate Bill 09-086 declaring the establishment of the Colorado State University – Global Campus as an online university that is part of the Colorado State University System.

CSU Global was granted a $12 million loan from the CSU Board of Governors in August 2007 for the establishment of the university. CSU Global completed the repayment of the originating loan in June 2012. CSU Global is unique within the CSU System in that it does not receive state funding.

=== Presidents ===
- Becky Takeda-Tinker (2010-2020)
- Pamela Toney (2020-2023)
- Becky Takeda-Tinker (2023-2026)
- Audra Spicer (2026-present)

== Academics ==
CSU Global academic programs are designed to enable learners to combine previously acquired college credit with CSU Global online courses to meet academic requirements for innovative career-specific degree and certificate programs. The university offers 23 undergraduate degree programs (with 40 undergraduate specializations), 20 undergraduate certificate programs, 18 master's degree programs (with 28 graduate specializations) and 9 graduate certificate programs. CSU-Global is accredited by the Higher Learning Commission. It was the first public university in Colorado to receive initial HLC accreditation since 1971.
