= Ashcraft =

Ashcraft is a surname. Reaney and Wilson have suggested this is a place-related surname referring to "dweller at a croft with an ash-tree"; a "croft" refers to a small parcel of land used for farming.

Notable people with the surname include:

- Alan E. Ashcraft Jr. (1906–1961), American politician and judge
- Braxton Ashcraft (born 1999), American baseball player
- Forrest Ashcraft (1922–2004), American politician
- Graham Ashcraft (born 1998), American baseball player
- Hale Ashcraft (1920–2010), American politician
- Karen Ashcraft (living), American academic
- Mark H. Ashcraft (1949–2022), American academic
- Percy Ashcraft (living), American politician and local government official
- Richard Ashcraft (1938–1995), American academic
- Tami Oldham Ashcraft (born 1960), American sailor and author
- Thomas Ashcraft (born 1951), American astronomer, naturalist, scientific instrument-maker, artist

== See also ==
- Doki Doki Literature Club!, a 2017 video game, for which Jillian Ashcraft sang "Your Reality"
