= University of Colorado Denver =

Public university in Denver, Colorado, US

- Former names: University of Colorado's Department of Correspondence & Extension (1912–1965); University of Colorado–Denver Center (1965–1973); University of Colorado Denver & Health Sciences Center (2004–2007)
- Motto: λαμψατω το φώς υμών (Greek)
- Motto in English: Let Your Light Shine
- Type: Public research university
- Established: 1912; 114 years ago (Note: 1912 is the year the University of Colorado's Department of Correspondence and Extension, which would evolve into the University of Colorado at Denver (CU-Denver), was established. CU's Department of Medicine and Surgery, which would evolve into UCHSC, was established much earlier, in 1883. The merging of CU-Denver and UCHSC, to form the University of Colorado Denver, took place in 2004.)
- Parent institution: University of Colorado system
- Academic affiliations: CUMU; ORAU; USU
- Endowment: $593 million (systemwide)
- Chancellor: Kenneth Christensen
- President: Todd Saliman
- Provost: Karen Marrongelle
- Faculty: 1,065 (fall 2025)
- Students: 13,654 (fall 2026)
- Undergraduates: 9,606 (fall 2026)
- Postgraduates: 4,048 (fall 2026)
- Location: Denver, Colorado, United States
- Campus: 126-acre (0.5 km^{2}) (with Metropolitan State University of Denver and Community College of Denver combined); Urban
- Newspaper: The Sentry
- Colors: Black & gold
- Nickname: Lynx
- Mascot: Milo the Lynx
- Website: www.ucdenver.edu

The University of Colorado Denver (CU Denver) is a public research university in downtown Denver, Colorado, United States. It is part of the University of Colorado system. Established in 1912 as an extension of the University of Colorado Boulder, CU Denver attained university status and became an independent institution in 1973. CU Denver is classified among R1: Doctoral Universities – Very High Research Activity. The university's graduate programs award more master's degrees than any other institution in the state, serving roughly 5,000 students annually. CU Denver makes up one-third of the Auraria Campus in downtown Denver, along with the Metropolitan State University of Denver and the Community College of Denver.

== History ==
=== University of Colorado Anschutz ===
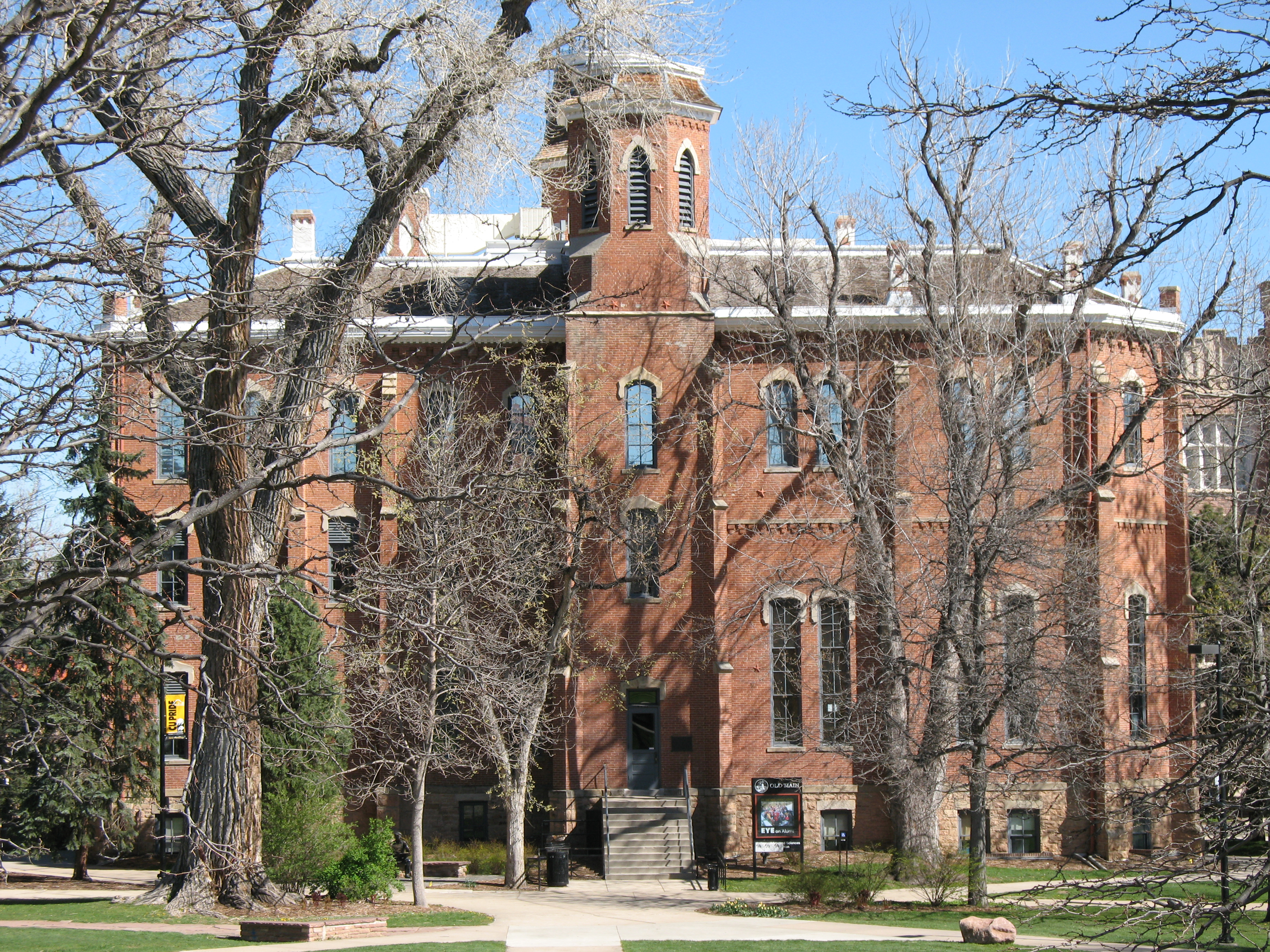
Old Main in Boulder, where the School of Medicine first started

The University of Colorado created the Department of Medicine and Surgery in September 1883 in the Old Main building on the Boulder campus. The Department of Nursing opened in 1898.

By 1892, the last two years of classes were taught in Denver because the larger population afforded more practical experience. This practice triggered something of a turf battle with the University of Denver's medical school and the subsequent legal battle went to the state Supreme Court. In 1897, the court found that CU's charter restricted them to Boulder. However, in 1910, CU got an amendment to the state Constitution passed which allowed them to move back to Denver. In 1911, the School of Medicine combined with the Denver and Gross Medical College to form a larger school with a more comprehensive program, paving the way for the school's permanent move to Denver. In 1925, the School of Medicine moved to the campus on Ninth Avenue and Colorado Boulevard in Denver. This would become the University of Colorado Health Sciences Center (UCHSC).

In 1995, the Fitzsimons Army Medical Center was officially put on the Base Realignment and Closure list, after which officials from the Health Sciences Center, University of Colorado Hospital and the City of Aurora presented a proposal to the Department of Defense in Washington, D.C., to repurpose the decommissioned base as an academic health center. In 1999, the Army base was closed under the 1995 Base Realignment and Closure action. In 2004, the first UCHSC labs moved from Denver to the research towers on the Fitzsimons campus. In 2006, the Fitzsimons campus of UCHSC was renamed CU Anschutz in recognition of philanthropic donations from Philip and Nancy Anschutz. By the end of 2008, academic and research operations of all CU Denver health sciences schools and colleges relocated from the Ninth Avenue and Colorado Boulevard campus to the new CU Anschutz campus, joining the affiliated University of Colorado Hospital and Children's Hospital.

=== University of Colorado Denver ===
The University of Colorado Denver began as the Extension Center of University of Colorado's Department of Correspondence and Extension, which was established in 1912. In 1938, the Extension Center acquired permanent quarters in Denver in the C.A. Johnson Building at 509 17th Street, where a single, full-time faculty member ran the school with the help of part-time teachers. In 1947, the Extension Center moved into the Fraternal Building at 1405 Glenarm Place. In 1956, the university acquired the Denver Tramway Company Building at 14th and Arapahoe Streets (now the Hotel Teatro and the Denver Center for the Performing Arts Tramway building). In 1964, the Extension Center was renamed the University of Colorado – Denver Center. On January 11, 1973, lawmakers, upon proclamation of the governor, amended the state constitution to establish additional CU campuses, transforming the University of Colorado—Denver Center into the University of Colorado Denver (CU Denver).

Between 1973 and 1976, the State of Colorado built the Auraria Higher Education Center (AHEC) on a 127-acre (0.51 km^{2}) downtown campus to be shared by the University of Colorado Denver, the Metropolitan State University of Denver and the Community College of Denver. In 1977, the Denver campus expanded to the newly opened AHEC, and later to several buildings extending into downtown Denver.

=== Merger, subsequent separation, and renaming ===
In the summer of 2004, the University of Colorado Denver and the University of Colorado Health Sciences Center merged to create the University of Colorado Denver and Health Sciences Center (UCDHSC). On October 29, 2007, the board of regents voted to rename UCDHSC the "University of Colorado Denver", consisting of the CU Anschutz and Denver Campuses. In August 2011, the regents approved a name change to the "University of Colorado Denver | Anschutz Medical Campus" (including the vertical bar), while the legal name of the dual institution remained "University of Colorado Denver".

However, in 2014, the University of Colorado appointed separate chancellors for the University of Colorado Denver and the University of Colorado Anschutz, effectively separating the two campuses. The campuses offer some dual campus programs, but CU Anschutz is independently referred to as "CU Anschutz" or "University of Colorado Anschutz" in official materials, and the Denver Campus is independently referred to as "CU Denver" in official materials. The marketing campaign ALL FOUR:COLORADO emphasizes the distinct identities of the CU Denver and CU Anschutz campuses alongside the other CU institutions, Boulder and Colorado Springs.

=== Beall's List ===
The university was known for its association with Beall's List, created by its former faculty member Jeffrey Beall and used by universities worldwide, and ultimately for the role the university played in the disappearance of the list. In an interview in 2018, Beall stated that "my university began to attack me in several ways. They launched a research misconduct investigation against me (after seven months, the result of the investigation was that no misconduct had occurred). They also put an unqualified, mendacious supervisor over me, and he constantly attacked and harassed me. I decided I could no longer safely publish the list with my university threatening me in these ways."

== Campuses ==
=== CU Denver Campus ===
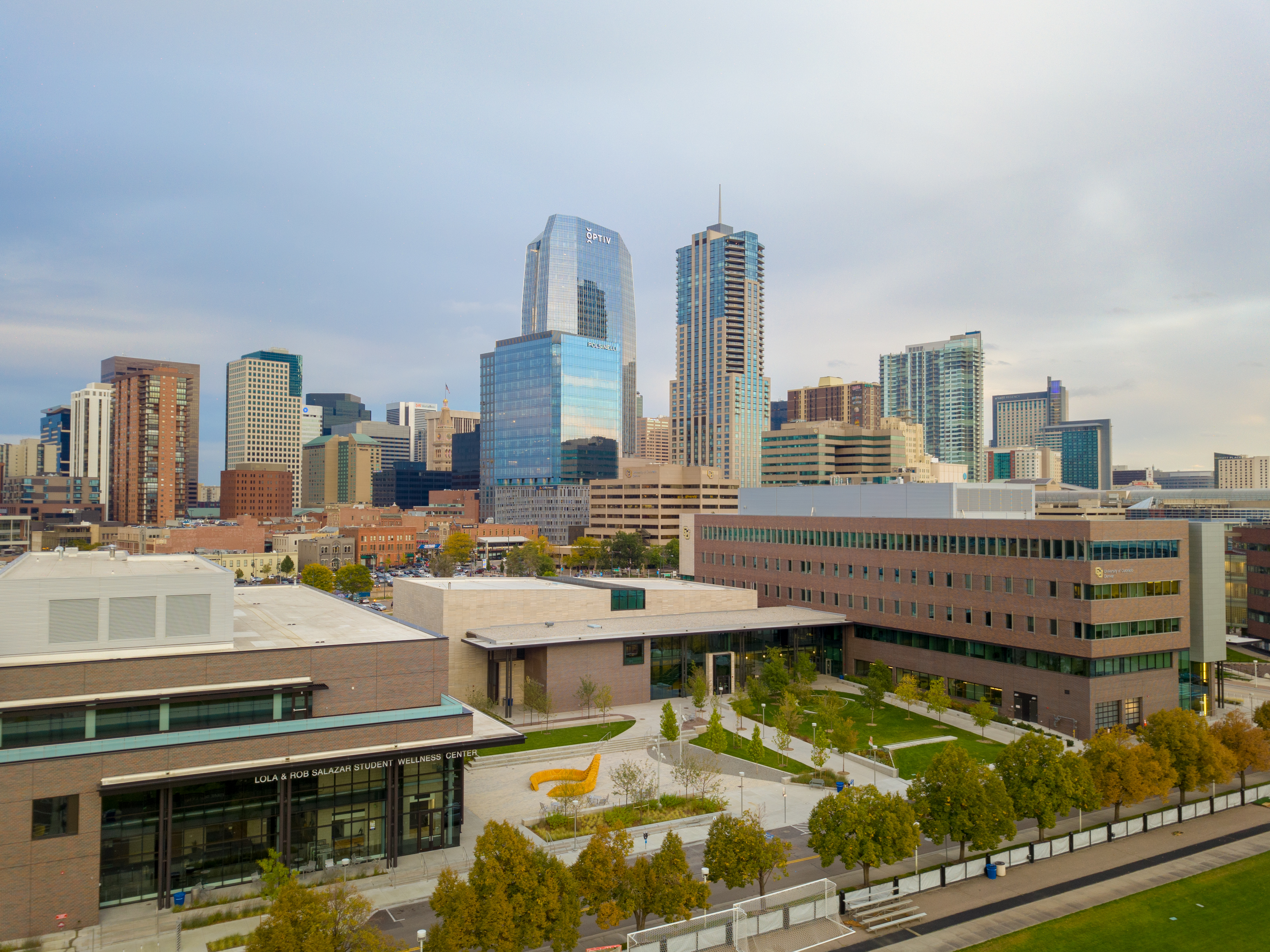
The Lola and Rob Salazar Student Wellness Center (left) and Student Commons Building (right) on the downtown Denver campus

CU Denver, part of the Auraria Campus, is located to the southwest of downtown Denver in the Auraria Neighborhood, on Speer Boulevard and Auraria Parkway. In a unique arrangement, CU Denver shares certain facilities (such as the Tivoli Student Union) on the Auraria Campus with two additional institutes of higher education, Metropolitan State University of Denver and the Community College of Denver. Proprietary facilities such as the CU Denver Student Commons Building are not shared. CU Denver Regional Transportation District's (RTD) Light Rail has two stops on the Auraria Campus: Colfax at Auraria and Auraria West Campus.

A student wellness center opened in Summer of 2018.

CU Denver features both undergraduate and graduate courses, with graduate students making up 32 percent of enrolled students. The campus is located in the heart of the central business district and is in close proximity to the Ball Arena, Elitch Gardens, the Colorado Convention Center, the Denver Center for the Performing Arts, Larimer Square, and the 16th Street Mall. The reclaimed Tivoli brewery, which closed in 1969, houses the student union.

== Enrollment ==
Undergraduate demographics as of Fall 2023
Race and ethnicity	Total
White	38%
Hispanic	28%
International student	10%
Asian	11%
Black	7%
Two or more races	6%
Unknown	1%
Economic diversity
Low-income (Note: The percentage of students who received an income-based federal Pell grant intended for low-income students.)	33%
Affluent (Note: The percentage of students who are a part of the American middle class at the bare minimum.)	67%

In addition to on campus students, the university had an additional 11,000 online students in fall 2019. 76% of the student population were full-time students, 16% were out-of-state residents, and international students made up 6% of total enrollment. 15,490 students were enrolled at CU. 41% of undergraduate students and 55% of new freshmen at CU Denver belonged to an ethnic minority. The average entering ACT score for new freshmen at CU Denver was 22.9 composite. The average entering SAT scores at CU Denver was 549 Math and 542 Verbal. The average high school GPA for new freshmen was 3.37. The most popular undergraduate majors at CU Denver were biology, psychology, pre-engineering, music, and economics. International students on the campus arrived from 125 countries. The 2020 average 6-year graduation rate was 48%.

The CU Denver campus had 14,000 enrolled students as of fall 2022. 52 percent of undergraduate students and 25 percent of graduate students belong to minority groups. U.S. News gives the school a diversity index rating of 0.68, ranking 75th of national universities.

== Academics ==
University of Colorado Denver has the largest graduate business school and graduate school of education in Colorado.

=== Libraries ===
The Auraria library on the CU Denver campus downtown serves the three institutions that share the campus—CU Denver, Metropolitan State University of Denver and Community College of Denver. The library houses nearly 1 million print books, 130,000 e-books, 44,000 e-journals and 300 databases.

=== Schools and colleges ===
The university offers degrees in a wide variety of academic fields such as music industry, engineering, business, film & television, culture, history, language, digital design, the natural sciences, and biomedical sciences. CU Denver hosts 8 schools and colleges:

- College of Architecture and Planning
- College of Arts & Media
- The Business School
- School of Education & Human Development
- College of Engineering, Design, and Computing
- College of Liberal Arts and Sciences
- School of Public Affairs and its Presidential Climate Action Project
- Graduate School.

The College of Liberal Arts and Sciences is CU Denver's largest school offering 23 baccalaureate degrees, 17 master's degrees, and 4 PhD programs. The College of Arts & Media is home to The Music & Entertainment Industry Studies (MEIS) Department, the largest music department in the Rocky Mountain Region. The College of Architecture and Planning is located on 14th street, offering graduate degrees in architecture, urban design, historic preservation, urban and regional planning, and landscape architecture. In the engineering areas, the downtown campus has worked with Lockheed Martin and Raytheon.

==== School of Medicine for the University of Colorado System ====
The University of Colorado School of Medicine is the medical school of the University of Colorado system. It is separate from the University of Colorado Denver, located at CU Anschutz in Aurora, Colorado, one of the four University of Colorado system campuses. The medical school and CU Denver offer some dual programs.

==== College of Arts & Media ====
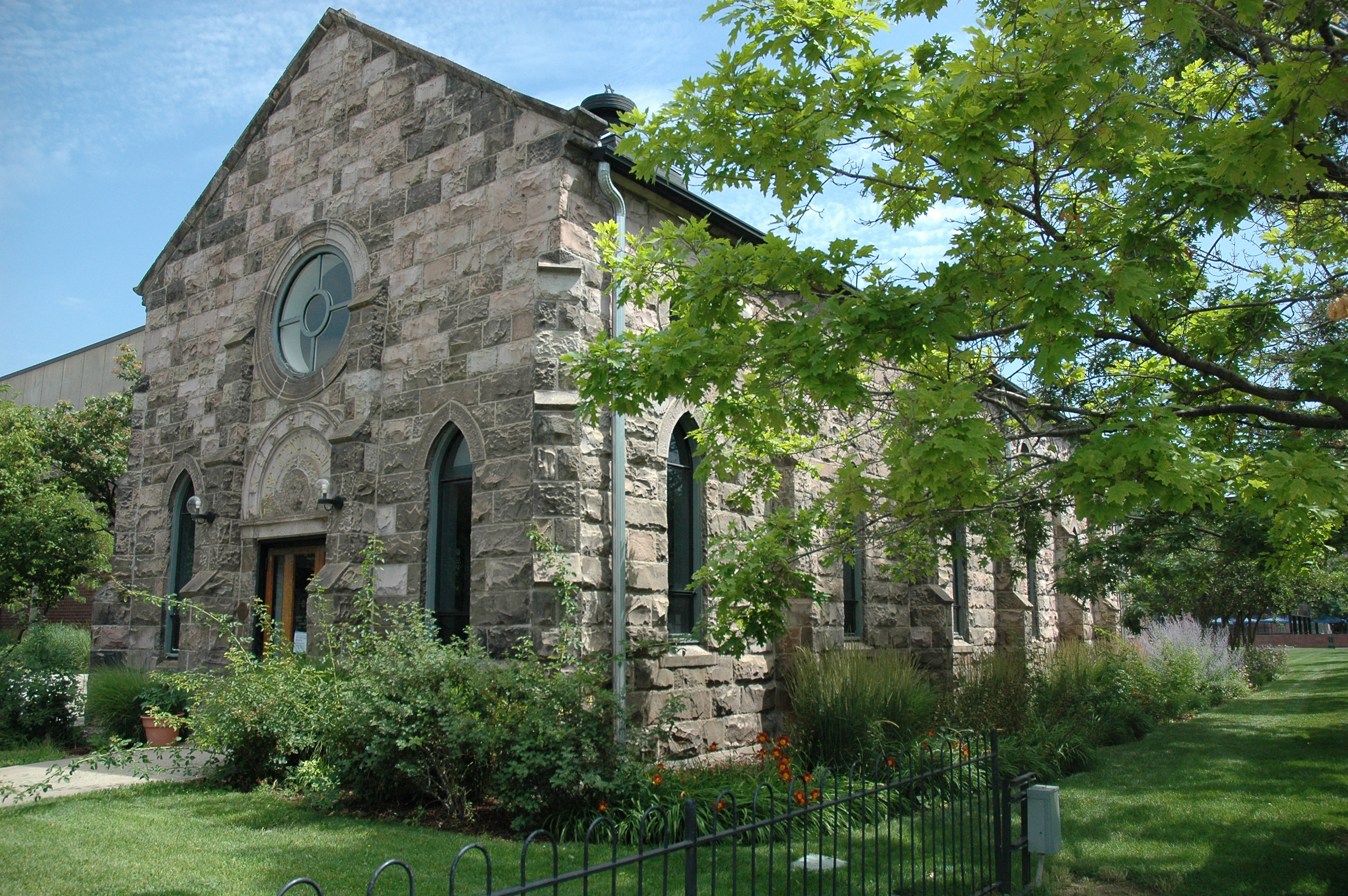
Built in 1876, the Emmanuel Gallery is Denver's oldest standing church structure. In 1973, Emmanuel became part of the Auraria Campus. Today it is an art gallery managed by the College of Arts & Media at CU Denver.

The College of Arts & Media (CAM) was the first college in Colorado devoted exclusively to Arts and Entertainment. The college is focused on the intersections of arts, technology, and commerce. With over 1,300 students in the college, it is one of the largest arts colleges in the Western U.S. CAM houses three departments: Music & Entertainment Industry Studies, Film & Television, and Visual Arts. The Music & Entertainment Industry Studies (MEIS) is one of the only contemporary focused music departments in the U.S. It is nationally known and ranked as one of the top contemporary music departments. MEIS attracts students from throughout the country and has over 500 enrolled students.The facilities used by the program include five recording studios, 16 practices rooms, a piano lab, a 200-seat King Center Recital Hall, and a 500-seat King Center Concert Hall. The Film & Television Program is the only BFA film and television program in Colorado. Over 250 students are enrolled in the department.

==== Graduate school ====
The Graduate School at CU Denver | Anschutz awards more graduate degrees than any other institution in Colorado. The school consists of nearly 60 graduate programs. The departments running these programs are housed in the schools and colleges on both campuses of the university. These offerings include both department-based and interdisciplinary programs. Graduate programs at CU Anschutz offer MS and PhD degrees focusing on basic, clinical and translational research in the biomedical sciences.

==== Business School ====
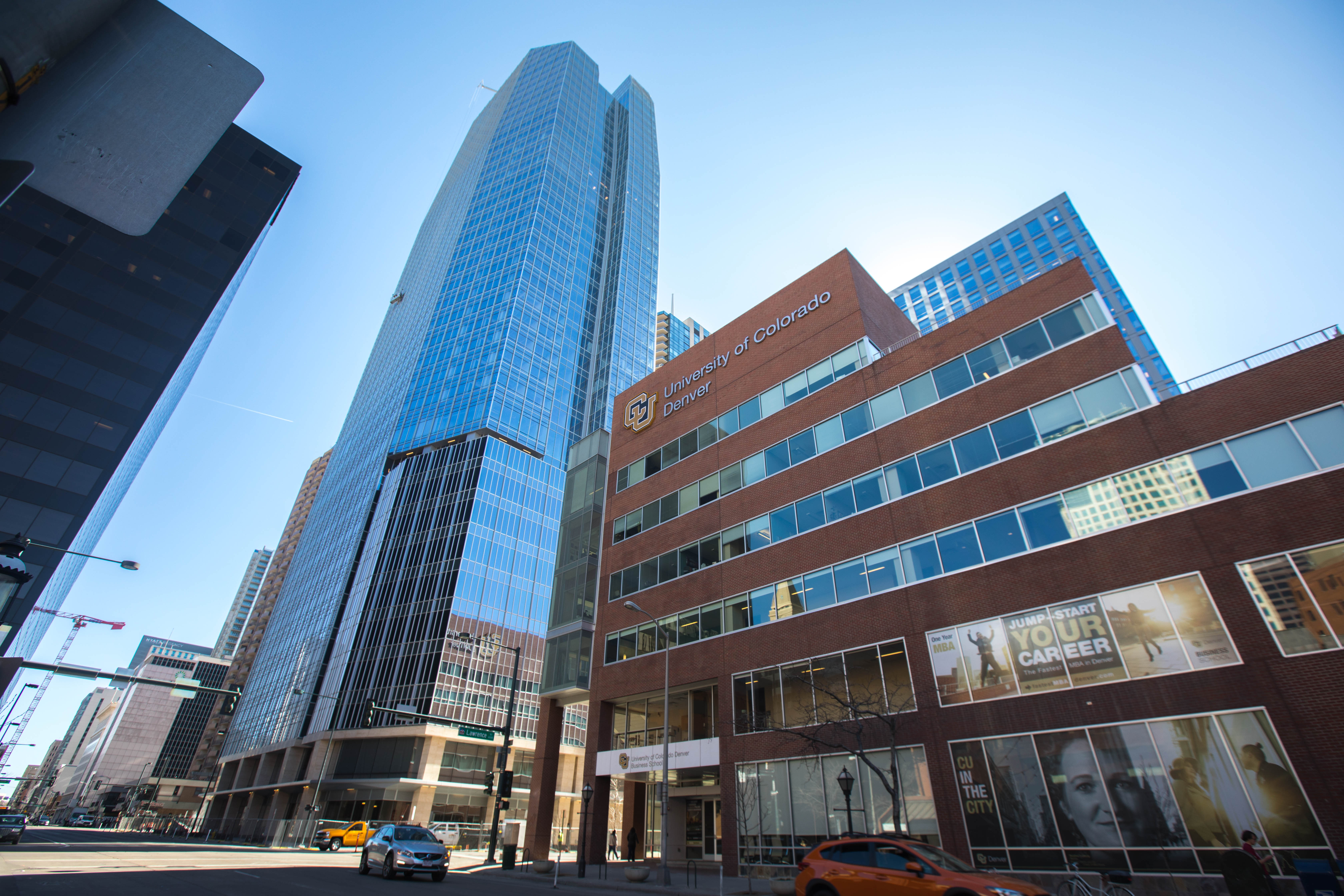
CU Denver Business School

The University of Colorado Denver Business School is accredited by AACSB International. The school is accredited at both the undergraduate and graduate levels. The Business School is one of only a few schools in the US to have a separate accreditation for its Accounting program. Business is one of the school's most popular majors since it is located in the heart of Downtown Denver. The Business School has worked with some of Colorado's top businesses such as Molson Coors, Wells Fargo, First Bank and Frontier Airlines, who provide feedback on the school's curriculum.

==== School of Public Affairs ====
The School of Public Affairs at CU Denver is accredited by the Network of Schools of Public Policy, Affairs, and Administration (NASPAA).

=== Rankings ===
Academic rankings

National
- Forbes: 450
- U.S. News & World Report: 227
- Washington Monthly: 97
- WSJ/College Pulse: 248

Global
- ARWU: 201–300
- QS: 851–900
- THE: 301–350
- U.S. News & World Report: 440

For 2021, U.S. News & World Report ranked the university 113th in Top Public Schools, 106th in Top Performers on Social Mobility, and 161st in Best Undergraduate Engineering Programs.

=== Relations with foreign universities ===
CU Denver maintains a joint education program with China Agricultural University in Beijing, operated at International College Beijing (ICB) on the CAU campus. Beijing students at ICB can attain a four-year degree in either economics or communications from CU Denver, with the opportunity to study abroad at the Denver campus.

== Student life ==
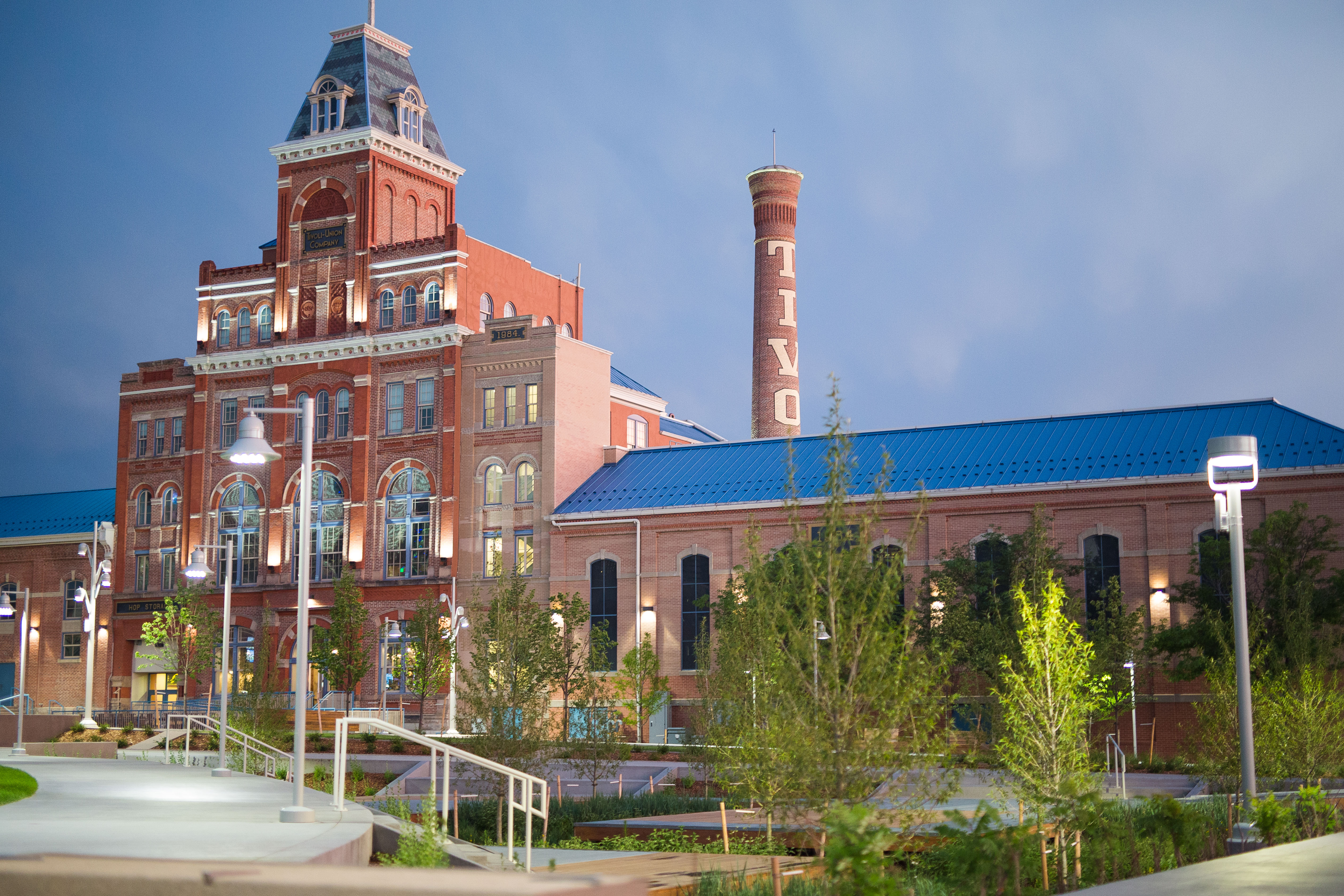
The Tivoli Student Union, named #9 of the 25 best student unions by Best College Reviews

University of Colorado Denver has over 100 student organizations, honor societies, professional organizations and faith-based groups, that offer social, service, and professional opportunities for their members within the university and community. First time freshmen and first time international students at the downtown campus are encouraged to live on campus in the Campus Village Residence Halls, a student housing complex at the Auraria Campus for students, faculty and staff from any of the three schools that share the campus. CU Denver provides a variety of sports and recreation activities to students, faculty and staff, including personal training, intramural basketball, volleyball, soccer, squash, and tennis, and sports equipment checkout for on or off campus use.

The CU Denver student newspaper is the CU Denver Sentry. The Distinguished Lecture Series hosts an array of speakers which has included David Horowitz and Malcolm-Jamal Warner. The Tivoli Student Union serves as a student center for the Community College of Denver, Metropolitan State University of Denver and University of Colorado Denver.

=== Club sports ===
While CU Denver does not sponsor officially sanctioned collegiate athletic programs, the school does offer several club athletic teams. These include men's and women's basketball, men's soccer, men's volleyball, cheer, cycling, powerlifting, swimming, and tennis. CU Denver's club teams compete against other programs in Colorado and the greater mountain west region.

== Notable people ==
=== Notable faculty ===
- Brenda J. Allen, former vice chancellor for Diversity & Inclusion, author of Difference Matters: Communicating Social Identity
- Jeffrey Beall, founder of Beall's List
- Tom Cech, of CU Boulder; Nobel laureate; affiliated faculty with CU Denver's Department of Biochemistry and Molecular Genetics
- Leo Franca, Department of Mathematical and Statistical Sciences; has developed stabilized finite elements, important in computational mechanics and engineering simulation
- William S. Friedman, rabbi
- Mary E. Guy, political scientist, public administration scholar
- Mark A. Heckler, founding dean of the CU Denver College of Arts and Media, president emeritus of Valparaiso University
- Lawrence Hunter, founder of the International Society for Computational Biology, the world's oldest and largest professional organization for bioinformatics and computational biology
- Bill Porter, audio engineer from the School of Music; created the first college program in audio engineering

=== Notable alumni ===
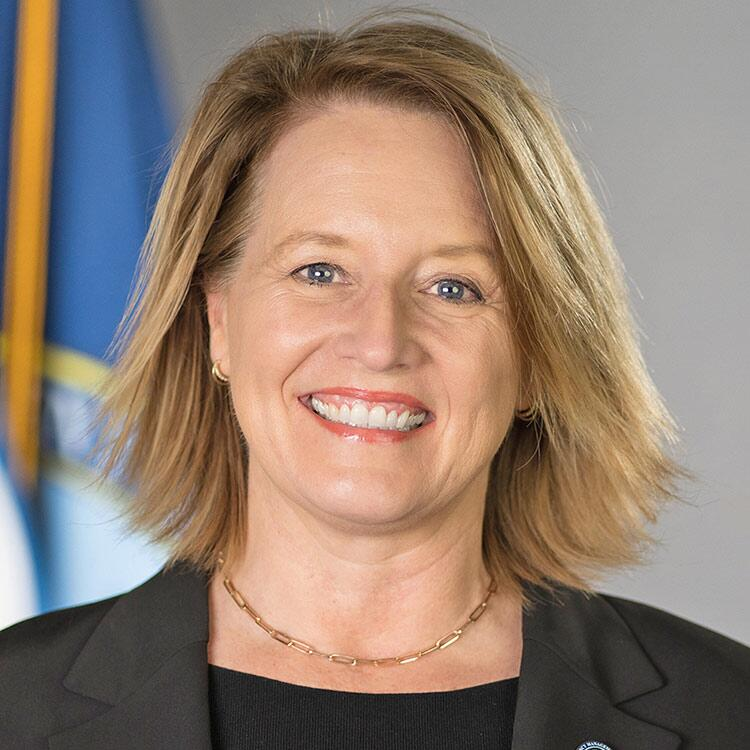
Deanne Criswell, administrator of the Federal Emergency Management Agency

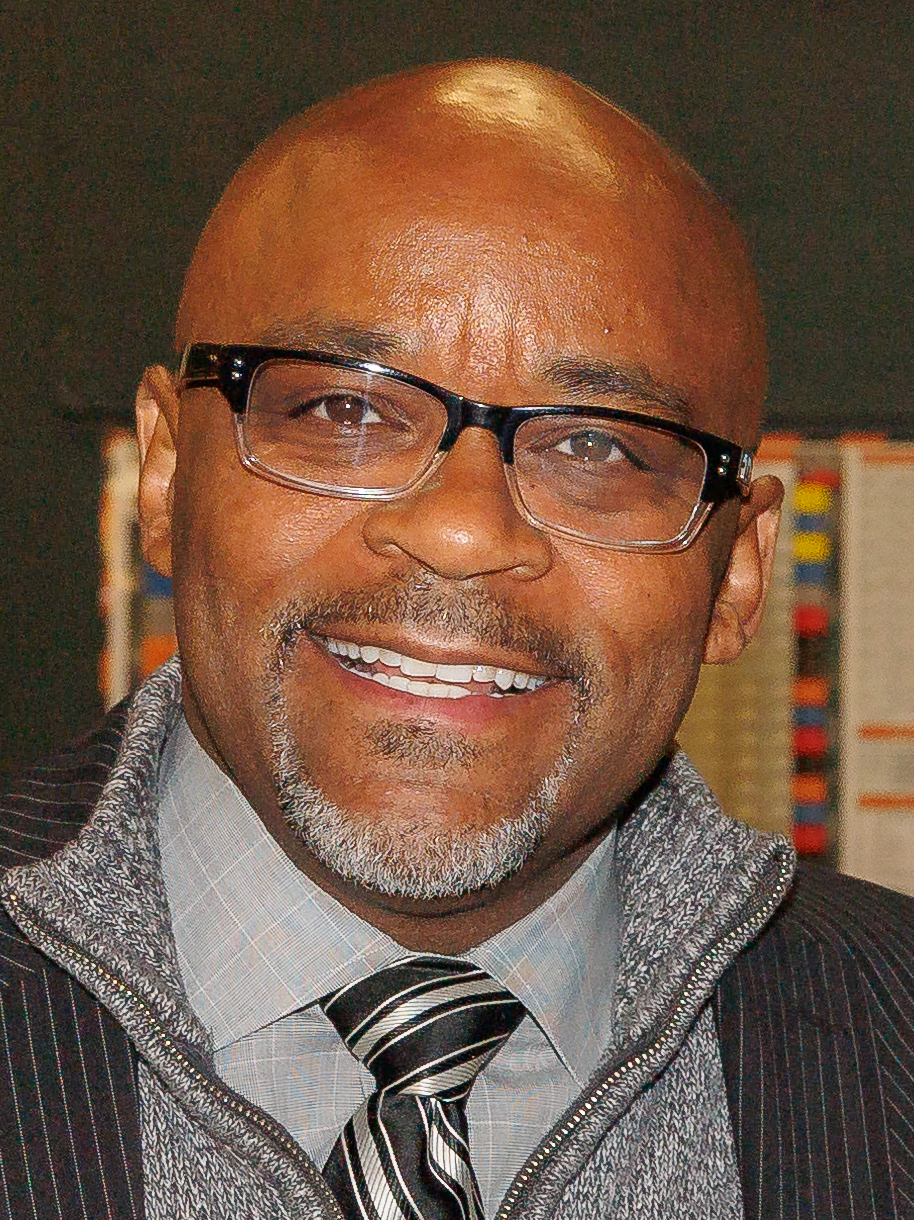
Michael Hancock, 45th mayor of Denver

- Rick Alden, class of 1996, owner and CEO of Skullcandy
- Insook Bhushan, Olympic table tennis player
- Janet Bonnema, civil engineer, first woman allowed to enter a tunnel project in Colorado
- Deanne Criswell, first female administrator of the Federal Emergency Management Agency
- Daniel Gilbert, class of 1981, author and professor of psychology at Harvard University
- Christi Grimm, Inspector General for the United States Department of Health and Human Services
- Michael B. Hancock, class of 1995, 45th mayor of Denver
- Illenium, class of 2013, EDM DJ
- Russell Keanini, class of 1987, mechanical engineer
- Aaron Kopp, class of 2009, filmmaker, director/producer of Liyana
- Jason Lewis, politician and radio host
- William Lindstedt, politician
- Frances McConnell-Mills, class of 1918, toxicologist
- Karen Middleton, class of 1996, former member of the Colorado House of Representatives and current executive director of Cobalt (formerly known as NARAL Pro-Choice Colorado)
- John Morse, class of 2001, former majority leader of the Colorado Senate
- Francisco F. Nogales, Spanish pathologist
- Julie Anne Peters, MBA 1989, author of young adult fiction
- Tenzing Rigdol, contemporary Tibetan artist and activist
- Carlos Samour, associate justice of the Colorado Supreme Court
- Isaac Slade, class of 2005, former lead singer and co-founder of Denver-based rock band The Fray
- Don Southerton, writer
- Gloria Tanner, class of 1976, first female African-American Colorado state senator
- Jun Xia, class of 1989, Chinese architect and lead designer of the Shanghai Tower
