= Southerton (surname) =

Southerton is a surname. Notable people with the surname include:

- Don Southerton, American business consultant and author
- James Southerton (1827–1880), English cricketer
- Simon Southerton, Australian plant geneticist and former Mormon

== See also ==
- Southerton, an industrial area in Harare, Zimbabwe
- Sotherton, a place in England
