= Boxee Box =

Linux-based set-top device by D-Link

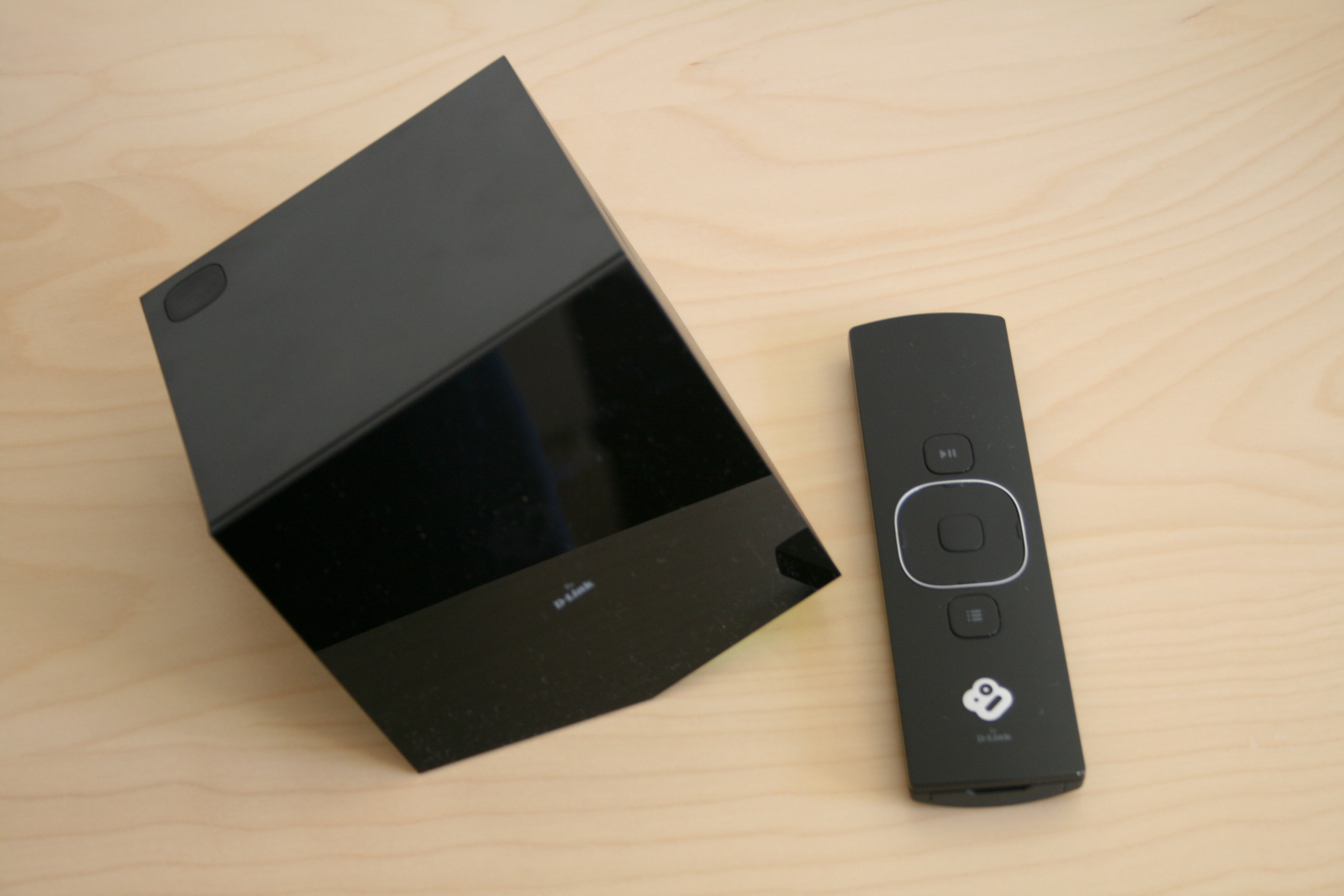
- Boxee Box and remote
- Developer: Boxee
- Manufacturer: D-Link
- Type: set top box
- Released: November 10, 2010
- Introductory price: US$ 199
- Discontinued: October 16, 2012
- Operating system: Linux
- CPU: Intel CE4100 SoC
- Memory: 1 GB RAM
- Storage: 1 GB NAND flash memory
- Display: 1080p
- Graphics: PowerVR SGX535
- Sound: Dolby Digital 5.1, DTS
- Controller input: D-Link Boxee Box Remote DSM-22
- Connectivity: Wi-Fi (802.11b/g/n) 2.4GHz only; 10/100 Ethernet; HDMI; S/PDIF; 2 × USB; RCA connector; SD card slot
- Online services: Boxee

Boxee Box by D-Link (officially "D-Link Boxee Box DSM-380") was a Linux-based set-top device and media extender that first began shipping in 33 countries worldwide on 10 November 2010. Designed to easily bring Internet television and other video to the television via Boxee's software, it came pre-installed with Boxee media center software. The hardware was based on the Intel CE4110 system-on-a-chip platform (that has a 1.2 GHz Intel Atom CPU with a PowerVR SGX535 integrated graphics processor), 1 GB of RAM, and 1 GB of NAND Flash Memory. The DM-380 featured an HDMI port (version 1.3), optical digital audio (S/PDIF) out, two RCA connectors for analog stereo audio, two USB ports, an SD card slot, wired 100BASE-TX Ethernet, and built-in 2.4 GHz 802.11n WiFi. The Live TV dongle, which started shipping in February 2012, enables users to watch digital OTA or Clear QAM cable television channels with EPG.

The Boxee Box also shipped with a small two-sided RF remote control with four-way D-pad navigation and a full QWERTY keypad as standard. This remote was also sold separately with a USB receiver as "D-Link Boxee Box Remote DSM-22" that could be used with Boxee installed on a computer (so that one could use this remote without owning D-Link's Boxee Box). The look of both the case and remote prototypes for the Boxee Box was designed by San Francisco–based Astro Studios, the designer of the Xbox 360 and Microsoft Zune.

On 16 October 2012, the Boxee team announced its intention to discontinue distribution.

== See also ==
- Boxee
- D-Link
- Comparison of digital media players
- FuboTV
