= Skullcandy =

American audio equipment company

Skullcandy Inc.
- Type: Subsidiary
- Industry: Audio
- Founded: 2003
- Founders: Rick Alden and Cris Williams
- Headquarters: Park City, Utah, U.S.
- Key people: Brian Garofalow (CEO)
- Products: Headphones; Audio equipment, audio accessories
- Revenue: ▲$266.3 million (2015)
- Owner: Bose Corporation
- Website: www.skullcandy.com

Skullcandy Inc. is an American company based in Park City, Utah, that markets technology such as headphones, earphones, Bluetooth speakers and other products.

The company was founded in 2003 and went public in 2011. It was acquired by Mill Road Capital for $196.9 million and the deal was finalized on October 3, 2016, making Skullcandy a wholly owned private subsidiary of that company. On October 21, 2026, Bose acquired Skullcandy.

== Products ==
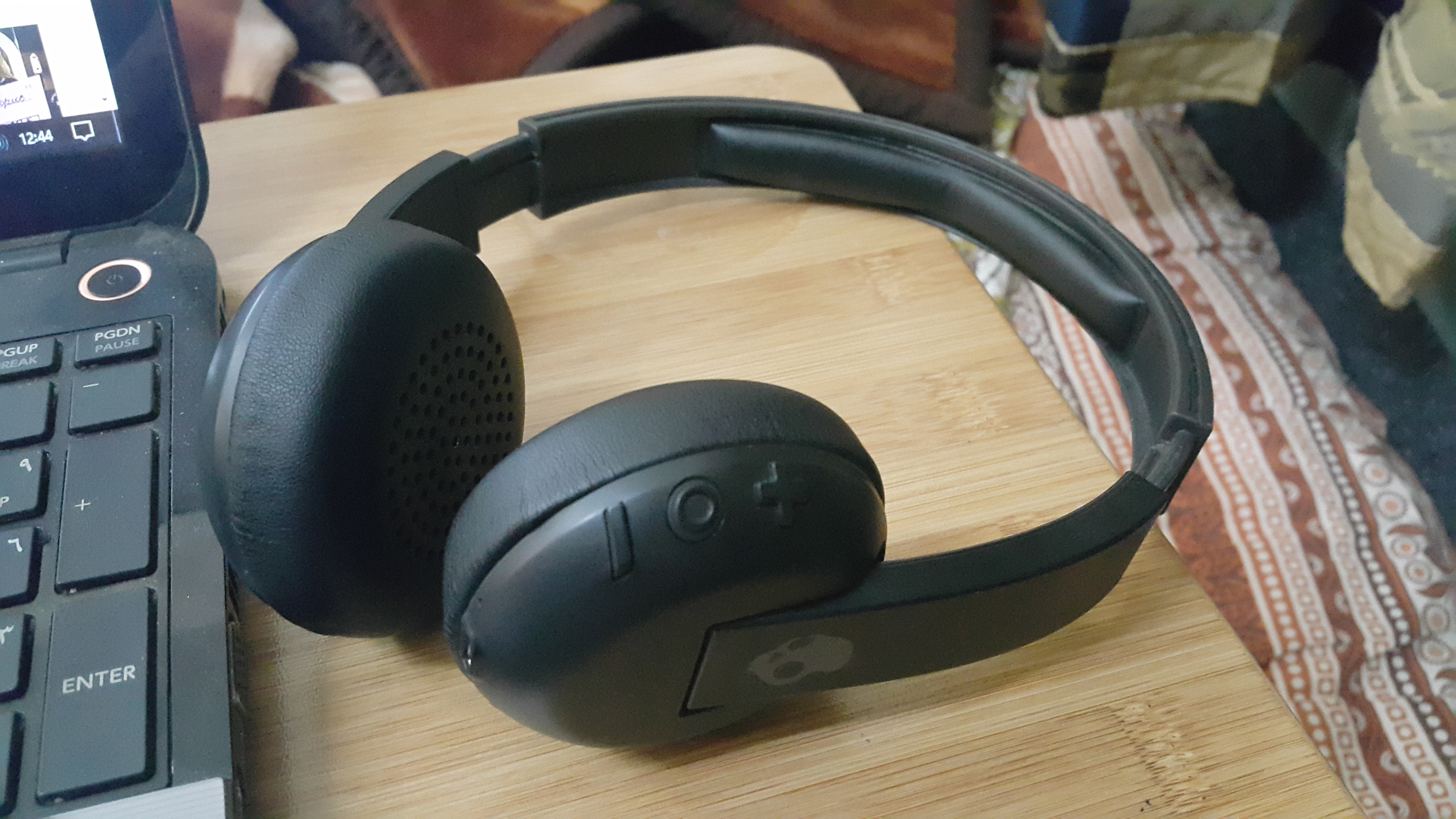
A black Bluetooth budget headset known as Uproar Wireless by Skullcandy

Skullcandy's products are primarily targeted at the outdoor action sports demographic (snowboarders, skateboarders, etc.) and the general consumer market, but they have expanded in recent years into the premium audio market with products such as the Crusher headphones.

Over recent years, Skullcandy has launched a range of partnerships and collaborations that span audio and lifestyle brands, and influential individuals including a roster of NBA players including Kevin Durant and James Harden, along with a SuperModel team. The company has established technology partnerships with leading audio companies such as Bose and THX to integrate advanced sound features into its products. Additionally, the brand has launched limited-edition collections and collaborations, including with Burton, and Doritos.

Skullcandy products are sold through retailers, specialty outlets, corporate incentive programs and the company's online store.

== Company history ==
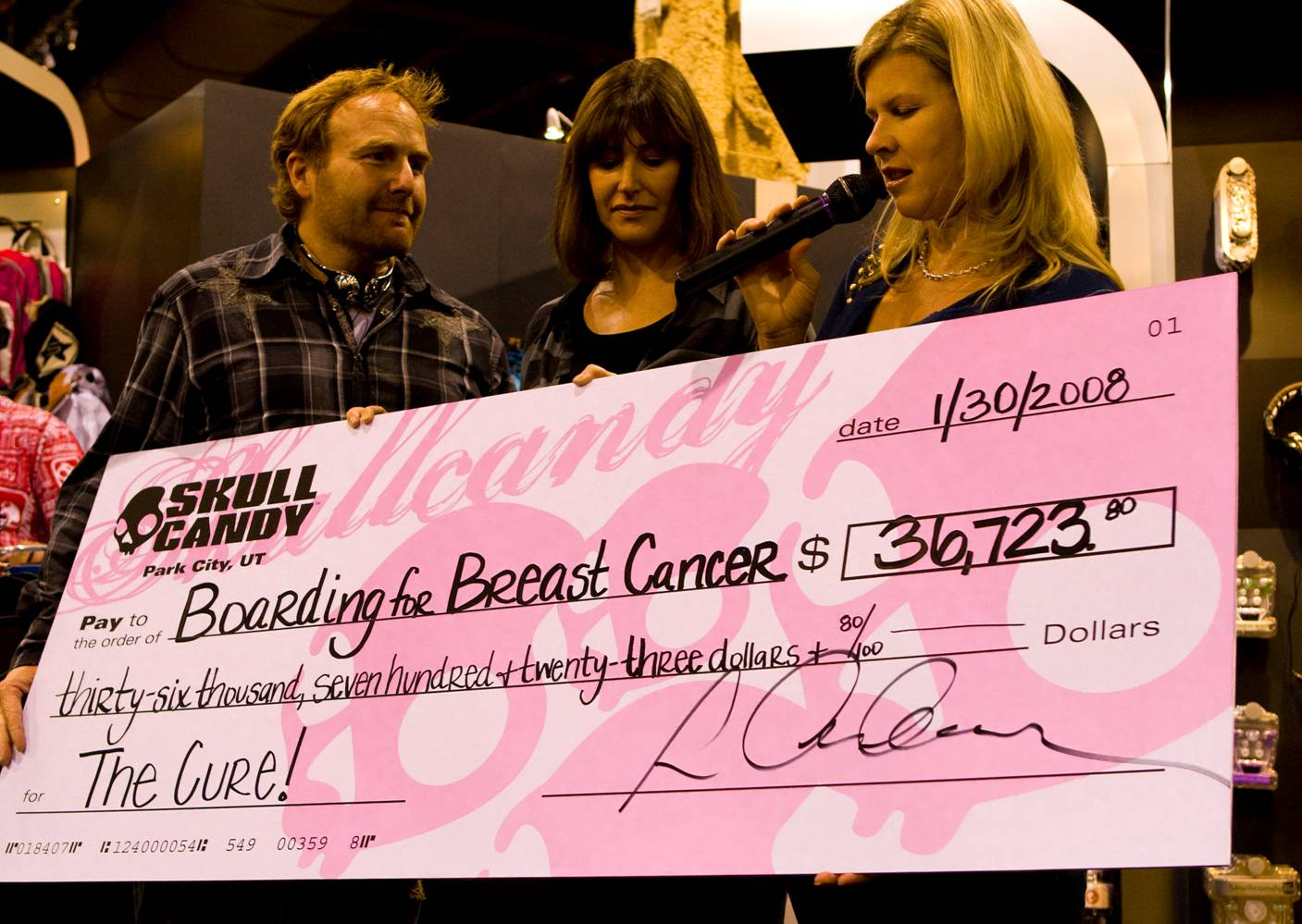
Rick Alden donating to Boarding for Breast Cancer charity in 2007

Skullcandy was founded by Rick Alden and Cris Williams in 2003. The first Skullcandy product, the Skullcandy Portable Link, was introduced at the 2003 International Consumer Electronics Show (CES) in Las Vegas, Nevada. The LINK system combines headphones with hands-free cellular technology, allowing users to listen to music from a portable audio device, while making and receiving calls through their cellphone. Skullcandy holds a patent for the wireless version of LINK technology.

In December 2008, Skullcandy products were described as "the world's coolest ear buds" by Fortune magazine.

In April 2011, Skullcandy purchased headphones manufacturer Astro Gaming from Astro Studios for an unknown amount of cash.

On January 28, 2011, Skullcandy filed for an initial public offering with the Securities and Exchange Commission. This announcement was met with some criticism from the financial press.

On June 24, 2016, Incipio, a maker of phone cases, wireless speakers, and other accessories, announced plans to acquire Skullcandy for $177 million; however, the deal later fell through as Incipio refused to submit a proposed amendment to the merger agreement and Skullcandy terminated the agreement. Skullcandy considered numerous other offers, eventually agreeing to be acquired by Mill Road Capital for $196.9 million at $6.35 per share. The deal was finalized and completed on October 3, 2016, and the company became a private business again.
