= Boxee =

Discontinued cross-platform media center application

Coordinates: 40.745062°N 73.992611°W

- Developers: Boxee, Inc.
- Release: 16 June 2008; 18 years ago
- Final release: 1.5 / 26 December 2011; 14 years ago
- Written in: C++ (and with Python scripts as plugins)
- Operating system: No longer supported: Linux; Mac OS X; Windows; iOS
- Platform: x86 and x86-64 architecture
- Available in: International (multiple languages)
- Type: Media center application / Digital media receiver
- License: GNU GPL and Closed Source (Proprietary Software)
- Website: web.archive.org/web/20110531145704/http://www.boxee.tv/

Boxee was a cross-platform freeware media center application with a 10-foot user interface and social networking features designed for the living-room TV. It enabled its users to view, rate and recommend content to their friends through many social network services and interactive media related features.

Boxee was originally a fork of the free and open source XBMC (now Kodi) media center application which Boxee used as an application framework for its GUI and media player core platform, together with some custom and proprietary additions.

Marketed as the first ever "Social Media Center", the first public alpha of Boxee was made available on 16 June 2008. The UI design of the Alpha prototype was designed with design firm Method Incorporated, who also created Boxee's brand identity. The first public beta version was officially released for all previously supported platforms on 7 January 2010. Boxee gained the ability to watch live TV on the Boxee Box using a live TV stick in January 2012. By the end of 2012 the developers had discontinued all desktop versions and support.

Boxee co-developed a dedicated set-top box (hardware) called "Boxee Box by D-Link" in cooperation with D-Link which was the first "Powered by Boxee" branded device to be announced and launched, as well as a similar media player device called "Iomega TV with Boxee" (available in the UK & Europe) in cooperation with Iomega and a 46" high-definition television from ViewSonic with integrated Boxee software.

Boxee was owned and developed by a single for-profit startup company, Boxee, Inc., which began as a high tech stealth startup based in Israel and the United States with seed money from several angel investors, and was then known to be financially backed by venture capital firms such as General Catalyst Partners, Union Square Ventures, Softbank, Pitango, Spark Capital and Globis Capital Partners. The company's main offices are located at 122 West 26th Street, 8th Floor, New York, NY 10001.

In July 2013 online media sources revealed Samsung would hire key employees and purchase Boxee's assets for around $30M. Samsung confirmed the acquisition with The New York Times, but did not disclose the amount.

== Overview ==
Boxee supported a wide range of popularly used multimedia formats, and it included features such as playlists, audio visualizations, slideshows, weather forecasts reporting, and an array of third-party plugins. As a media center application, Boxee could play most audio and video file containers, as well as display images from many sources, including CD/DVD-ROM drives, USB flash drives, the Internet, and local area network shares.

When run on modern PC hardware, Boxee was able to decode high-definition video up to 1080p. Boxee was able to use DXVA (DirectX Video Acceleration) on Windows Vista and newer Microsoft operating-systems to utilize GPU accelerated video decoding to assist with process of video decoding of high-definition videos.

With its Python-powered plugin system, the Boxee software incorporated features such as Apple movie trailer support and subtitle downloading, access to large on-demand video streaming services Netflix, Headweb and Vudu; a range of popular online internet content channels like audio services Pandora Radio, Last.fm, Jamendo, NPR, SHOUTcast radio streams; video services from ABC, BBC iPlayer, Blip.TV, CNET, CNN, CBS, Comedy Central, Funny or Die, Joost, Major League Baseball, NHL Hockey, MTV Music, MySpaceTV, Revision3, MUBI, OpenFilm, SnagFilms, IndieMoviesOnline, EZTakes, United Football League, Vevo, Vice Magazine, TED, The WB Television Network, YouTube and image services from Flickr and PicasaWeb picture viewing plugins. All were available as media sources available alongside the local library.

Some of the services were via specialized connections (e.g., YouTube), while the rest were a preselected list of podcast channels for streaming using generic RSS web feeds (e.g., BBC News). Boxee also supported NBC Universal's Hulu quite early on, but in February 2009 was asked by Hulu to remove the service at the request of Hulu's content partners. Boxee later reinstated the feature using Hulu's RSS feeds, but Hulu once again blocked access.

Even though both the Boxee App and the Boxee Box supported Netflix, the Boxee App supported only a limited instant queue, missing more recent TV shows and movies available through the web browser and iPhone apps.

In 2009, Boxee introduced a new plugin architecture based on the XUL (XULRunner) framework which technically allows any web-based application to be ported into an application for Boxee integration. Because of this Boxee could utilise Mozilla corebase architecture for most of its plugins – since this is the same core architecture used by Firefox, Hulu saw Boxee as "any other Mozilla browser so Hulu doesn't block the app." Hulu continued to thwart Boxee using strategies like JavaScript scrambling.

Boxee was able to play Adobe Flash content from sites such as YouTube and Hulu, and display HTML5 or Silverlight content from such web-based services such as HBO Go and Netflix. Boxee shipped with a closed source, binary-only, program called "bxflplayer", which was used to load Adobe Flash Player and Microsoft Silverlight proprietary plugins. This program communicated with the main Boxee process via shared memory and rendered the video onto screen. By using this approach, it was possible for Boxee not only to play Flash Video and Silverlight content that was protected by DRM (Digital Rights Management) but also allowed for the user to control the player using a remote control and other input devices that were more suitable to laid back watching. It was not clear if this way of using "bxflplayer" as closed source libraries with a GPL licensed software passes as GPL linking exception or not.

Boxee source code was otherwise in majority based on the XBMC (now Kodi) media center project's source code which Boxee used as its software framework, and the Boxee developers contributed changes to that part back upstream to the XBMC project. So Boxee was partially open-source, and those parts were distributed under the GNU General Public License, however Boxee's social networking layer library, "libboxee" was closed source as it dealt with proprietary methods of communication with Boxee's online back-end server which handled the user account information and social network communications between the users in the Boxee userbase. It is not clear if this way of using closed source libraries with a GPL licensed software passed the GPL linking exception or not.

== Features ==
=== Social Networking Layers ===
Boxee's social networking feature set it apart from other media center applications.

Boxee required users to create accounts, forming a social network of fellow Boxee users. Friends could follow each other’s activity, publicly rate content, and share recommendations. Users had control over their activity feed to maintain privacy. When recommending freely available content from an internet service, Boxee allowed others to stream it directly. For content that wasn’t freely available, Boxee displayed metadata and included movie trailers when possible.

A user's home screen displayed both their own recent activity and their friends' Boxee activity feeds. Internet content was accessible through sub-menus under each media category, such as Video → "My Videos" and Video → "Internet Videos."

Starting with Boxee Beta, users could enable an option to monitor their Twitter and Facebook news feeds for video links. Boxee would automatically detect these links and add the videos to a watch queue for later viewing.

Boxee could also export a user's media activity feed to other social networking services such as FriendFeed, Twitter, and Tumblr. Through FriendFeed, Twitter, and Tumblr it was possible from those third-party social networking services for a user to choose to post the Boxee activity feed to social networking sites such as Facebook, (through FriendFeed, Twitter, and Tumblr apps for Facebook).

=== Boxee AppBox Add-on Store and plugin Apps (widgets/gadgets) ===
Boxee's "AppBox" app store "App Store" which was a digital distribution service platform that served add-on apps and plug-ins that provide online content to Boxee, the "AppBox" allowed users to download new apps and addons directly from Boxee's GUI. Many of these sources were in high definition and use streaming sites' native flash and Silverlight players. Boxee had extensibility and integration with online sources for free and premium streaming content.

AppBox provided a variety of content, including commercial videos, educational programming, and media from independent creators and small businesses.

Boxee encouraged users to create and submit their own add-on apps and plugins, expanding the available content within the platform.

=== Audio/video playback and handling ===
Boxee could play multimedia files from CD/DVD media using the system's DVD-ROM drive, local hard disk drive, or stream them over SMB/SAMBA/CIFS shares, or UPnP (Universal Plug and Play) shares.

Boxee was designed to take advantage of the system's network port if a broadband Internet connection was available, enabling the user to get information from such sites as IMDb, TV.com and AMG.

Boxee supported streaming internet video and playing internet radio stations, including SHOUTcast. Boxee also included the option to submit music usage statistics to Last.fm and a weather-forecast (via weather.com). It also had music/video-playlist features, picture/image-slideshow functions, an MP3+CDG karaoke function (not available on the Boxee Box) and many audio-visualizations and screensavers.

Boxee could in addition upscale/upconvert all 480p/576p standard-resolution videos and output them to 720p, 1080i, or 1080p HDTV-resolutions.

Boxee could be used to play most common multimedia containers and formats from a local source, (except those protected by those with DRM encryption). It could decode these in software, or optionally pass-through AC3/DTS audio from movies directly to S/PDIF output to an external audio amplifier or receiver for decoding on that device.

=== Video playback in detail ===
The Video Library, one of the Boxee metadata databases, was a key feature of Boxee. It automatically organized a user's video content based on metadata associated with movie and recorded TV show files.

The Library Mode view in Boxee allowed a user to browse video content by categories such as Genre, Title, Year, Actors and Director.

Boxee had the capability to on the fly parse and play DVD-Video movies that are stored in ISO and IMG DVD-images, DVD-Video movies that are stored as DVD-Video (IFO/VOB/BUP) files on a hard-drive or network-share, and also ISO and IMG DVD-images directly from RAR and ZIP archives. It also offered software upscaling/upconverting of all DVD-Video movies when outputting them to an HDTV in 720p, 1080i or 1080p.

=== Audio playback in detail ===
The Music Library was another key feature of Boxee. It automatically organized the user's music collection by information stored in the music files ID meta tags, such as title, artist, album, genre and popularity.

Boxee featured on-the-fly audio frequency resampling, gapless playback, crossfading, ReplayGain, cue sheet and Ogg Chapter support.

=== Digital picture/image display in detail ===
Boxee handled all common digital picture/image formats with the options of panning/zooming and slideshow with "Ken Burns effect", with the use of CxImage open source library code.

=== BitTorrent client, interface, and torrent trackers ===
Early versions of Boxee featured a built-in BitTorrent client (excluding the Windows version) with an integrated frontend in the Boxee interface. By default, it also included torrent links to legal BitTorrent trackers sites. The built-in torrent client was later removed. However, Boxee's Python plugin system allowed users to create their own plugins or install third-party plugins for other BitTorrent trackers.

== Mobile software associated with Boxee ==
The "boxee remote") was an application released by Boxee Inc. for the Apple Inc. iOS which allowed for remote controlling of an installed and concurrently-active Boxee session on another computer via the iOS' touchscreen user interface. It was approved for the App Store on 16 March 2010.

Third-party developers also released Boxee remote control apps for Android and webOS.

This is a list of third-party companies who sold hardware bundled with Boxee media center application pre-install, or sold uninstalled systems that specifically claimed to be Boxee-compatible ("Boxee Enabled") by the manufacturer. These third-party companies directly or indirectly helped submit bug fixes back upstream to Boxee, as well as to the XBMC project which Boxee in turn used as its framework.

=== Boxee Box by D-Link ===
Boxee Box by D-Link (officially "D-Link Boxee Box DSM-380") was a Linux-based set-top device and media extender that first began shipping in 33 countries worldwide on 10 November 2010. Designed to act as a hub, to bring internet television and other video to the television via Boxee's software, it came pre-installed with the Boxee media center application and the hardware was based on Intel CE4110 system-on-a-chip platform (that has a 1.2 GHz Intel Atom CPU with a PowerVR SGX535 Integrated graphics processor), 1 GB of RAM, and 1 GB of NAND Flash Memory. The DSM-380 featured output ports for HDMI (version 1.3), optical digital audio (S/PDIF) connector, and RCA connector for analog stereo audio, two USB ports, an SD card slot, wired 100 Mbit/s (100BASE-T) Ethernet, and built-in 802.11n WiFi.

The Boxee Box also shipped with a small two-sided RF remote control with 4-way D-pad navigation and a full QWERTY keypad as standard, and this remote was also sold separately with a USB-receiver as "D-Link Boxee Box Remote DSM-22" which could be used with Boxee installed on a computer so one can use this remote without owning D-Link's Boxee Box The look of both the case and remote prototypes for the Boxee Box were designed by San Francisco-based Astro Studios, the same designer company that designed the look of Xbox 360 and the Microsoft Zune.

=== Iomega TV with Boxee by Iomega ===
On January 4, 2011, Boxee announced the Iomega TV with Boxee, making it the second Boxee device to be introduced. It began shipping in the first quarter of 2011.

The Iomega TV with Boxee was a Linux device which came pre-installed with the Boxee media center application. The hardware was based on Intel CE4110 system-on-a-chip platform (that has a 1.2 GHz Intel Atom CPU with a PowerVR SGX535 Integrated graphics processor), 1 GB of RAM, and 1 GB of NAND Flash Memory. Iomega TV with Boxee features audio / video output ports for HDMI (version 1.3), optical and coaxial digital audio (S/PDIF) connectors, and RCA connector for analog stereo audio, two USB ports, wired 1 Gbit/s Ethernet, and built-in 802.11n WiFi.

The Iomega TV with Boxee came with a compact, dual-sided RF remote featuring a 4-way D-pad for navigation and a full QWERTY keyboard as standard.

However, unlike D-Link's Boxee Box, the Iomega TV with Boxee device featured space to internally fit a 3.5-inch SATA hard drive. According to Boxee, the hard drive was not only for the Boxee software on the device but also usable as a NAS (Network Attached Storage) unit to share its media data over the network as a DLNA compliant UPnP AV media server.

=== Myka ION ===
Myka ION was an Nvidia Ion based set-top device designed to bring internet television and media stored on the home network to the living-room, it came pre-installed with Boxee, XBMC, and Hulu Desktop as applications that could be started from the main menu.

=== NUU Player ===
The NUU Player, developed by NUU Media (NUU Ltd.), was an Nvidia Ion-based set-top device designed to bring internet television and home network media to the living room. It came pre-installed with Boxee, Hulu Desktop, and a WebKit web browser, all accessible from the main menu via remote control. The device also featured a Skype app and Bluetooth support. NUU has since discontinued the NUU Player and removed all references to it from their website.

== Reception ==
In October 2008, Boxee won Consumer Electronics Association's (CEA) i-Stage award, and with it $50,000 prize for the continued development of Boxee, as well as a free booth for the 2009 International CES (Consumer Electronics Show). Boxee donated half of the $50,000 prize money to the developers of XBMC.

On January 9, 2009, G4 named Boxee the winner of its "Best of the Best Products of CES 2009" award in the "Maximum Tech" category, recognizing it as the top product showcased at the Consumer Electronics Show (CES) that year.

In January 2010, at the Consumer Electronics Show, Boxee garnered 5 awards; "LAPTOP's Best of CES 2010 – Best Home Entertainment (Boxee Box)", "Last Gadget Standing – CES 2010 Winner", "International CES Best of Innovations 210 – Home Theater Accessories", "Popular Science – Best of CES 2010 (Products of the Future)".

In April 2011, it was revealed that Boxee had violated the terms of the GPL in its use of open-source software. Under GPLv3, which applied to the device's firmware, users were required to have the ability to reinstall modified software. While Boxee acknowledged that the software was included in each device, the company cited financial agreements with other partners as a barrier to compliance. Despite user frustration, Boxee did not change its stance.

On October 31, 2012, Boxee published a statement on their website explaining that they had to choose between releasing a hackable device or one that was commercially viable with premium content.

Boxee stated that while they wanted the Boxee Box to support other software, their agreements with content providers required them to prioritize content security. This response sparked a wave of negative comments from users on the Boxee blog, as it contradicted earlier promises. Within a day, Boxee removed the entire page—including the statement, blog, and comments—and replaced it with a new Boxee TV website. However, the original Boxee blog was not deleted but relocated.

== See also ==
- Comparison of media players
- Interactive television
- List of free television software
- Smart TV
- Web television
