= Rick Alden =

American entrepreneur

Richard P. Alden
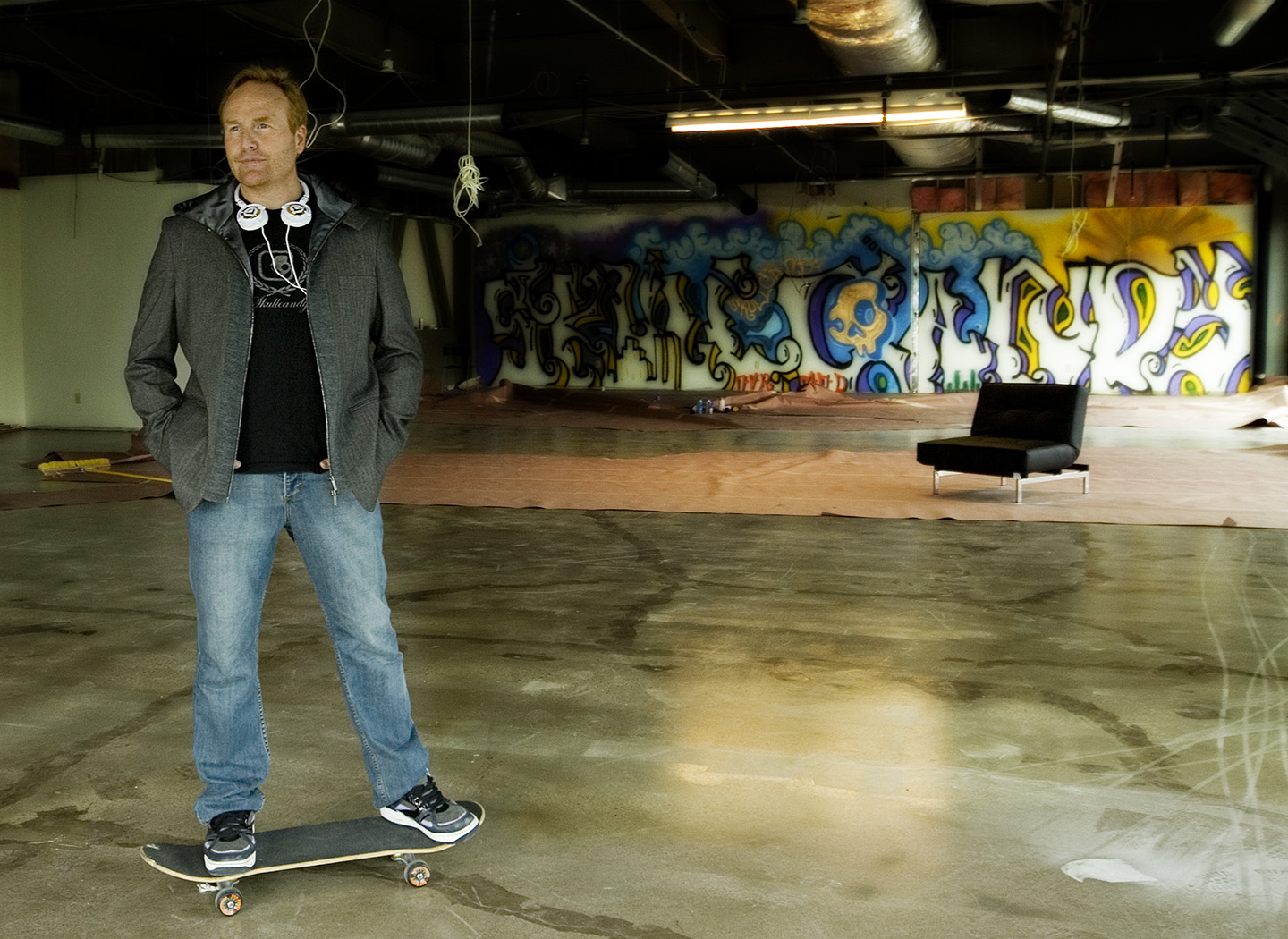
- Born: July 4, 1964 (age 62)
- Education: University of Colorado Boulder (B.A.)

Richard P. Alden (born July 4, 1964) is an American entrepreneur and the founder and former CEO of Skullcandy, Inc., Device Step-In Snowboard Bindings, Stance Socks, and co-founder of Plus550 LLC.

== Education and career ==
While studying at the University of Colorado Boulder, Alden co-founded his first company with Jim Gardner in 1986 — National Snowboard – an events and marketing company producing consumer, amateur, and pro-snowboarding events nationwide. When the company moved to Denver, Alden transferred to the University of Colorado Denver, where he received his Bachelor of Arts in political science. Alden launched his second venture in 1995, designing and patenting the first step-in snowboard boot and binding system. This venture was co-founded with snowboard industry veteran Brett Conrad, and launched under the brand name, Device Manufacturing.

=== Skullcandy ===
In 2003, Alden formed Skullcandy designing headphones and other audio products targeted as skiers, skateboarders and other outdoor activities. The first Skullcandy product – the Skullcandy Portable LINK – was introduced at the 2003 Consumer Electronic Show in Las Vegas, where it won its first Design and Innovation Award. A few weeks later, the brand was launched to the action sports industry at the SnowSports Industries America Snow Show.

In 2008, Skullcandy debuted 2XL to the marketplace at all retail stores. From on ear headphones (Shakedown, Phase, Barrel), earbuds (Spoke, Whip, Offset), and even Bluetooth speakers (Ringer), 2XL products come in a wide variety of colors, which is similar to all Skullcandy products like the Uprock, Ink'd 2, and even Jib.

While CEO of Skullcandy, Alden was issued a patent for technology that integrates mobile phones and music players, known as LINK.

Alden holds a design patent for the Orvis Batternkill Large Arbor Fly Fishing Reel.

== Awards and recognition ==
In 2008, Alden was featured as #31 in (#1 in Consumer Electronics Category) Inc Magazine's Inc 5000 Award for Skullcandy's three-year (2004–2007) growth. In December 2009, Rick was named "Entrepreneur's Entrepreneur of the Year" and appeared on the cover of the January 2010 issue.

== Personal life ==
Alden resides in Denver,
