= Karen Ashcraft =

American academic

Karen Ashcraft is an American communication scholar and professor at the University of Colorado at Boulder. Her area of research is in social justice and organizational studies. She looks at identity in the workplace and organizational structures. Specifically she studies issues of diversity, hybrid organizations, gender and power. Being an organizational communication scholar, she sees discourse as central to understanding our human condition as well as how communication amounts to organizing. She examines discourse through a lens of a feminist communicology model to look at the critical role that communication has in one's identity creation.

== Academia ==
She completed her dissertation and received her PhD in 1998 at the University of Colorado at Boulder. She was an associate professor and taught at the University of Utah. She returned to the University of Colorado at Boulder to teach in 2009 and where she remains today as a professor. She is a feminist communication scholar who studies objects in a wider political, cultural, and economic context. Her research has primarily covered gender, power, professional identity, and alternative organizational forms. With a major focus on her work on feminism in organization communication she is able to delve into areas of underrepresented gender groups.

== Research ==
The majority of Ashcraft's work takes place within professional organizations. A frequent area in which she researches are the effects communication differences is gender identity. Her work explores communication through a critical and feminist lens. When looking in the setting of a professional organization the structure of it is significant to the way it runs and its outcomes. While Ashcraft explores issues of diversity, identity, gender, power, and discourse; the organizational setting that she observes plays a pivotal role in her findings.

=== Gendered organizations ===
The bureaucracy structure has been utilized over years and at times been seen to be reasonable and helpful, but alternative structures that call on different aspects can also be helpful. Since bureaucracy has historically been known to be an expression that favors a male ideology, feminist have been known to advocate collectivism. Traditionally bureaucracies have been hierarchical in authority, having impersonal relations, and biased notions of objectivity and rationality. Through feminist organizations egalitarian tendencies are more sought out and collectivism displays a way to pursue empowerment by seeking to be harmonious in both private and public spheres. Feminist Organizations are a resource that no one had truly delved into in the past. Ashcraft displays how if included within management then research can create random alliances and uncover alternative viewpoints that may counter current ideologies. She sees feminist organizational communication theory as an extension of the larger feminist movement that can be seen independent of critical theory.

Ashcraft examines how discursive messages constitute organizational setting's gendered identity, instead of reflecting it. In this way, she discusses how discourse produces, solidifies, interrupts, and modifies gender identity. In one way, institutional discourse sides more with the individual rather than systematic tendencies. It separates women and men, it normalizes dominant groups’ discourse, and it warrants rationale for organizational control and exclusion with difference. In a different light, looking at discourse as a performance highlights the way in which Ashcraft sees discourse constituting gender. If we were to value difference then it would involve celebrating asymmetrical power relations (Ashcraft and Pakanowsky, 1996). She advocates that the process of interaction will elicit the audience to see a new perspective. A fresh set of lenses can definitely help insiders and outsiders understand that larger context and may pair then with better understanding.

Ashcraft, along with Dennis Mumby, present four frames that can be used within the communication field to analyze discourse, power, identity, and gendered organizing relationships.

1. Ashcraft's first frame views gender as socially constructed but as deeply rooted in biological sex and remains relatively unchanged over time. In organizational settings, power becomes relevant in how gender differences are distinguished and belittled. Frame 1 is centered on the ways in which gender identity shapes how individuals interact with each other. In this sense communication is treated as evidence or a product of gender identity.
2. Frame 2 is Discourse (Dis)Organizes Gender, and it speaks to identity as something that is “done.” In her second frame, Ashcraft proposes that discourse and gender identity have a dialectical and interactional relationship. Our everyday performances, or micro-practices play a large role in our interactions with others.
3. The third way that Ashcraft frames her discussion is through gendered organizations. which speak to organizations being gendered in order to demonstrate and replicate patriarchy or the systemic privileging of masculinity.
4. The final frame that Ashcraft uses is gendered narratives in popular culture, where the focus is on communication that is “about” organizations. This would also include how a larger society, such as media, illustrates and negotiates its establishments and the very notion of work. These four frames situate forms differently they can also be positioned in terms of affinity and overlap.

==== Hybrid organizations ====
The feminist lens that Ashcraft uses enhances understanding of organizational hybrids. A hybrid organization are often less ideologically pure but more receptive to practical troubles, may better assist in institutional improvements, emancipatory revisions, or resistant behaviors. A paradoxical hybrid looks at how organizational members dealt with contradicting forms in quotidian practices. Ashcraft looks at how through hybrid forms of organizing, organizations want to find and create different options than simply the bureaucratic structure. She discusses how some organizations move from a form of bureaucracy and hierarchy, to one being feminist and egalitarian and how these two philosophies can cause tensions that may be hard to mediate.

The hybrid that erodes from her research she terms “organized dissonance.” The idea of this is that it interrupts the hegemonic generalizations about rationality, forms of organization, and power. Organized dissonance is a distinctive paradoxical form of hybrid that gets enlightened by feminist bureaucracy. This term describes an efficiently united set of forms that are thought to be confrontational. In Ashcraft's words, it is a “ strategic union of forms presumed hostile”.

Organized dissonance is a class of hybrid organization; its strategic incongruity is its guiding presumption. Organizations meet commands and objectives that conflict by employing incompatible forms. This ultimately allows members to interact with contradicting dialect that is quite deliberate. Organized dissonance brings about tensions that are among areas of: equality/inequality, centralization/decentralization, stability/flexibility, and individual/community. By disrupting the ideal harmonious hybrid organized dissonance meets goals that are contradictory. Ashcraft argues that the idea of cautiously pairing members with the “enemy” may be a better way to permit social change. Ashcraft argues that seeing these tensions that come out of hybrid forms of organizing is of great importance to examine.

=== Diversity ===
Ashcraft discusses speaking of organizational systems and behaviors as gendered but it is also important to be thinking about race. Too often do we focus meticulously on gendered ways of organizing and we consistently ignore how we are essentially raced. When looking at diversity there are many misunderstandings and aspects that are left out that tie into the way we see diversity in the workplace. Ashcraft, along with Brenda J. Allen, highlight five consequences of the ways that we are inclined to express and silence race while preserving the normative power of organized Whiteness.

The first message is that “race tends to be depicted as separate, singular that is relevant only under certain circumstances”. It is simultaneously being concealed as something that has previously been written in institutions. When we discuss race, it often seems to demonstrate an identity that is fixed with comparatively predictable outcomes on one's outlook or actions. Issues of race are also usually constrained to practice and “professional” settings. She suggests that displaying race as a central element in an organization can help by incorporating issues of race within foundational texts.

The second message is that “race is relevant in so far as it involves cultural differences, which can be identified, valued, and managed to improve organizational performance” (Ashcraft & Allen, 2003). Here stands a desperate need for appreciation and understanding to cultural diversity, which if strategically applied can allow organizational productivity and innovation to flourish. She discusses that theorizing race could help by exposing and engaging it as a serious matter within the organization. This will allow members to better grasp how race gets organizations become raced and how race gets organized.

The third message is that “all cultural differences are synonymous with international variations” (Ashcraft & Allen, 2003). As globalization rapidly spreads, organizations are expected to employ and understand differences among cultures. Another aspect is that all of the cultural differences correspond to those that are between nations. Ashcraft discusses that we can point to and expand on ranges of racial categories and heterogeneity that is encompassed within each in order to steer away from racial bifurcations. We can then propose essential possibilities to “cultural difference” race models.

The fourth message is that “racial discrimination is a function of personal bias, interpersonal misunderstanding, organizational failure to manage cultural differences, and disproportionate demographics” (Ashcraft & Allen, 2003). Discrimination comes from numerous sources including misunderstandings and management styles. It is described as being an unfortunate behavior of members inside an organization and not as a distinctive organizational creation. It is important to study experiences that comparative to workers of multiple racial groups within diverse organizational environments.

The fifth message is “white (collar) workplaces and work/ers constitute “universal” settings, identities, and practices” 2003. This is to say that organizations can colonize their members in various ways, but by placing assumptions on a “universal” worker may place some members in a more favorable and appropriate place than others. For example, when we craft our “professional” self then we must also enact “Whiteness,” because of the dilution of cultural identities and having “whiteness” as a homogeneous and invisible standard. Here Ashcraft suggests to examine the idea that we are all raced beings, including that of Whiteness.

If we look into our industry's racial roots we will be able to have a richer understanding on how organizing is raced very deeply. When looking at race an important aspect that Ashcraft delves into is being sensitive to absence and presence. Here she looks at both why and how race draws our obvious attention and indefinite silence to certain things. Ashcraft displays how institutional powers use both race and gender to delineate members as having less credibility or in sexualized ways. In this way, culture's of organizations have an interplay with raced organizations in that it supports or contradicts social constructions of race and gender that happen at the societal level.

It is significant for Ashcraft to study and initiate discourse over troubling questions because they are much overdue. After sparking awareness, eventually she has a vision to rebuild the racial foundation of organizational communication.

== Publications ==
Ashcraft has appeared in the following forums: Communication Monographics, Administrative Science Quarterly, and Academy of Management Journal. She has co-authored a book with Dennis Mumby in 2004 named Reworking Gender: A Feminist Communicology of Organization. She has written several chapters in numerous books as well as being published in multiple communication research journals.

== Awards ==
Ashcraft has been the recipient of many academic honors and awards. Following are just some of her honors: Article of the Year Award for NCA in the Organizational Communication Division, in 2006, Book of the Year Award for NCA in the Organizational Communication Division in 2004, and she was named the Virgil C. Aldrich Fellow by the Tanner Humanities Center at the University of Utah for Spring 2003.

== Sources ==
- Ashcraft, K. L. (2000). Empowering "professional" relationships: Organizational communication meets feminist practice. Management Communication Quarterly, 13, 347–392.
- Ashcraft, K. L. (2005). Feminist organizational communication studies: Engaging gender in public and private. In S. May & D. K. Mumby (Eds.), Engaging Organizational Communication Theory & Research: Multiple Perspectives (pp. 141–170). Thousand Oaks, CA: Sage.
- Ashcraft, K. L. & Flores, L. A. (2003). “Slaves with white collars": Persistent performances of masculinity in crisis. Text and Performance Quarterly, 23 (1), 1–29.
- Ashcraft, K. L., & Kedrowicz, A. (2002). Self-direction or social support?: Nonprofit empowerment and the tacit employment contract of organizational communication studies. Communication Monographs, 69, 88–110.
- Ashcraft, K. L., & Pacanowsky, M. E. (1996). “A woman’s worst enemy”: Reflections on a narrative of organizational life and female identity. Journal of Applied Communication Research, 24, 1–23.
