= Astro Gaming =

American consumer electronics maker

ASTRO Gaming
- Type: Subsidiary
- Founded: 2006
- Founders: Jordan Reiss, Brett Lovelady
- Headquarters: San Francisco, California, U.S. (corporate headquarters)
- Area served: Worldwide
- Products: Gaming peripherals
- Parent: Skullcandy (2011–2016); Mill Road Capital (2016–2017); Logitech (2017–present)
- Website: astrogaming.com

ASTRO Gaming is an American consumer electronics manufacturer specializing in video gaming headsets, peripherals, and accessories.

== Overview ==
ASTRO Gaming's predecessor, Astro Studios, partnered with Microsoft on the industrial design for the Xbox 360 gaming console and controller. ASTRO Gaming was then founded in 2006 by Brett Lovelady and Jordan Reiss in San Francisco, California, where the company's headquarters remains today. After several years of operating independently, ASTRO Gaming was acquired by the headphone manufacturer Skullcandy in 2011. ASTRO Gaming operated under Skullcandy for six years before it was acquired by Logitech in 2017 for $85 million.

== History ==
After Astro Studios helped design the Xbox 360, Lovelady and Reiss founded a separate company, ASTRO Gaming, in 2006. In August 2006, Astro Gaming raised its first round of funding of $2 million with the help of Seraphim investment. ASTRO Gaming started with a team of five designers and started designing their own gaming product lines.

The company launched its headsets in early 2008 followed by the launch of its Transport Series of gaming gear bags. By 2010, ASTRO Gaming had 23 employees and had raised more than $5 million in additional funding. In early 2011, the publicly traded Utah-based company, Skullcandy, purchased Astro Gaming for $10.8 million, acquiring all assets. In 2016, Mill Road Capital purchased all outstanding stock of Skullcandy and its subsidiary, Astro Gaming. In 2017, Logitech acquired Astro Gaming from Mill Road for $85 million.

== Esports sponsorship ==
Throughout the years since its launch, the company has worked with professional teams, organizations, and leagues. ASTRO Gaming has sponsored many esports gaming events.
