= Brenda J. Allen =

American academic

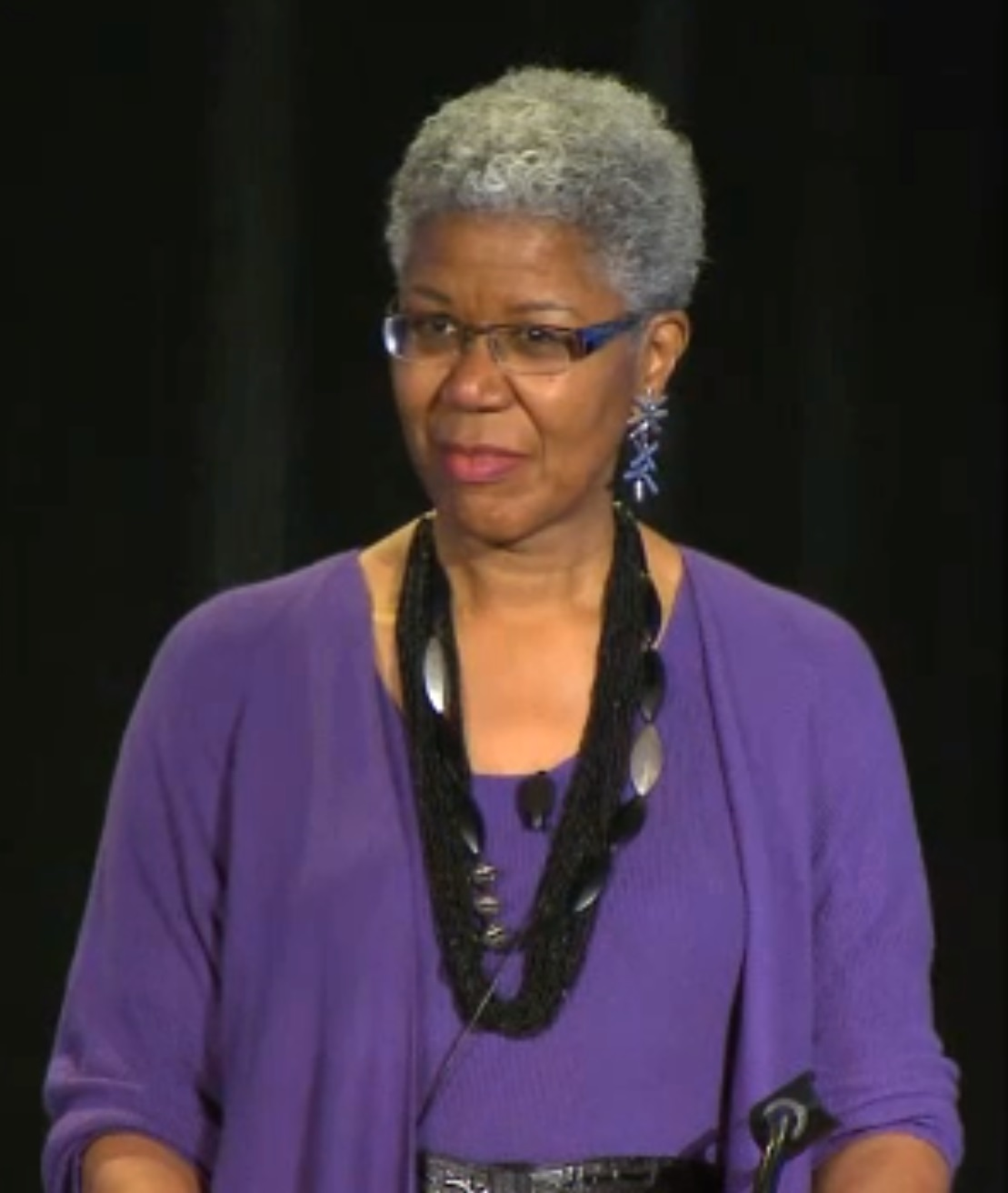
Allen speaks at the National Center for Women & Information Technology Summit Workshop 2012

Brenda J. Allen is an American academic. She is Professor Emerita of Communication and retired Vice Chancellor for Diversity and Inclusion and Professor of Communication at the University of Colorado Denver. Her book, Difference Matters: Communicating Social Identity includes her research on power dynamics and social identity (e.g., gender, race, social class, sexuality, ability status, and age).

== Early life and education ==
Allen grew up in the housing projects in Youngstown, Ohio in the 1950s and 1960s. Allen was the first in her family to attend college, earning her Bachelor of Arts in Communication from Case Western Reserve University in 1972. In 1978, she completed a Master’s program in Organizational Communication at Howard University, where she also earned a Ph.D in Organizational Communication in 1989.

== Career ==
Allen served as Vice Chancellor for Diversity and Inclusion at the University of Colorado Denver, where she also was a Professor of Communications. The focus of Allen's research is diversity, power, and organizational communication. Her book, Difference Matters: Communicating Social Identity examines relationships between communication and social identity.

== Publications ==
- Allen, B. J. (2010) Critical communication pedagogy as a framework for teaching difference. In: D. Mumby (Ed.) Organizing difference: Pedagogy, research, and practice (pp. 103–125). Thousand Oaks, CA: Sage Publications
- Allen, B. J. (2011). Difference Matters (2nd ed.). Waveland Press.
- Allen, B.J. (2016). Difference matters. Spectra, The Magazine of the National Communication Association, 52,1, 8-13.
- Allen, B.J. (2016). Optimizing technology’s promise. EDUCAUSE Review, 56, 28-42.
- Allen, B.J. (2005). Social constructionism. In: S. May and D. Mumby (Eds.). Engaging organizational communication theory and research: Multiple perspectives (pp. 35–53). Thousand Oaks, CA: Sage Publications.
- Allen, B.J. (2010). Social constructions of a black woman's hair: Critical reflections of a graying sistah. In: R. Spellers and K. Moffitt (Eds.). Blackberries and redbones: critical articulations of Black hair/body politics (pp. 66–77). Cresskill, NJ: Hampton Press.
- Allen, B.J. (2007). Theorizing communication and race. Communication Monographs 74, pp. 259–274.
- Allen, B.J. (2016). (When and how) do I tell?: Disclosing social identity in personal relationships. In: D. Braithwaite and J. Wood (Eds.). Casing interpersonal communication: Case studies in personal and social relationships (pp. 173–179). Kendall/Hunt.
- Allen, B. J. (2009). "With you we got a twofer": Challenging the affirmative action hire stereotype. In: E.L. Kirby and M. C. McBride (Eds.). Gender actualized: Cases in communicatively constructing realities (pp. 139–140). Dubuque, IO: Kendall/Hunt.
- Allen, B. J., & Garg, K. (2016). Diversity Matters in Academic Radiology: Acknowledging and Addressing Unconscious Bias. Journal of the American College of Radiology, 13(12), 1426-1432. doi:10.1016/j.jacr.2016.08.016

== Awards ==
- 2016: Leadership in Higher Education Award from the Faculty Council of the CU system
- 2013: Elizabeth D. Gee Memorial Award from the University of Colorado system
- 2008: Master Teacher by the Western States Communication Association
- 2004: Francine Merritt Award for Outstanding Contributions to the Lives of Women in Communication
