= Alan E. Ashcraft Jr. =

American politician and judge (1906–1961)

Member of the Illinois House of Representatives
- In office 1941–1945

Personal details
- Born: Alan Emerson Ashcraft Jr. March 5, 1906 Beloit, Wisconsin, U.S.
- Died: May 6, 1961 (aged 55) Evanston, Illinois, U.S.
- Education: Deerfield Academy; University of Vermont; Northwestern University School of Law
- Profession: Politician, lawyer, judge

Alan Emerson Ashcraft Jr. (March 5, 1906 – May 6, 1961) was an American politician and judge.

== Biography ==
Ashcraft was born in Beloit, Wisconsin. He graduated from Deerfield Academy in Deerfield, Massachusetts. Ashcraft went to University of Vermont and to Northwestern Pritzker School of Law. Ashcraft practiced law in Chicago, Illinois. He lived in Evanston, Illinois and served on the Evanston City Council from 1935 to 1941. Ashcraft then served in the Illinois House of Representatives from 1941 to 1945 and was involved with the Republican Party. Ashcraft served as an Illinois Superior Court judge from 1947 until his death. Ashcraft died in a hospital in Evanston, Illinois following a cerebral hemorrhage.
