= Mark H. Ashcraft =

American academic

Mark Henry Ashcraft (December 8, 1949 – September 6, 2022) was an American academic and the chair of the Department of Psychology at the University of Nevada Las Vegas. He received his PhD in cognitive psychology from the University of Kansas in 1975. His research was primarily in the area of numerical cognition, including topics such as mental arithmetic and math anxiety. He has published multiple books and articles on cognitive psychology, including:

- Human Memory and Cognition. Prentice Hall (1997); ISBN 0-321-01207-0
- Cognition. Prentice Hall; 4th ed. (2005);ISBN 0-13-155271-6

== Death ==
Ashcraft died on September 6, 2022, at his home in Henderson, Nevada, aged 72. He was survived, immediately, by his wife, Mary, and their two children.

== Bibliography ==
- Ashcraft, Mark H. (1998). Priscilla McGeehon (ed.). Fundamentals of Cognition. Addison Wesley Longman. ISBN 0-321-01207-0.
