= Percy Ashcraft =

American politician

Percy Coburn Ashcraft is an American politician, and appointed local government official. A native of Clarksburg, West Virginia, Ashcraft was elected to six terms in the West Virginia House of Delegates from January 1983 – December 1994.

Ashcraft resigned in August 2024 from position of County Administrator for King William County, VA, a role he began in December 2021.

== Early and personal life ==
Ashcraft is married to the former Cynthia Denise Sly and the couple has three children, Emily, Reeve, and Molly.

== Career ==
Before assuming the position in King William, Ashcraft previously held three appointed administrative positions in local government. Beginning his appointed career, Ashcraft served as City Manager of Clarksburg, West Virginia from December 27, 1995, through October 1, 1999. He served as County Administrator in Caroline County, Virginia, from October 12, 1999, through March 11, 2011. Ashcraft then transitioned to a similar role in Prince George County, Virginia, beginning his tenure as County Administrator in March 2011, resigning in December 2021.
