= Don Southerton =

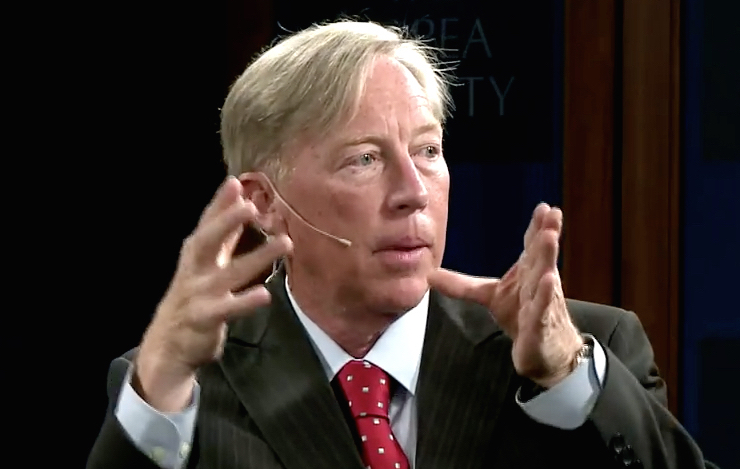
- Born: Honesdale, Pennsylvania
- Education: University of Colorado Denver (BA, History); University of Colorado Denver (MA, History)
- Occupations: Founder & CEO of Bridging Culture Worldwide LLC.; Business consultant and author
- Spouse: Anna Cash-Mitchell (m. 2003 d. 2025)
- Website: www.bridgingculture.com

Donald Southerton is a business consultant, writer, author, and global Korean issues specialist. Southerton, who is a University of Colorado Denver alumnus, taught traditional Korean martial arts before establishing and becoming CEO of Bridging Culture Worldwide LLC. in 2003. Southerton is also the author of a number of books emphasizing on matters related to South Korea. His book Hyundai Way: Transformation was released in May 2026.

== Early life and education ==
A native of Honesdale, Pennsylvania developed his interest on Asian culture while studying in the Mansfield University of Pennsylvania. He received a Bachelor of Arts and a Master of Arts in history from the University of Colorado Denver. Southerton has also taken postgraduate classes in UCLA, University of Southern California, UC San Diego and the Intercultural Institute of California in San Francisco.

== Career ==
Southerton begun training in Tang Soo Do (Moo Duk Kwan) and eventually received his 1st Degree Black Belt in the mid-1970s. He was the cadet martial arts instructor and competition team coach at the United States Military Academy at West Point. In 1987 he was promoted to a master instructor in Tang Soo Do. Southerton was inducted into the Taekwondo Hall of Fame in October 2013. Starting in 1987, he worked as staff development consultant for Bethesda, Maryland-based Educational Funding Company, where he supported the company's Korean American clients, due to his understanding of Korean culture and traditions.

In 2003 he founded and became CEO of Bridging Culture Worldwide, to consult South Korea-based companies operating internationally. Since he has worked with South Korean companies making business in the United States such as Hyundai Motor Company, Kia Motors as well as with American companies, ranging from F&B and Retail, in their effort to introduce themselves into the South Korean markets.

In 2005 Bridging Culture announced it would begin publishing books. The first book, written by Southerton himself, was published in 2005 under the title "The Filleys: 350 Years of American Entrepreneurial Spirit". In 2006 he published "A Yankee in the Land of the Morning Calm", his first novel. He completed the history as a trilogy publishing "A Yankee in the Land of the Morning Calm: Gold & Rail" and "A Yankee in the Land of the Morning Calm: The Northern Frontier" in 2007 and 2013 respectively. In August 2009 he published Chemulpo to Songdo IBD: Korea's International Gateway.

In December 2012 he published a book titled "Korea Facing: Secrets for Success in Korean Global Business". In March 2014 he published the first edition of "Hyundai Way: Hyundai Speed", a book analyzing Hyundai's management style. Beginning 2015, Southerton published "Korea Perspective", a book focusing on daily interaction between Koreans and non-Koreans, in a business environment. Throughout his career Southerton has commented on South Korean related issues in BBC, Korea Times, Korea Herald, The Wall Street Journal and Forbes among others and he has given speeches on South Korean-related topics.

Southerton currently serves as an advisor for a number of global and South Korean groups.
