= Astro Studios =

American design firm

- Type: Private
- Industry: Industrial Design; Graphic Design; Interaction Design
- Founded: 1994; 32 years ago
- Headquarters: San Francisco, California, United States
- Key people: Brett Lovelady, Founder / CEO; Kyle Swen, EVP Design / Partner; Jim Goodell, COO / Partner
- Number of employees: 30 (2011)
- Website: www.astrostudios.com

Astro Studios is an American design firm in San Francisco, California.

The company designed the original Compaq IPAQ Pocket PC, Alienware Computers and Microsoft's Xbox 360 and Xbox 360 accessories. In 1999, Astro Studios received two Design of the Decade Awards by BusinessWeek / Industrial Designers Society of America (IDSA), one for the Kensington Computer Products Group Smart Sockets and the other for Nike Inc's first electronic products, and the original Triax SportsWatch series. Other designs include the Boxee Box, Zune HD,

A spin-off organization, Astro Gaming manufactures gaming headsets. In 2008, the Astro Gaming A40 Audio System became the official licensed headset of Major League Gaming.

Astro Studios has received several awards including Red Dot, the American Institute of Graphic Arts (AIGA) 365 Awards.
