= Auraria =

Auraria may refer to:

- Auraria, Georgia, a town in Lumpkin County, Georgia, United States
- Auraria, Denver, a former territorial capital, now a neighborhood in Colorado
  - Auraria Campus, an educational facility
  - Auraria Library, an academic library
- Auraria (horse) (foaled 1892), winner of the 1895 Melbourne Cup
  - Auraria Stakes, a Group 3 Australian Thoroughbred horse race
