= Auraria, Denver =

Early neighborhood of Denver, Colorado, United States

Auraria
- historic mining camp now a neighborhood
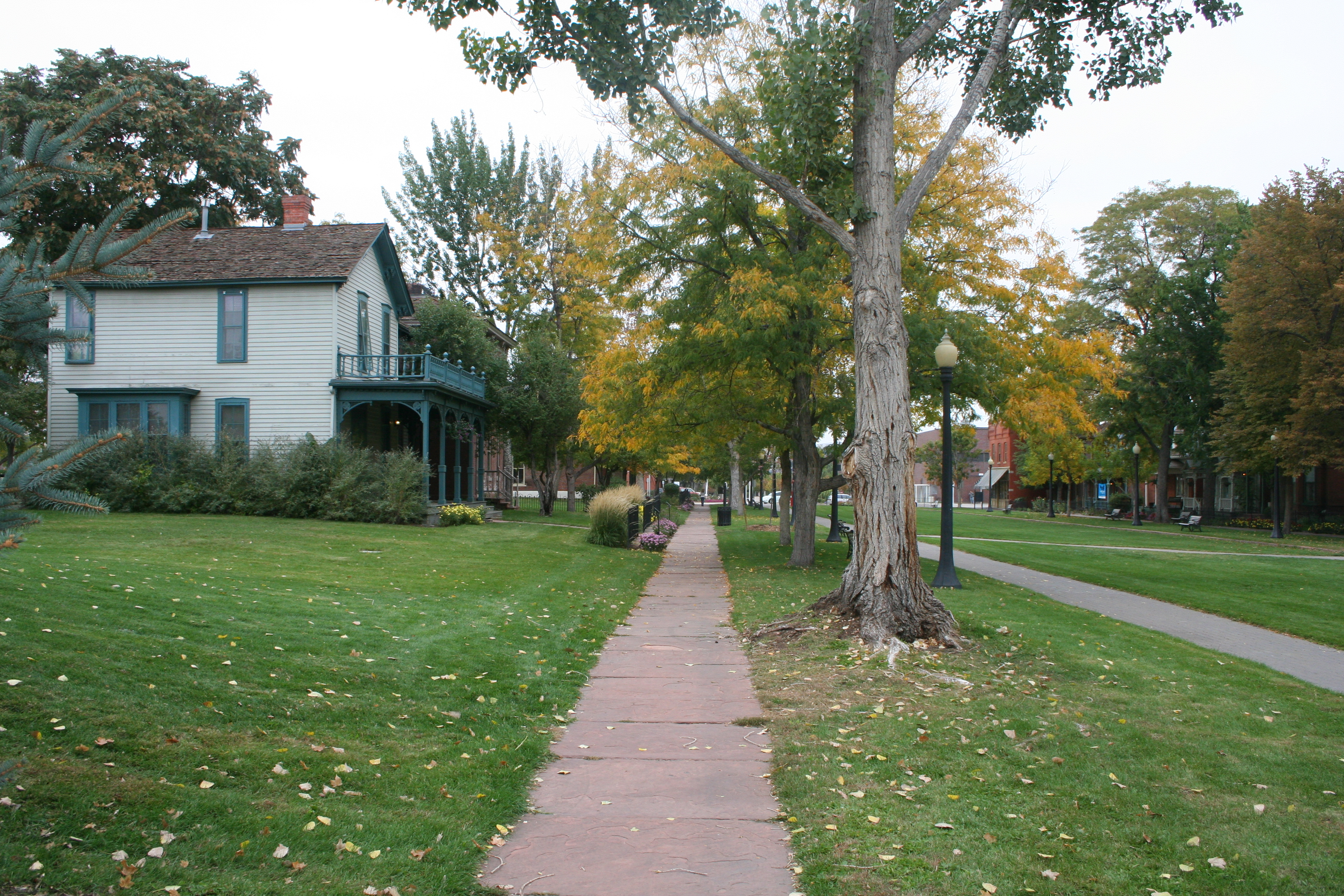
- The Ninth Street Historic Park in Denver, Colorado
- Etymology: Auraria, Georgia
- Location of Auraria, Denver, Colorado. Auraria (Colorado)
- Coordinates: 39.7428°N 105.0052°W
- Country: United States
- State: Colorado
- City and County: Denver
- Established: October 3, 1858
- Founder: William Greeneberry Russell
- Elevation: 5,180 ft (1,580 m)

Population (2010)
  - Total: 705
- ZIP Codes: 80204

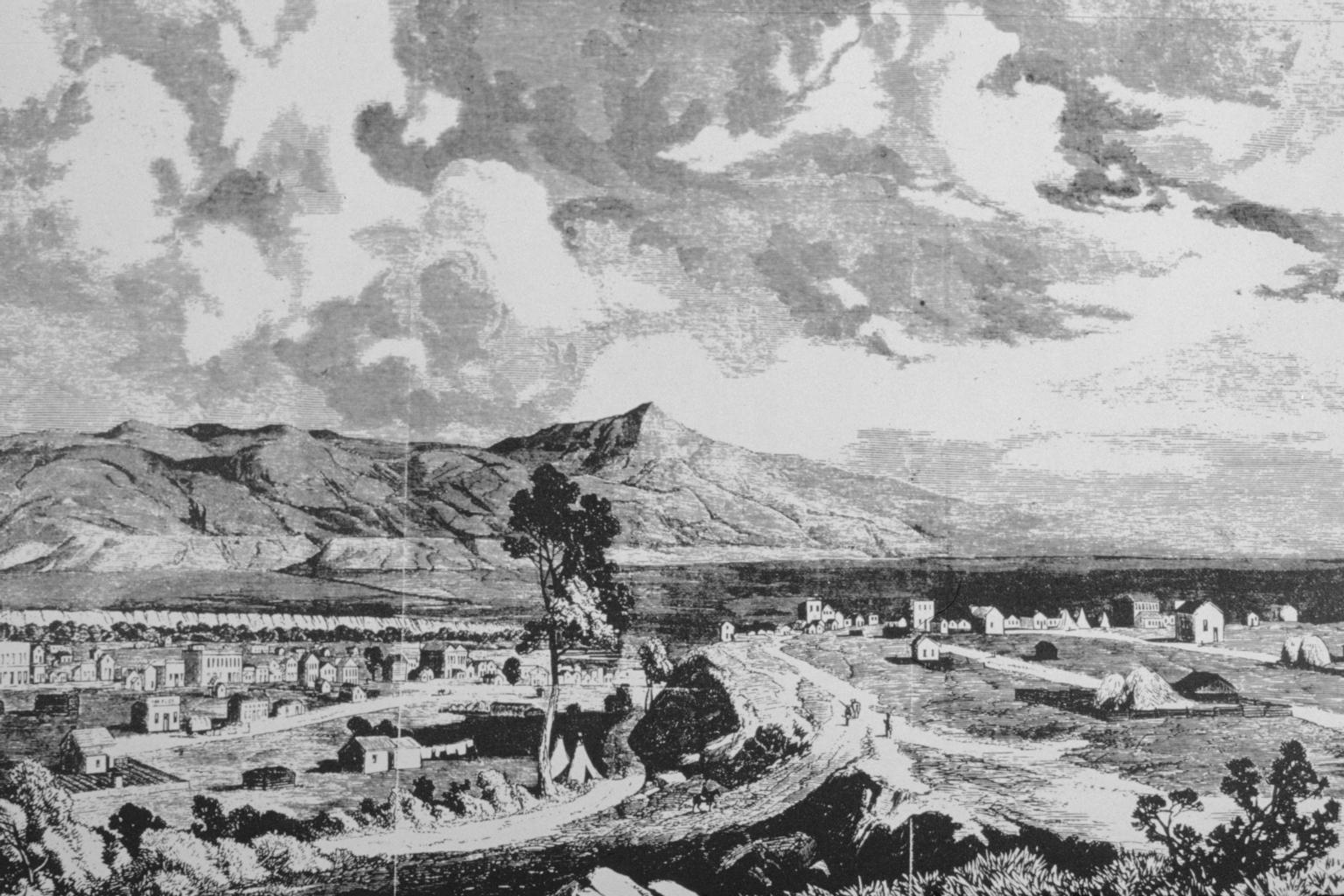
Illustration of Auraria, Colorado (1860)

Auraria was a gold mining camp established in 1858 in the Kansas Territory of the United States. Today it survives in its original location as a neighborhood of Denver, Colorado, immediately south of the confluence of Cherry Creek and the South Platte River.

== Geography ==
Auraria is in central Denver, just west of downtown, and is roughly triangular, bordered by Colfax Avenue on the south, Cherry Creek to the northeast, and South Platte River to the northwest.

== History ==
On October 3, 1858, a group of Georgia prospectors led by Green Russell established the townsite of Auraria south of Cherry Creek near the Cherry Creek Diggings, over a month before a group of Kansas Territory speculators led by William Larimer established the rival Denver City on the other side of Cherry Creek. Henry Allen, a surveyor, laid the town platte and was Auraria town company's first president. The town was named for the gold mining settlement of Auraria, Georgia. On October 29, Charles H. Blake and A.J. Williams opened a mercantile business out of wagons in Auraria.

On January 18, 1859, the United States Post Office Department authorized the first three post offices in the Pike's Peak gold region: Auraria, Kansas Territory; Montana, Kansas Territory; and St. Vrain, Nebraska Territory. Henry Allen was the first postmaster of Auraria. On, April 15, 1859, ten delegates from six communities in the Pike's Peak Country met in convention at Dick Wooton’s store in Auraria to pass resolutions to organize a Provisional State of Jefferson. On April 23, William Byers published the first edition of the Rocky Mountain News, the Rocky Mountain region's first newspaper, at Auraria. At an election on September 24, voters rejected the proposed state, but on October 24, voters approved the establishment of the Provisional Government of the Territory of Jefferson.

Auraria ceased to exist as a separate town on December 3, 1859, when the Jefferson Territory granted a charter to the consolidated City of Denver, Auraria, and Highland, which would come to be known as just Denver City, the territorial capital and seat of Arrappahoe County. The Auraria post office was renamed Denver City on February 11, 1860. The Jefferson Territory was itself superseded on February 28, 1861, when U.S. President James Buchanan signed An Act to provide a temporary Government for the Territory of Colorado.

Auraria suffered a devastating flood on May 19, 1864. In response, many businesses left the neighborhood. Some speculate that Auraria never truly recovered from this event. However for the next century Auraria continued as a neighborhood mixing industry, commerce and housing. Residents included working class and varying immigrant populations. By the 1920s Auraria's residents were largely Hispanic.

In 1965, parts of Auraria were again heavily damaged by flooding, leading city leaders to describe the neighborhood as blighted and in need of urban renewal. In 1969 Denver citizens approved a bond issue to purchase approximately half of Auraria's land area to form an educational campus. An estimated 400 to 900 residents were relocated, along with 249 businesses. Demolition began on March 10, 1973, and the area became the home of University of Colorado Denver, Metropolitan State University, and Community College of Denver. The Displaced Aurarian Scholarship program offers free tuition to these institutions for direct descendants of those displaced from Auraria. A few buildings from old Auraria are still standing today.

The name "Auraria" survives in Denver as the neighborhood along the west bank of Cherry Creek to the east bank of the South Platte River, bordered on the south by Colfax Avenue.

== Pending redevelopment ==
A large section of Auraria not included in the Auraria Higher Education Campus, and located northwest of Auraria Parkway, is occupied by two large entertainment complexes and is bisected by the RTD lightrail tracks. Elitch Gardens is currently northwest of the rail lines, whereas Ball Arena is to the south. Plans have been proposed that suggest changes to these areas and have moved through some of the approval processes, but no firm date has been set for redevelopment. Despite mitigation after the 1965 flood, this part of Auraria is still largely within the 100-year flood plain, so rechanneling the South Platte River is a precondition for the developments.

In 2018, the City and County of Denver approved rezoning and development agreements for The "River Mile", 58 acres currently occupied by Elitch Gardens. To make room for this mixed use development, Elitch Gardens will move, but no date has been set.

In 2024, the City and County of Denver approved rezoning and development agreements for 64 acres of Auraria centered around the Ball Arena (which will remain).

== Arts and culture ==
=== Attractions ===
- Auraria Campus
- Auraria Library
- Ball Arena
- Confluence Park
- Elitch Gardens
- Emmanuel Shearith Israel Chapel - Denver's oldest church building
- Meow Wolf Convergence Station
- Ninth Street Historic Park
- St. Cajetan’s Church - Historic Hispanic church
- St. Elizabeth's Church - Only active church on the Auraria campus
- Tivoli Student Union

== Sports ==
Auraria contains the Ball Arena arena, home of the Colorado Avalanche, Denver Nuggets, and Colorado Mammoth, as well as the venue of concerts and other events.

== Education ==
The neighborhood of Auraria is dominated by the Auraria Campus, which is home to three institutions of higher learning: University of Colorado Denver (CU Denver), Metropolitan State University of Denver (MSU Denver), and Community College of Denver (CCD). Vestiges of the old neighborhood remain, however, in the Ninth Street Historic Park on the campus. The three institutions occupy the bulk of the Auraria Neighborhood, so there is very little permanent residence. The schools mainly serve commuter students, though housing has recently been developed at Campus Village Apartments (UCD), Auraria Student Lofts, and Regency Student Housing.

== Media ==
There are two student newspapers that are published in Auraria. The University of Colorado Denver's newspaper is called the "CU Denver Sentry" and Metropolitan State University's newspaper is "Met Media".

== Transportation ==
Auraria is serviced by the Regional Transportation District. In addition to service from several bus lines, it has four light rail stations within its boundaries: Colfax at Auraria station, Auraria West station, Empower Field at Mile High station and Ball Arena–Elitch Gardens station.

== See also ==
- City and County of Denver
- Denver-Aurora-Lakewood, CO Metropolitan Statistical Area
- Front Range Urban Corridor
- List of ghost towns in Colorado
- List of neighborhoods in Denver
- List of populated places in Colorado
- List of post offices in Colorado
- Pike's Peak gold rush
