= Regency Hotel =

Regency Hotel may refer to many hotels:

- Hyatt Regency, a hotel brand owned by Hyatt Hotels Corporation, some of which members feature revolving restaurants
- Loews Regency hotels owned by Loews Hotels:
  - Loews Regency New York, in New York City
  - Loews Regency San Francisco, in San Francisco
- The Regency, Denver, also known as "Regency Student Housing", in Colorado, US, a student housing community which replaced the Regency Hotel
- The Regency Hotel, Dublin. Since renamed the Bonnington, it was the scene of the killing of David Byrne
- The Regency Palace, Amman, one of the tallest buildings in Amman
