= Colorado Alliance of Research Libraries =

U.S. library consortium

- Established: 1974; 52 years ago
- Type: Nonprofit
- Tax ID no.: 84-0819602
- Headquarters: Denver, Colorado, US
- Region served: Colorado and Wyoming
- Executive Director: George Machovec
- Website: coalliance.org

The Colorado Alliance of Research Libraries is a US nonprofit cooperative of approximately 20 academic and public libraries in Colorado and Wyoming.

== Purpose ==
The Colorado Alliance of Research Libraries was established in 1974. One major function of the Alliance is to share resources and provide the best terms and price to its members by group purchasing. Projects of the Alliance over the years include:

- Prospector, a unified catalog of academic, public, and other libraries in Colorado and Wyoming (current)
- Gold Rush, a database of online article resources (fulltext journals and abstracts) and access options; now primarily an analytics tool for library collections (current)
- Alliance Digital Repository, a consortial repository service supporting the preservation of, management of, and access to digital content (current)
- CARL and UnCover (historical)

Prospector also provides a faster and more convenient mechanism for interlibrary loans from member libraries, which can be ordered by patrons directly from the catalog.

== UnCover ==
CARL started as a character-based access system to resources, particularly catalogs of participating libraries as they were being computerized, available via dial-up internet long before the advent of World Wide Web. The Alliance system eventually included a subset of Dialog. The flagship Alliance product was UnCover, an article index database. UnCover provides free article search and access to the article text for a fee. The product was spun off in 1988 into a for-profit company, later owned by Knight Ridder and then Dialog before becoming briefly Uncover, Inc. In 2000, UnCover was acquired by Ingenta and is now accessible as a part of Ingentaconnect.

== Members ==
The following libraries are members of the Alliance:

Library	University
Arthur Lakes Library	Colorado School of Mines
Auraria Library	Community College of Denver; Metropolitan State University of Denver; University of Colorado Denver
CSU Libraries	Colorado State University
CSU-Pueblo University Library	Colorado State University Pueblo
Denver Public Library	N/A
Douglas County Libraries	N/A
Henry Strauss Health Sciences Library	University of Colorado Anschutz
Jefferson County Library	N/A
Kraemer Family Library	University of Colorado at Colorado Springs
Leslie J. Savage Library	Western Colorado University
McDermott Library and the Base Library	United States Air Force Academy
Penrose Library	University of Denver
Regis Libraries	Regis University
Tomlinson Library	Colorado Mesa University
Tutt Library	Colorado College
University Libraries	University of Colorado Boulder
UNC Libraries	University of Northern Colorado
UW Libraries	University of Wyoming
