= Henry Allen (Colorado settler) =

19th-century American settler

Member of the Idaho Territorial House of Representatives
- In office 1865–1866
- Constituency: Boise County

Personal details
- Born: Henry Allen c. 1815 Marlborough (Upper Marlboro), Maryland
- Died: February 18, 1871 Los Angeles, California
- Political party: Democratic
- Spouse: Susan Benner
- Children: 2

Henry Allen (c. 1815 – February 18, 1871) was an American pioneer and politician. He served in the United States Army before settling in Council Bluffs, where he was a postmaster. He was at the front of the Pike's Peak Gold Rush, arriving in Denver of the Kansas Territory (now the state of Colorado) in October 1858. He prospected for gold and was the first official postmaster of the Pikes Peak region. As a surveyor, he helped establish Auraria, Highland, which later came part of the city of Denver. He was a founder of a company that diverted water from the South Platte River through irrigation ditches. He held the first meeting in his cabin for what became the Auraria Masonic Lodge. He was a delegate from Auraria for the first Constitutional Convention of the Jefferson Territory. Allen and his wife lived in mining towns in Colorado, Idaho, and Montana. Due to poor health, Henry and Susan Allen moved to California, where Allen died in 1871.

== Early life and United States Army ==
Henry H. Allen was born around 1815 in Marlborough (Upper Marlboro), Maryland. His father was born outside of the United States.

Allen enlisted in the United States Army on March 25, 1844, at Fort Moultrie (Sullivan's Island, South Carolina), he served in Puebla City, Mexico. He was discharged as a private November 1, 1847 due to a disability, but he had been identified at times as Major and then Colonel Henry Allen.

== Marriage and children ==
He married Susan Benner, who was born in Pennsylvania between 1809 and 1819. Their daughters were Kate and Lydia, both born in Pennsylvania about 1846 and 1844, respectively.

Allen settled in Denver in 1858, followed by his wife and daughters in July 1859. Lydia may have been the first marriage in Auraria. She married John B. Atkins, which was reported on October 16, 1858, in the Rocky Mountain News. It was reported to have been the first marriage reported in Jefferson Territory. They lived in Council Bluffs. Kate married William Kruse. The couple died within one day of each other in August 1927 in Fairfield, Ohio.

== Settle in the west ==
Around 1854, Allen and his family moved west to Council Bluffs in present-day Iowa. Allen worked as a surveyor and lived in Kane, Pottawattamie County, Iowa in 1856. On December 9, 1857, he was appointed postmaster.

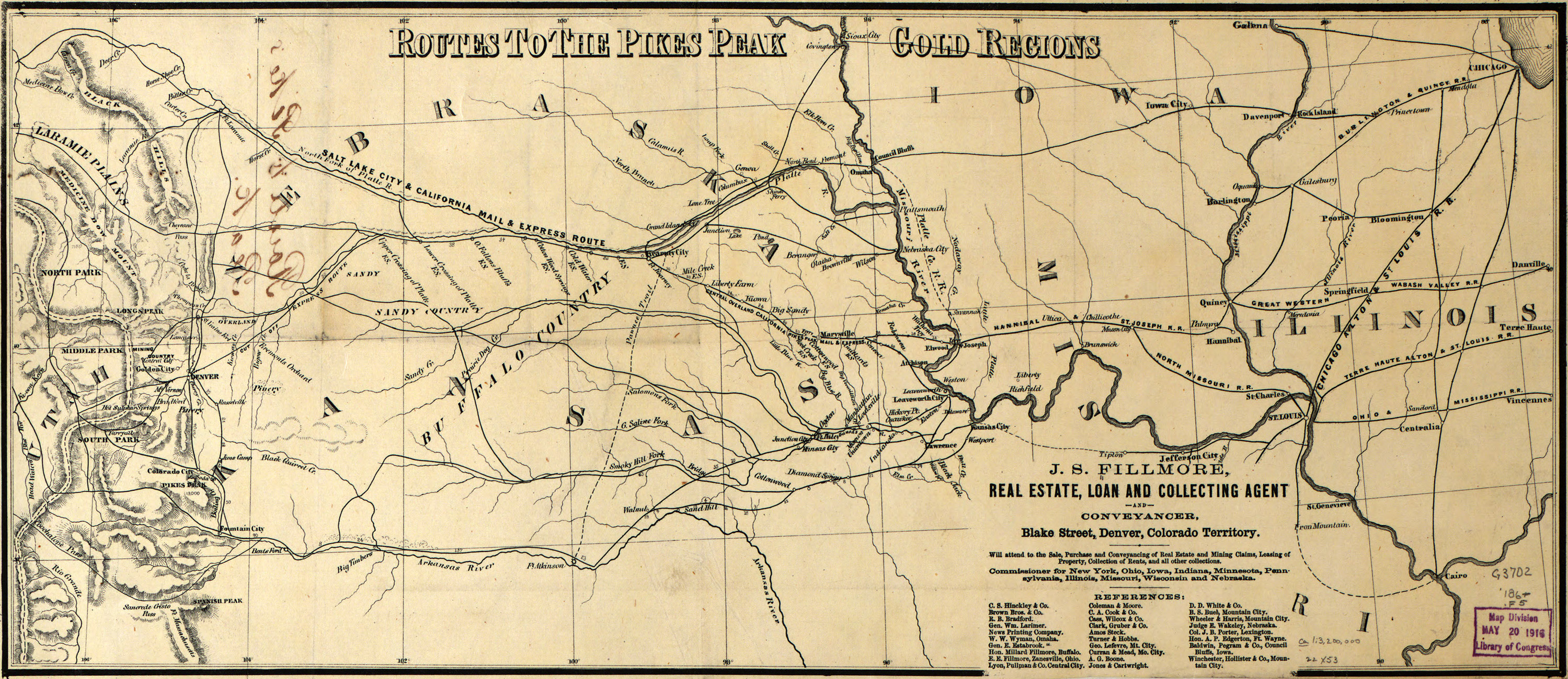
Map of the routes to the Pike's Peak gold fields. The trail from Council Bluff to Denver along the Platte River and South Platte River

He went to Denver with 14 other people, arriving at the mouth of Cherry Creek on October 26, 1858. He came during the early days of the Pike's Peak Gold Rush, to prospect for gold. At that time Denver was in the Kansas Territory. He was a practical surveyor. William Foster assisted him in setting up the town plat for Auraria and was president of the town company. Allen was among those who helped establish the Highland town company. (Note: Four town companies of Auraria, Highland, Denver City, and St. Charles were later consolidated into the City of Denver.)

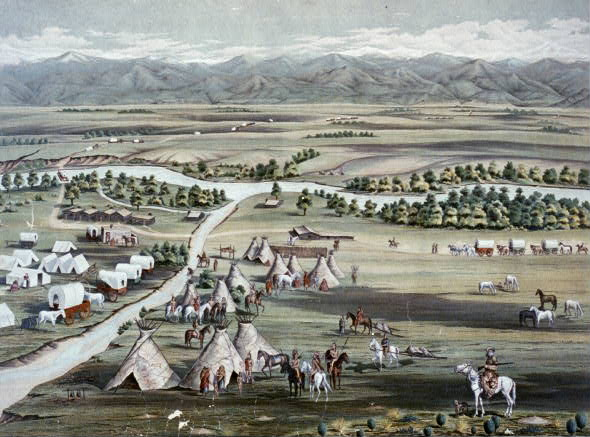
Painting of Denver, at the confluence of Cherry Creek and the South Platte River, in 1859

Allen was one of the original stockholders of Auraria and had a cabin there. On November 3, 1858, the first meeting of Masons in the gold regions was held at his cabin. Attendees included Charles Blake, George Lehow, William M. Slaughter, and Dr. Russell. Allen later became the Worshipful Master of Auraria Lodge. He was the first post master of the Masonic Lodge #5 from 1858 to 1860. It is Colorado's oldest Masonic lodge.

Allen was a postmaster in Auraria, the first "regularly constituted postmaster" in the Pikes Peak region. He purchased a number of lots in Auraria and in July 1859, his wife Susan and their grown daughters moved there. The community was mostly of men, but some women, like the Allen women, continued to arrive with the influx of people that came during the gold rush. The Minnehaha Town and Marble Company was formed in November 1859, and he was its president.

He held a meeting to consider forming the State of Jefferson and was the delegate from Auraria to the first Constitutional Convention. He was president of the first territorial council of the Jefferson Territory and he signed laws enacted in December 1859.

D.C. Oakes and William N. Byers both wrote guides to the Pike's Peak region that some believed made promises about quick success. Some of those who relied on the booklet were disappointed when they reached the Denver and Pikes Peak area. William Larimor and Allen received some of the blame, too. Allen wrote of fellow immigrants to the Council Bluffs Bugle on May 18, 1859:

A great many calculated that they could make a fortune in a few days, and when they came out, finding that it was going to take work to do it — they were in a wild county — no female society — no provisions but wild game — they began to think of their happy home in the States, and commenced singing 'Do they miss me at home' and at once started off to see if they were missed.

— Henry Allen

He was one of the founders of the Colorado Hydraulic Company on February 2, 1860. The company constructed irrigation ditches to divert water from the South Platte River to what was called the City ditch, or the Platte Water Company's ditch.

Allen prospected for gold in the mountains near the headwaters of Vasquez Creek (which became known as Clear Creek). The Allens lived in mining towns in Colorado, Idaho, and Montana, with varying degrees of success. Allen worked in Montana at the head of a large mining company.

While living at Buena Vista Bar in Idaho Territory in 1865, Allen was elected as a Democrat to the Idaho Territorial House of Representatives from Boise County.

== Later years and death ==
He moved to Los Angeles, California, where he was a farmer. He moved due to his health about two years before his death of stomach cancer on February 18, 1871. (Note: William N. Byers reported in 1899 that Allen died in 1865 in California.) At the time, Allen was a member of the Los Angeles Lodge F.

Susan returned to Montana and lived with her daughter. She died in March 1908 at Laurin, Montana (now a ghost town).
