= Douglas County Libraries =

Library system in Colorado, United States

- Location: Douglas County, Colorado, U.S.
- Established: 1966
- Branches: 7

Collection
- Size: 689,000

Access and use
- Circulation: 8,055,060
- Population served: 292,167

Other information
- Director: Robert (Bob) Pasicznyuk
- Employees: 336
- Website: https://www.dcl.org

Douglas County Libraries is a public library system created in 1966, serving Douglas County, Colorado, in the United States. It currently operates seven branches over a combined population of approximately 300,000 residents, and offers a variety of library services as well as public local archives for the county and education services. The library system also has partnered with the Colorado Parks and Wildlife system to offer state park passes which can be checked out with a library card.

== History ==
Douglas County Libraries was established in November 1966, when the Douglas County Board of Commissioners appropriated $5,000 for library operations for the following year. Philanthropist Philip S. Miller and his wife, Jerri, donated $25,000 for library construction in May 1967. The library opened at a temporary space at 311 Third St, Castle Rock, Colorado in August 1967. On May 2, 1969, the library moved to a more permanent location at 303 N. Gilbert Street in Castle Rock.

The first book depository in Parker, Colorado opened in a small building, which no longer exists, on the north side of Main Street. The building was generously leased to the library volunteer staff by the late Charles O'Brien for $1. When a fire damaged the building which housed the Parker book depository, the library moved to the basement of the Ruth Memorial Methodist Episcopal Church; it officially became then part of the Douglas County Public Library System.

In June 1980, the Library Board announced plans to rename Castle Rock Library after Philip S. Miller. Formal dedication occurred on August 8, 1980.

The Parker branch moved to 19801 East Main Street with a dedication ceremony on June 7, 1985.

In March 1990, the Douglas County Public Library District was formed by voters, creating an independent taxing district to fund library operations. November 1990 saw the advent of patrons' ability to dial into the library from their computer modems to view the libraries' electronic catalog. By 1991, patrons were able to put holds on books through their home computers/modems.

In 1992, Douglas County Libraries became the first Dynix public library in Colorado to connect to the Internet.

Philip S. Miller died at age 99 in June 1995. The library district receives approximately $150,000 per year from its 10% share of the Miller Charitable Trust Fund. Also in 1995, the library district purchased Crossroads Lane Bowling Alley in Parker, which became the new Parker Library on December 16, 1995.

Douglas County Libraries launched its website in 1996.

The ability to notify patrons of holds and overdue notices by email was introduced in 1998. The Lone Tree Library opened on October 24, 1998, replacing an older branch library called Oakes Mill.

On July 15, 2000, the Highlands Ranch Library opened at 9292 Ridgeline Blvd in Highlands Ranch. The branch had been previously located in a retail space near Broadway and Plaza Drive.

In 2003, Douglas County Libraries received a branding redesign complete with new logo and website. In September 2003, the Philip S Miller Library moved to a new facility (100 S Wilcox Street, Castle Rock).

Douglas County Libraries became the third-largest library system in Colorado in 2007 and was ranked second in Colorado for circulation. Douglas County Libraries was awarded the 2007 John Cotton Dana Award, the American Library Association's "most prestigious award" that honors outstanding library public relations. The library district was recognized for the promotion of the Page to Stage Productions literary theater tour.

In 2008, Douglas County Libraries, in partnership with Douglas County School District RE-1, offered the first GED testing opportunities in the county. By the end of the year, 73 students had passed the GED.

In 2016 and through 2017, Douglas County Libraries expanded the Parker, Castle Pines and Lone Tree libraries, making them bigger and more modern to cope with higher numbers in circulation.

== Branches ==
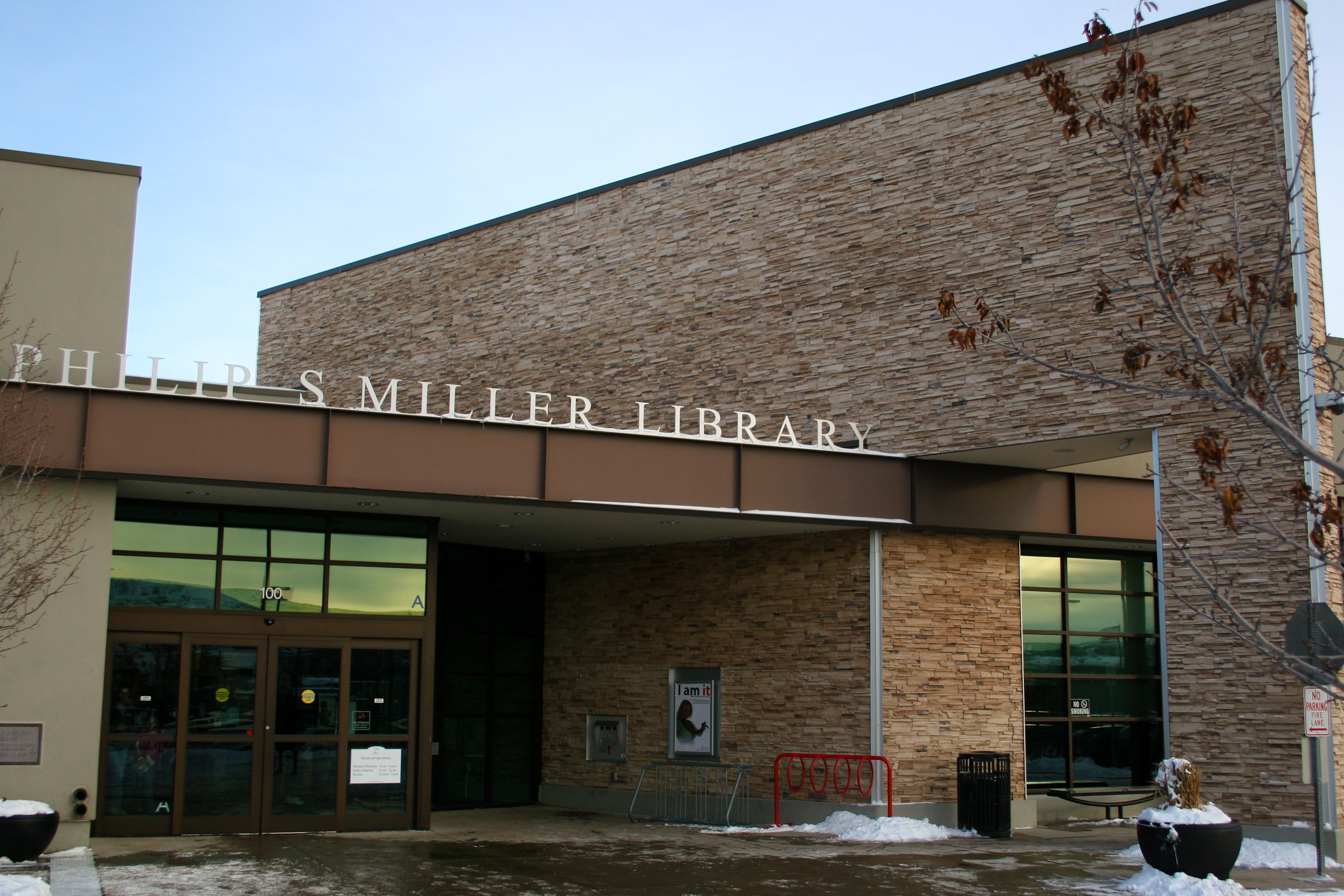
Philip S. Miller Library, 2011

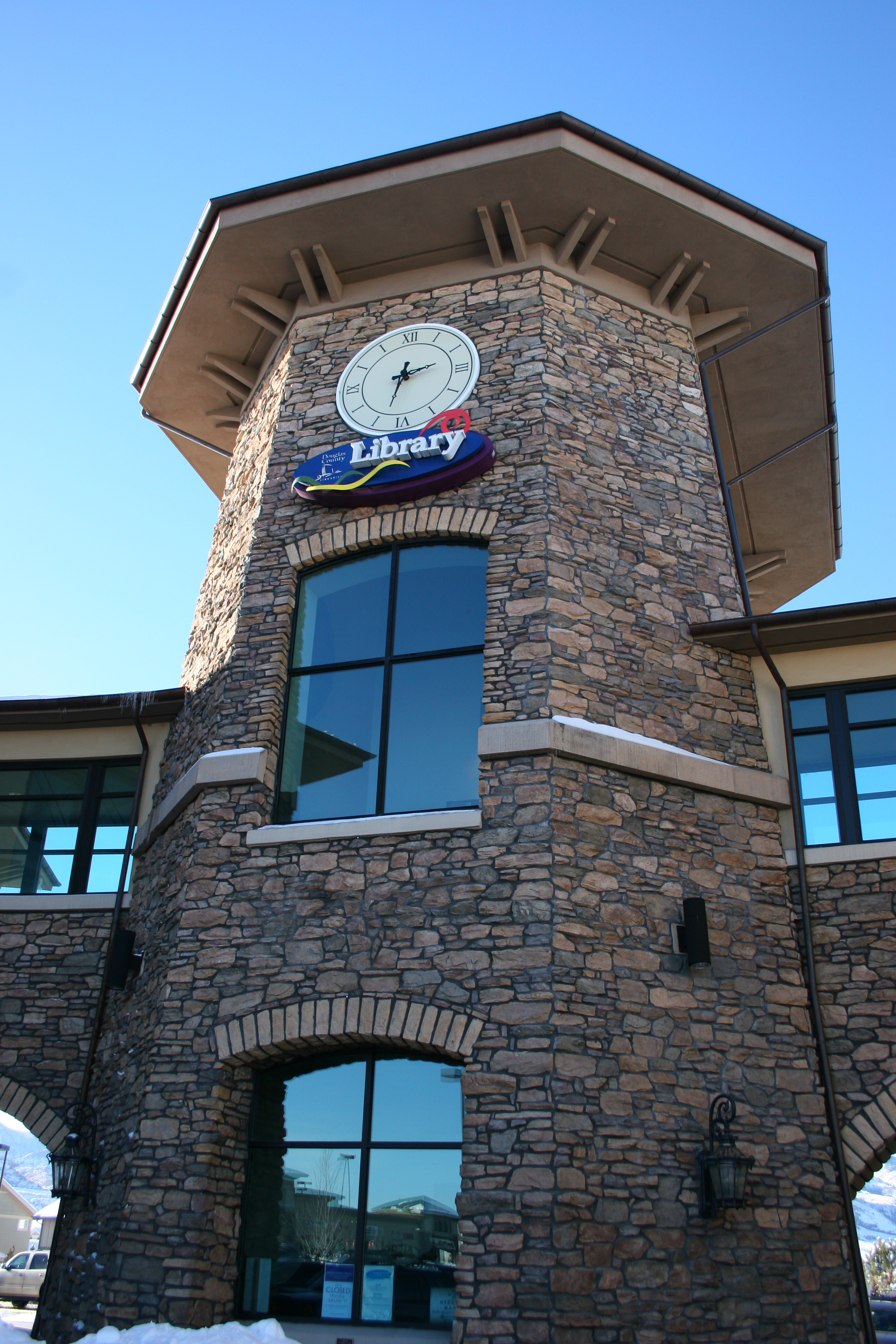
Roxborough Library, 2011

- Castle Rock - Philip S. Miller
- Castle Pines
- Lone Tree
- Louviers
- Highlands Ranch
- Parker
- Roxborough

== Services ==
Douglas County Libraries has a stated mission of elevating the community by inspiring a love of reading, discovery, and connection. All of its services tie back to its mission.

Bark for Books allows school-age children to improve their literacy skills by reading to a dog from Intermountain Therapy Animals.

Cuddle Up and Read, Douglas County Libraries provides books on parenting information and an application for a special baby library card to parents of newborns.

Adult Learning Center offers free GED preparation and live-online tutors to help prepare for the test. Citizenship Classes are offered twice a year to prepare candidates for the US Citizenship interview.

Douglas County Library participates in the Check Out Colorado State Parks program, offering state park passes and a kit that includes a backpack, binoculars, information about the parks, and field guides for education and exploration to library users. This program is available to Colorado libraries through a partnership between the Colorado State Library and Colorado Parks and Wildlife. Parks passes can be used at any of Colorado's state parks.

Douglas County Libraries Archives & Local History collects and preserves the history of Douglas County and assists the public with Douglas County history, Colorado history, and genealogy topics.

Douglas County Libraries is also a member of the Prospector Alliance, in partnership with other libraries throughout Colorado as well as Wyoming.
