= Auraria Campus =

Academic campus in Denver, Colorado, home to three higher education institutions

Coordinates: 39°44′35″N 105°00′20″W

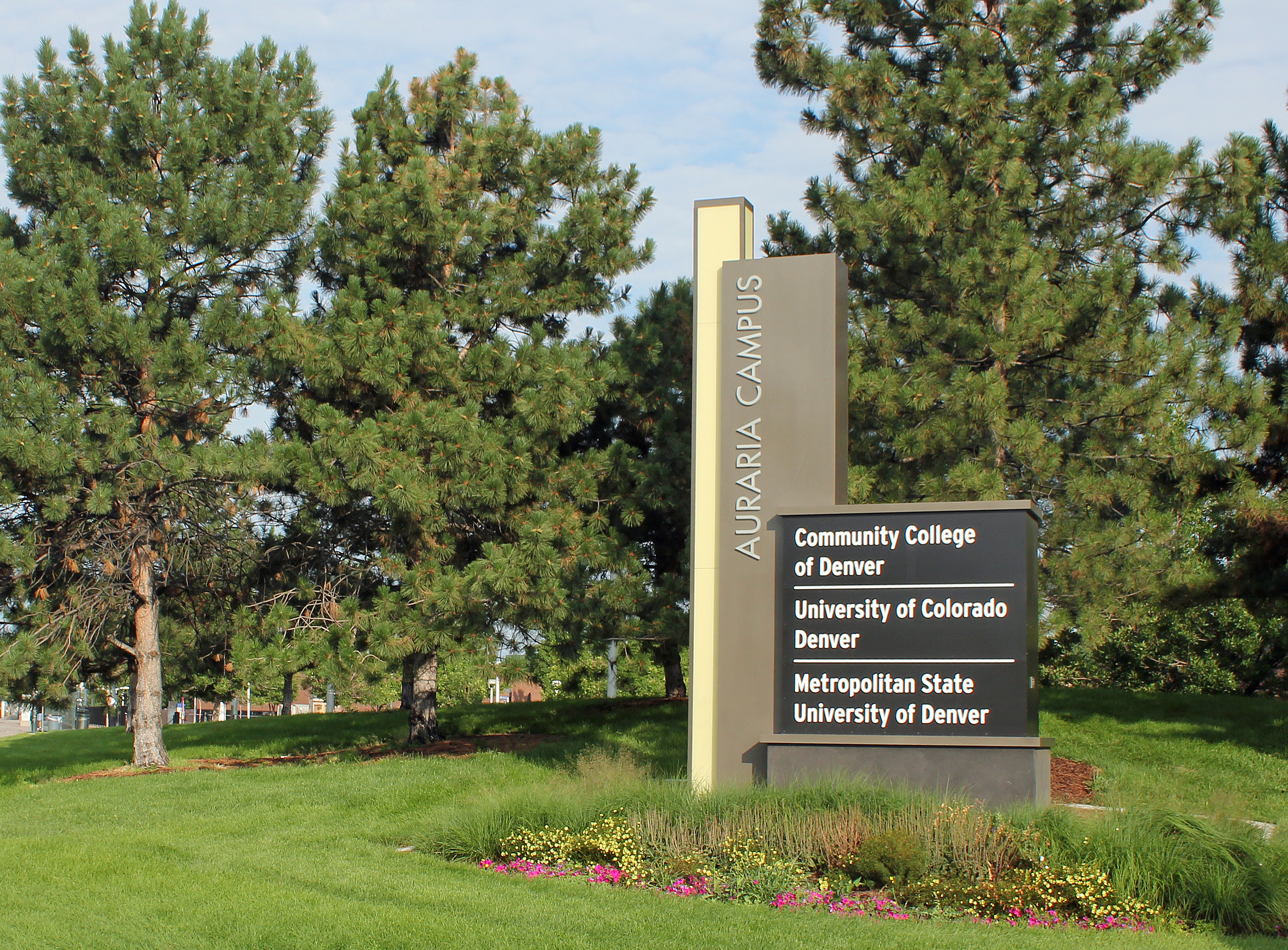
- One of the Auraria Campus signs, located at the intersection of Kalamath and Colfax in Denver, Colorado
- Type: Educational facility
- Affiliations: Auraria Higher Education Center, University of Colorado Denver, Community College of Denver, and Metropolitan State University of Denver
- Total staff: 5,000
- Students: 38,000
- Location: Denver, Colorado, United States
- Campus: 150-acre; Urban
- Website: https://www.ahec.edu/

Auraria Campus is an educational facility located near downtown Denver, Colorado in the United States. The campus houses facilities of three separate universities and colleges: the University of Colorado Denver (CU Denver), Community College of Denver (CCD), and Metropolitan State University of Denver (MSU Denver). In 2017, there were approximately 54,812 students between the three schools, with rapid growth projected over the following few years. However, due to the COVID-19 pandemic and declining enrollment, the collective student population in 2022 was approximately 38,000, with an additional 5,000 faculty and staff.

The shared services of Auraria Campus are managed and operated by the Auraria Higher Education Center (AHEC), which is a state agency created statutorily pursuant to Article 70, Title 23 of the Colorado Revised Statutes. AHEC manages an early learning center, parking services, campus safety and police, facilities maintenance and custodial services, and distribution services and contracts with outside entities to provide food services and a campus bookstore. AHEC also issues campus-wide policies pertaining to these shared services. AHEC is governed by the Auraria Board of Directors which has eleven members, with representatives serving from all three institutions of higher education housed on the campus.

The campus is located southwest of downtown, on the east side of the South Platte River and south of Cherry Creek, near the site of the original Auraria mining camp settlement of 1859.

The Auraria Campus is also home to Tivoli Union, the historical, and currently operating after a hiatus, brewery. The Tivoli/Student Union houses a lounge, brewery, cafeteria, and a significant number of student organizations for all three schools. The building also has functioned as a mall at one point.

The 9th St. Park borders the campus to the west, housing community outreach programs, academic departments, and other campus offices as well as a fast-food restaurant in the Mercantile building. Student housing consists of City Heights and Lynx Crossing (formerly known as Campus Village).

In 2024, the Auraria Campus Master Plan was released. The majority of the campus is set to be redeveloped into a mixed-use neighborhood, largely connecting the campus to downtown and other surrounding neighborhoods. Various construction and campus improvement projects have begun around campus.

== CU Denver Neighborhood ==
=== Lawrence Street Center ===
The Lawrence Street Center houses CU Denver's School of Public Affairs, and the School of Education and Human Development, as well as the Graduate School. It also includes many classrooms, and administrative offices, including the office of the chancellor and provost.

=== CU Denver Building ===
The CU Denver Building houses CU Denver's College of Architecture and Planning, as well as the department of Digital Arts and Media. It contains classrooms, studio spaces, computer labs, a design fabrication lab, 3-D digital animation labs, a visual resource center, and faculty and administration offices.

=== Business School ===
CU Denver's Business School is accredited among the top 5% of Business Schools in the world. This state-of-the-art building was renovated and opened in 2012 and contains several classrooms, computer labs, study rooms, and advising offices.

=== North Classroom Building ===
Originally built in 1987, the North Classroom building is the largest building in the CU Denver Neighborhood of campus at 257,500 square feet. It is the primary classroom building for CU Denver, including over 30 classrooms, lecture halls, common areas for study, and a two-story glass brick atrium with the Courtyard Cafe. It houses the College of Engineering and Applied Science and the College of Liberal Arts and Sciences. It is scheduled for a $33 million renovation which will update interior aesthetics and technology as well as building systems and efficiency improvements. The design phase is currently underway, with construction expected to start mid-2016.

=== Student Commons Building ===
The Student Commons Building is a 146,000 square foot building that opened in September, 2014 and cost $60.5 million. It serves the University of Colorado - Denver, and includes the Admissions, Financial Aid, Student Affairs, and Disability offices, as well as several classrooms and lecture halls. The building was named "Best New Building in Denver" by Westword Magazine. It was designed from the ground up with students in mind and contains many places to sit, relax, and study. It was also designed to be a link between Denver's Larimer Square in downtown and the Auraria Campus.

=== Lola & Rob Salazar Student Wellness Center ===
The Salazar Wellness Center offers academic and athletic services to students, including study rooms, a lap pool and spa, weight rooms, a climbing wall, and a rental shop for bicycles and other outdoor athletic equipment. The center is named for the Salazar Family Foundation, a prominent philanthropic project in Denver.

== MSU Denver Neighborhood ==
=== Jordan Student Success Building ===
The Jordan Student Success Building, funded entirely by student-approved fees, was the first building in the MSU Denver Neighborhood. The building added approximately 145,000 square feet of space on campus for classrooms and offices, specifically for MSU Denver students and professors, providing a centralized location for programming and support services.

=== Aerospace and Engineering Sciences Building ===
Opening in 2017, MSU Denver's Aerospace and Engineering Sciences building is home to the university's Advanced Manufacturing Sciences Institute and space for several related companies as part of a workforce-development public-private partnership model. The AES Building is located next to the Jordan Student Success Building and has won recognition for its facility design.

=== MSU Denver Assembly Athletic Complex ===
This 13 acre complex was completed in 2015 at a cost of almost $24 million. It includes a 20,000 square foot building containing locker room and a state-of-the-art weight room and athletic training room, student-athlete lounge, and meeting rooms. Outside, there are facilities to accommodate MSU Denver's Roadrunners baseball, softball, soccer, and tennis teams.

=== SpringHill Suites by Marriott Denver Downtown & MSU Denver Hospitality Learning Center ===
The Center includes the professionally managed 150-room SpringHill Suites by Marriott Denver Downtown, conference center, and academic building. The academic building has 30,000 square feet of space including classrooms, labs, and a student-run restaurant. Labs include a light sensory analysis lab for wine, spirits, and beer classes, a 4,000 bottle wine cellar management lab, tourism lab, and events lab. It also contains a high-tech food demonstration theater. In 2023, the Charlie Papazian Brewing Education Lab was completed to replace the brew lab in the Tivoli Student Union.

== CCD Neighborhood ==
=== CCD Confluence ===
The Confluence Building, opened May 2013, houses Community College of Denver's Registration and Financial Aid offices as well as 14 classrooms and testing center. Confluence is 87,000 sq.ft. and cost $38 million to build.

=== Cherry Creek, Boulder Creek, Clear Creek, and Bear Creek Buildings ===
The main classroom buildings in the CCD neighborhood of campus were renamed in 2013 to help differentiate them from the rest of campus. In addition to renaming them, CCD also gave them each a facelift.

== Central Auraria Campus ==
=== Arts Building ===
The Arts Building is the home for CU Denver's College of Arts and Media. The College of Arts and Media at CU Denver was the first college in Colorado devoted to arts and entertainment. Their record label, CAM Records originally signed bands such as The Fray and 303. The Arts Building also houses many of MSU Denver's art studios, music rooms, and theater related spaces. MSU Denver's Art Studios in the building include Painting, Printmaking, Jewelry Design and Metalsmithing, Ceramics, Drawing, and a state-of-the-art Foundations Suite. Both CU Denver and MSU Denver share a large scale Sculpture studio that allows students to work in a variety of medias including woods and metal, as well as a 6500 square foot photo lab. It is connected to the West Classroom and Central Classroom buildings via the second floor.

=== West Classroom ===
Most of MSU Denver's academic departments are housed in the West Classroom building, including Criminal Justice and Criminology, Health Care Management, Human Services, Health Professions, Nursing, and Teacher Education. It is connected to the Arts Building and the Central Classroom buildings via the second floor

=== Central Classroom ===
This building houses many of MSU Denver's academic departments and classrooms

=== PE/Event Center ===
This building includes a 5,000 square foot fitness center, climbing wall, basketball courts, dance studio, racquetball/squash courts, as well as other multipurpose activity spaces. MSU Denver's Roadrunner basketball team plays here. Classes in Zumba, salsa dancing, and other physical activities are held here. The building also houses intramural and club sports.

=== Kenneth King Academic & Performing Arts Center ===
The King Center houses six performing spaces: three permanently assigned production studios, a 200-seat Recital Hall; 520-seat Concert Hall; and a 200-seat Courtyard Theatre. There are dressing rooms, green room, recording studio, music electronics lab, classroom space, box office, scene shop, paint shop, and costume shop. All spaces are equipped for exhibiting art. The entire facility has over 180,000 square feet (17,000 m^{2}) dedicated to the education of the student and development of the student who wishes to go into the performance of the arts.

=== Auraria Library ===
Built in 1976, the library houses over one million volumes and makes available electronically many hundreds of thousands of additional titles. Auraria Library is the busiest academic library in the state of Colorado. Auraria Library is a member of the Colorado Alliance of Research Libraries. Also, the library is a federal depository library and has a sizable collection of government documents. The library's collection of Colorado state publications is also comprehensive.

=== Science Building ===
Located on Speer Boulevard between Arapahoe and Lawrence Streets, the new 195,000 square feet (18,100 m^{2}) Auraria Science Building and renovation of the existing 143,000 square feet (13,300 m^{2}) facility will allow for a 50-percent enrollment increase in chemistry, biology, and earth and atmospheric sciences. Chosen for Colorado's Art in Public Places program, the building's lobby features Psyche (the butterfly), a 14 1/2-by-10-foot sculpture by Donald Lipski. The Auraria Science Building opened in August 2010. The building received a Downtown Denver Award from the Downtown Denver Partnership in April 2010, for bridging a physical and perceptual gap between the Auraria Campus and downtown through inviting architecture and elevated educational opportunities.

=== Seventh Street Building ===
MSU Denver has an extensive aviation-related facility known as the "Seventh Street Building" (due to its location on Seventh Street). This facility contains the "World Indoor Airport", an extensive array of flight simulators designed to train students in single-, multi- and turboprop-engine aircraft flight.

== Historic sites ==
=== Emmanuel Gallery ===
Emmanuel is Denver's oldest church building, originally constructed in 1876 to serve an Episcopalian congregation. The tiny stone chapel is a mixture of Romanesque and Gothic architectural styles. Emmanuel was converted into a Jewish synagogue in 1903 and served as an artist's studio from 1958 until 1973. The building was approved for listing on the National Register of Historic Places in 1969 and currently serves Auraria as a shared art gallery for the three schools on campus.

=== Golda Meir House ===
The only remaining U.S. residence of former Israeli Prime Minister Golda Meir, a Denver landmark, serves as a museum, conference center, and the Metropolitan State University of Denver Golda Meir Center for Political Leadership.

=== Ninth Street Historic District ===
At the heart of the Auraria Campus, thirteen restored Victorian cottages and one turn-of-the century grocery store serve as a picturesque reminder of the city's earliest days. The structures on Ninth Street Historic Park, built between 1872 and 1906, constitute the oldest restored block of residences in the city. Ninth Street Historic District houses now serve as campus offices. A self-guided walking tour at each building provides information on architecture and early residents. There is no charge for visiting the Park.

=== St. Cajetan's ===
The Spanish Colonial St. Cajetan's Church, built in 1925, was one of three Catholic churches clustered within a six block radius in the Auraria neighborhood. St. Cajetan's served as the focus of Auraria's Spanish-speaking community until 1973, when construction of the Auraria Campus forced the parish to relocate. The landmark church now serves as a multi-purpose auditorium for lectures, concerts, recitals and other community events.

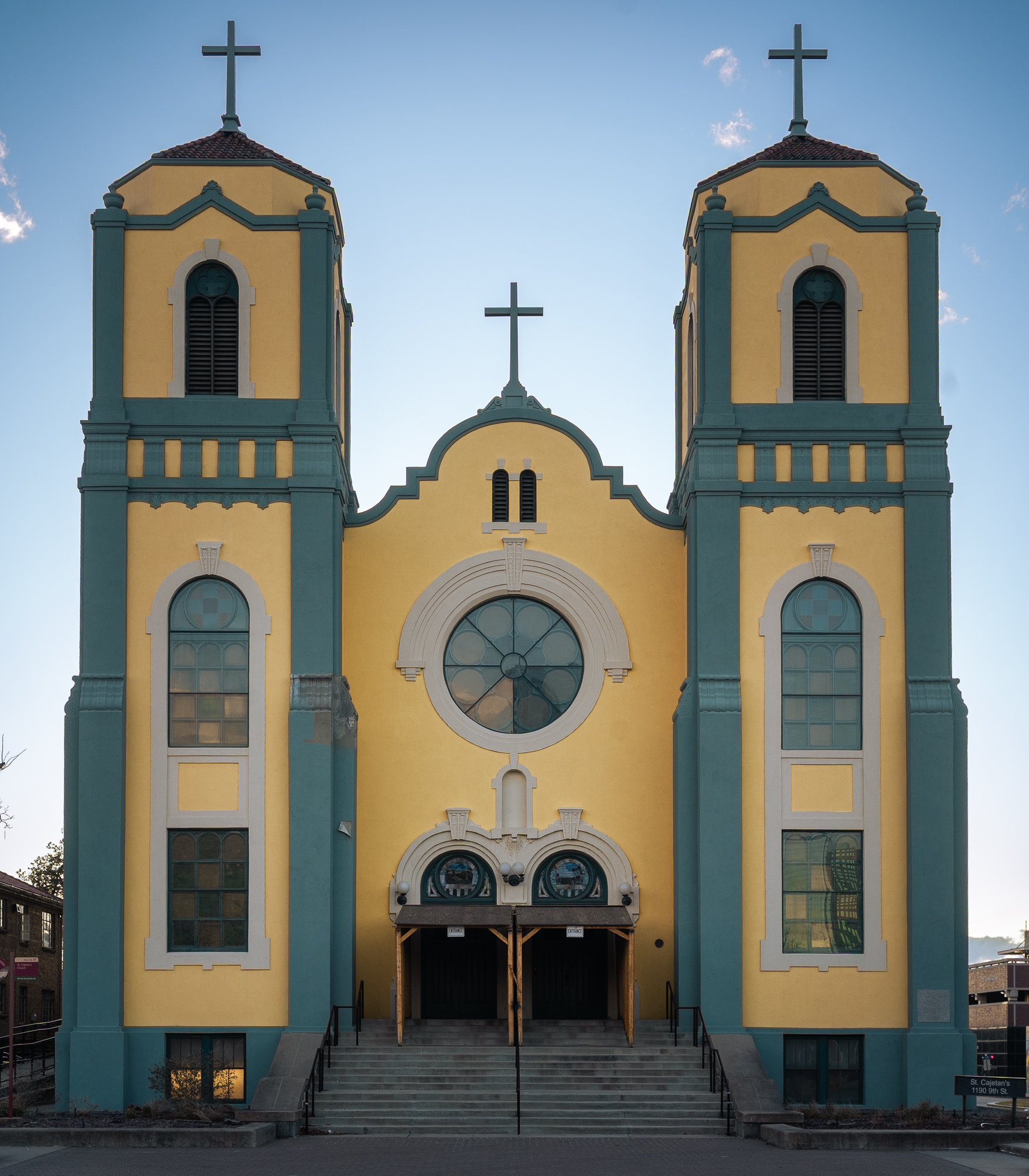
St Cajetan Catholic Church, December 2025

=== St. Elizabeth of Hungary Catholic Church ===
Founded in 1878 by German immigrants, St. Elizabeth's is still an active Catholic parish. The German-Gothic edifice, was modeled after the cathedrals of Europe. Built of rusticated rhyolite (lava rock) quarried at nearby Colorado Springs, the building has a 162' spire. St. Elizabeth's is considered one of Denver's most beautiful church structures.

=== Tivoli ===
One of Denver's earliest breweries, the Tivoli is a striking architectural example of the city's flamboyant past. Originally named the Colorado Brewery in 1866, Tivoli was founded by German immigrant Moritz Sigi. Subsequent owner Max Melsheimer added the prominent seven story mansard tower and the Turnhalle opera house. In 1901 brewer John Good took over operations, renaming the building Tivoli after the famous gardens in Copenhagen, Denmark. The Tivoli was one of the most successful breweries in the Rockies, and one of the few to survive prohibition. A major flood and labor strikes forced its closure in 1969. When the Auraria Campus was built, a private developer leased the building and restored it as a specialty shopping center. In 1991, students voted to buy back the lease and renovate the building as a combination retail center and student union.

== Public transportation ==
- Auraria West Campus (RTD) - Light rail station for the E & W lines
- Colfax at Auraria (RTD) - Light rail station for the D & H lines
- RTD Bus Routes - 1, 6, 15L, 16, 20, 43

== Notable visitors ==
=== Denver Film Festival ===
- Kerry Bishé
- Danny Boyle
- Aaron Eckhart
- Elliott Gould
- Richard Jenkins
- Allan King
- George Kuchar
- Philip Baker Hall
- Ed Harris
- Ryūichi Hiroki
- Hal Holbrook
- Ang Lee
- Claude Lelouch
- Anthony Minghella
- Tim Robbins
- J. K. Simmons
- P. Adams Sitney
- Scott Wilson
- Vilmos Zsigmond

=== Entertainment ===
- Michael Eric Dyson
- Pam Grier
- David Horowitz
- Michael Moore
- Cleo Parker Robinson
- Joseph Simmons
- Ruth Westheimer

=== Politics ===
- Michael Bennet
- George H. W. Bush
- Terrance Carroll
- Shirley Chisholm
- Hillary Clinton
- John Edwards
- Alberto Gonzales
- Michael Hancock (CU Denver Alumnus)
- Gary Hart
- Dick Lamm
- Barack Obama
- Daniel Ortega
- Bill Owens
- Rand Paul
- Bill Ritter
- Andrew Romanoff
- Bernie Sanders
- Joseph Sebarenzi
- Elizabeth Warren
- Wellington Webb
- Cornel West

== See also ==
- Metropolitan State University of Denver
- University of Colorado Denver
- Community College of Denver
- Tivoli Brewery Company (building)
