= Regency Student Housing =

Student housing community in Denver, Colorado

Coordinates: 39°46′17″N 104°59′34″W

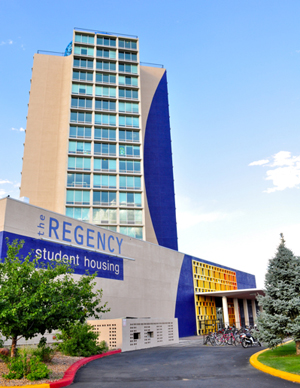
The Regency Student Housing building

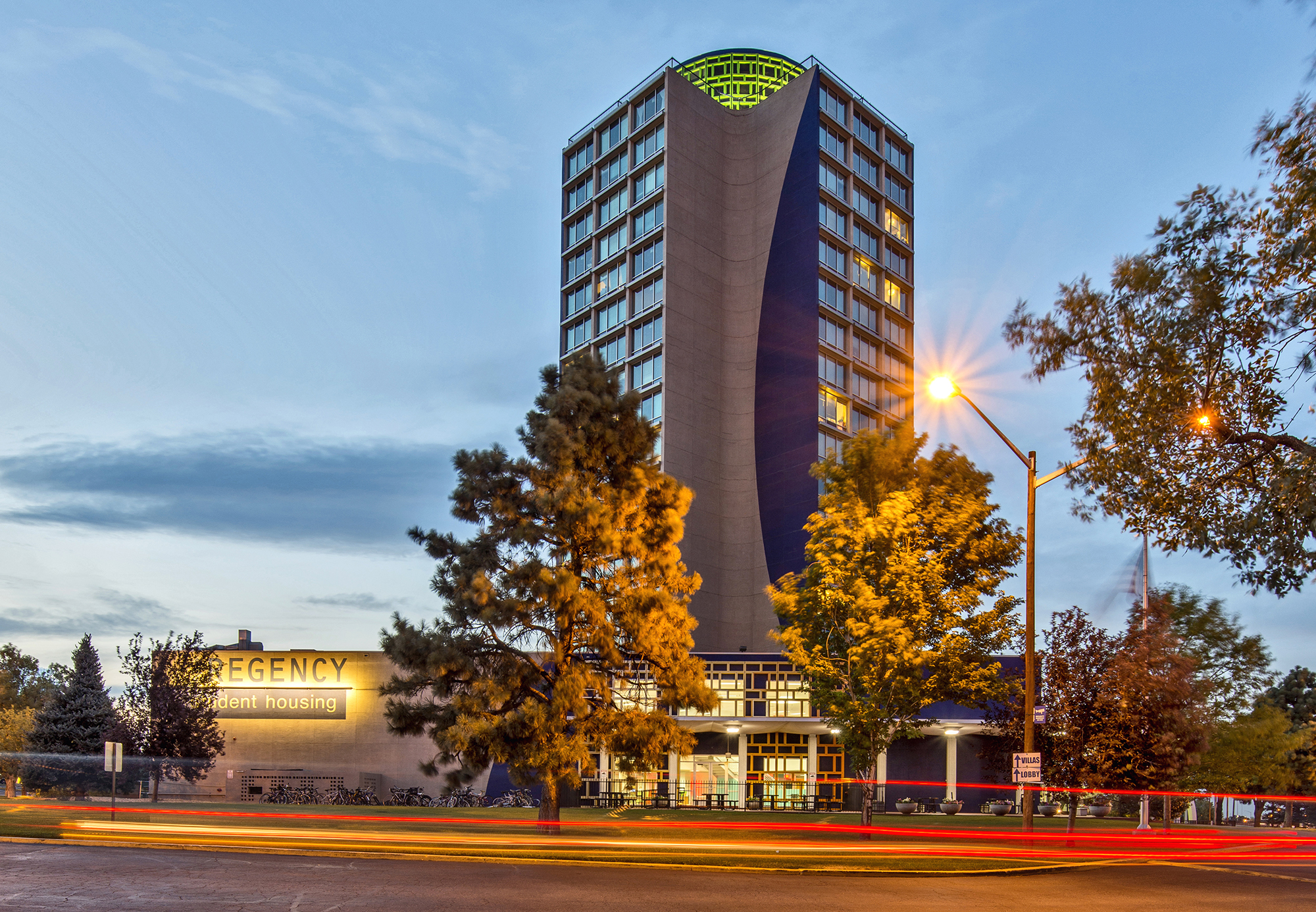
The Regency Student Housing, Denver Colorado

Regency Student Housing is one of three student-housing communities for the Auraria Campus in downtown Denver, Colorado. Formerly the Regency Hotel, the building is privately owned by local investor and proprietor V. Robert (Rob) Salazar, who bought the building in 2004, and serves three schools: Community College of Denver (CCD), Metropolitan State University of Denver (MSU Denver), and the University of Colorado Denver (CU Denver).

Located at 3900 Elati Street, two miles from the Auraria Campus off Interstate 25 and Park Avenue West, The Regency is Auraria's first student housing community; the others are the Campus Village Apartments and the Inn at Auraria.

== History ==
The Regency Hotel was built by real-estate developers Marvin and Victor Lederman, and designed by Richard DeGette, with construction starting in 1968. It was designed to serve as a regional convention center, with banquet and meeting rooms, exhibit areas for car dealers, four restaurants, three bars, a disco, an indoor and an outdoor swimming pool, and tennis courts, and was known for its large gold dome, the Piccadilly Rotunda. The convention center had an authorized capacity of 4,350. In the early and mid-1970s the hotel flourished; Elvis Presley stayed in the penthouse several times, and the hotel was said to keep a piano there for him.

The hotel subsequently became neglected. Art Cormier, known in Denver for owning what he said was the world's largest laundromat, operated a popular nightclub called Los Caporales there from April 1998 and in May 1999 bought the property with the intention of renovating it. In February 2002 a fire that was determined to be arson damaged 60 rooms and seriously injured one person. In January 2003 Cormier announced his intention to sell the hotel at auction. In April 2003 the city closed some of the entertainment areas for safety violations, and in April 2004 a judge closed the entire hotel as unsafe, requiring those living there to leave by the end of the next day.

Salazar's Regency Realty Investors LLC (now Central Street Capital) bought the hotel for $6.4 million in 2004, at which time it had 410 rooms. Architectural Workshop designed the conversion into student housing, for which they won the 2005 silver Colorado Hard Hat Award for renovation/restoration and an Honorable Mention for Renovation Design in the 2006 Colorado ASID Awards. There was a fire in the rotunda in June 2005.

The Regency Student Housing Community opened in fall 2005 with 300 beds and added another 400 within a year. A new building with 360 beds in 120 units, The Villas at Regency, was added in 2012–13. The Regency is open to both undergraduates and graduate students of the Auraria Campus institutions and is administered by Auraria Student Housing at the Regency. In 2015 ASH won a lawsuit against Campus Village Apartments over the University of Colorado Denver's requirement that freshmen and new international students live at Campus Village, which is owned by a different private operator.
