= Auraria 9th Street Historic District =

Historic district in Colorado, United States

- U.S. National Register of Historic Places
- U.S. Historic district
- Colorado State Register of Historic Properties
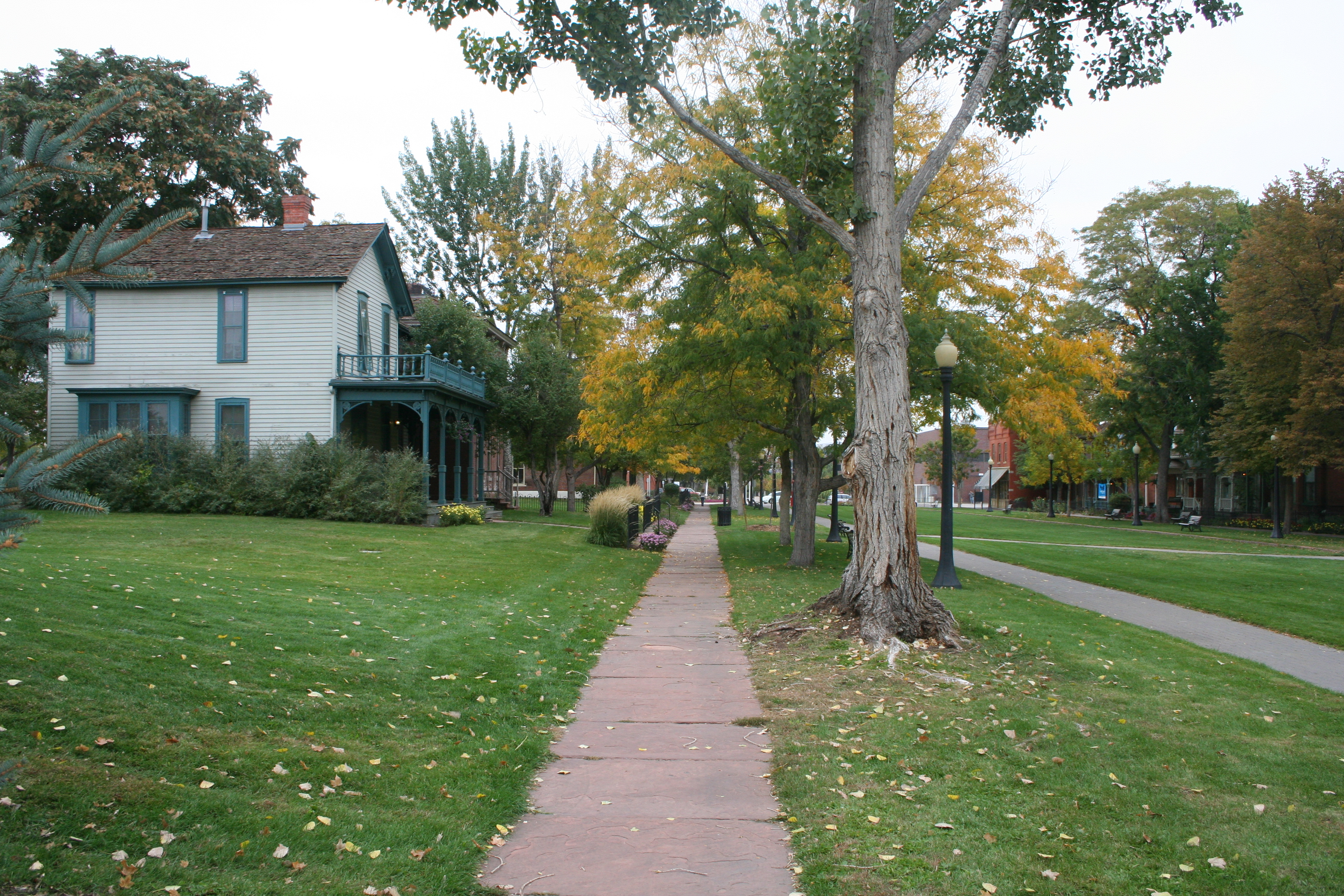
- The 9th Street Historic District is located on the Auraria Campus in Denver, Colorado. The grassy area on the right used to be paved and was 9th Street.

- Location within Colorado
- Location: 9th St. from Curtis to Champa St., Denver, Colorado
- Coordinates: 39°44′30″N 105°00′12″W
- Area: 3.5 acres (1.4 ha)
- Built: 1873
- Architectural style: Late Victorian
- NRHP reference No.: 73000466
- CSRHP No.: 5DV.102
- Added to NRHP: March 26, 1973

Auraria 9th Street Historic District is a historic district in Denver, Colorado at Auraria Campus. It includes both sides of one block of 9th Street, from Curtis St. to Champa St. The listing included 33 contributing buildings. The district was listed on the National Register of Historic Places in 1973.

The block was developed with mainly Victorian-style, modest homes during 1873 to 1905.

The street has been removed and replaced with a greenway.

== See also ==
- Metropolitan State University of Denver
  - Auraria Campus
