= St. Elizabeth's Church (Denver, Colorado) =

Historic church in Colorado, United States

- U.S. National Register of Historic Places
- Colorado State Register of Historic Properties
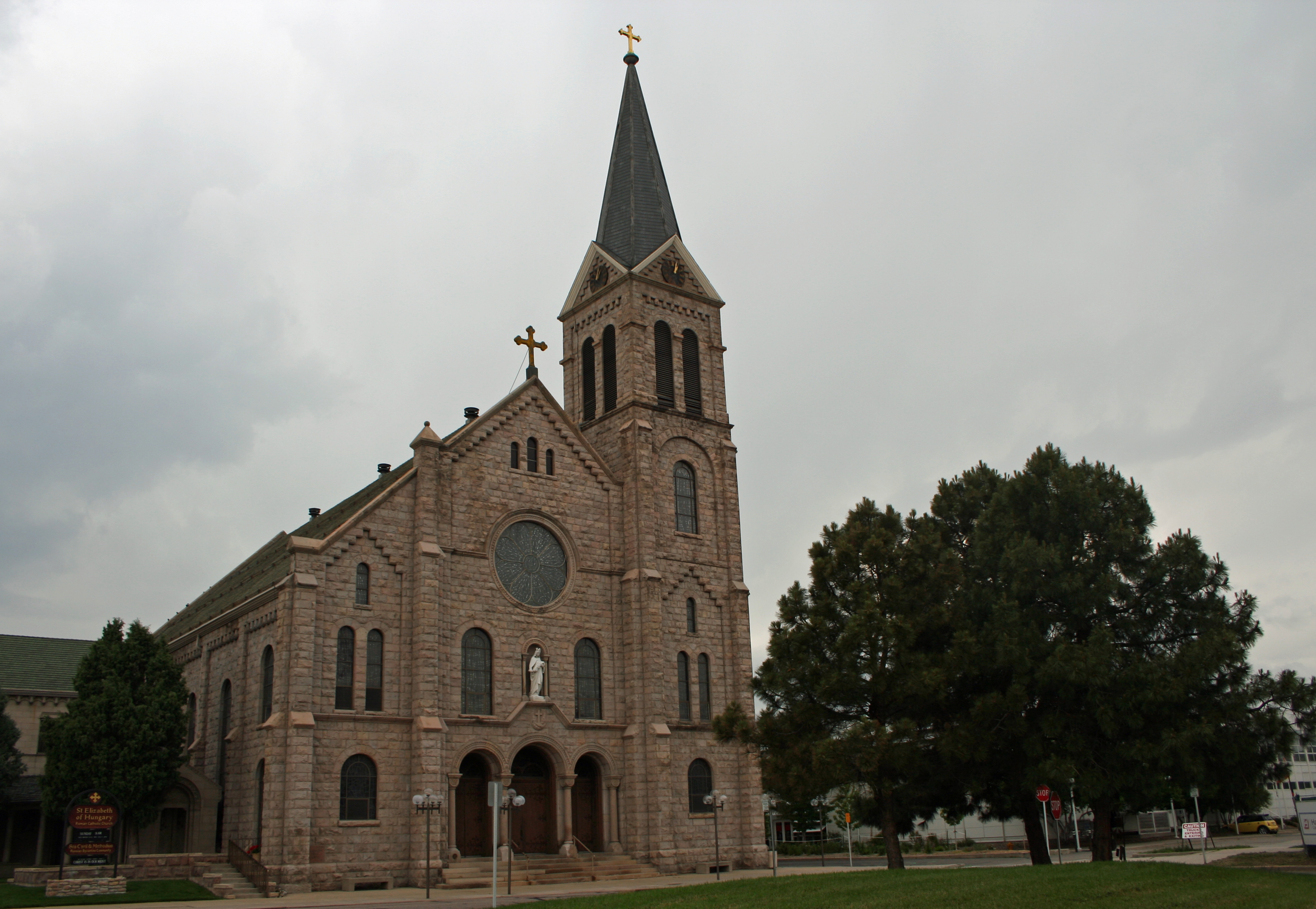

- Location within Colorado Location within the United States
- Location: 1062 11th St., Denver, Colorado
- Coordinates: 39°44′34″N 105°0′6″W
- Area: 0.7 acres (0.28 ha)
- Built: 1898
- Architectural style: German Gothic
- NRHP reference No.: 69000043
- CSRHP No.: 5DV.128
- Added to NRHP: December 1, 1969

St. Elizabeth's Church is a historic church in Denver, Colorado, United States. It was built in 1898 and was added to the National Register of Historic Places in 1969.

The church was founded in 1878 by and for German-speaking Catholic families in Denver. St. Elizabeth's Church is a historic Roman Catholic church in Denver, Colorado, United States. Built in 1898, it was added to the National Register of Historic Places in 1969. The parish was founded in 1878 to serve Denver's German-speaking Catholic population.

== History ==
In 1870, Denver's German Catholic community petitioned Bishop Joseph Projectus Machebeuf for a German-speaking priest. In response, St. Elizabeth of Hungary Parish was established in 1878 as Denver's second Catholic parish. The parish served the Auraria neighborhood and southwest Denver and functioned as the city's German national parish.

In 1887, Franciscan friars Francis Koch, O.F.M., and Venatius Eder, O.F.M., arrived from Paterson, New Jersey, at the request of Bishop Machebeuf and established a Franciscan house at the parish. Under Koch's leadership, a two-story brick school was built in 1890, followed by a rectory in 1891.

The growth of the congregation led to the replacement of the original church building. The present church was completed in 1898. Constructed of rusticated rhyolite quarried near Castle Rock, Colorado, the building was designed in a Romanesque style. As the parish successfully retired its debt, it became the first church in the Diocese of Denver to do so and was consecrated by Bishop Nicholas Chrysostom Matz on June 8, 1902.

The parish developed a long tradition of charitable work under Franciscan leadership. During the pastorate of Father Leo Heinrichs, O.F.M., who arrived in 1907, the parish became known for serving Denver's poor. This ministry continued throughout the twentieth century.

A friary was constructed adjacent to the church in 1936 through funding provided by the May Bonfils Trust. Designed by architect Jacques Benedict, the building includes a colonnade, Stations of the Cross, and a shrine dedicated to Saint Francis of Assisi.

Following the reforms of the Second Vatican Council, the church interior underwent a major renovation in 1968. The stained-glass windows currently in the church were installed during this renovation.

In the 1970s, the Auraria Urban Renewal Project transformed the surrounding neighborhood and resulted in the demolition of much of Auraria. Preservation efforts led to St. Elizabeth's being protected as a historic landmark. Following the creation of the Auraria Higher Education Center campus, the church became known as the campus chapel.

The Franciscan friars administered the parish until 1983. The Capuchins subsequently cared for the parish until 1992. Between 1992 and 2003, pastoral administration was provided at various times by the Archdiocese of Denver, the Vincentians, and the Oblates of the Virgin Mary.

In 2003, St. Elizabeth of Hungary became home to both Roman Catholic and Russian Byzantine Catholic communities. The parish was notable for serving two Catholic liturgical traditions within a single parish structure. In June 2016, the Russian Byzantine Catholic community was relocated by the Archdiocese of Denver, and St. Elizabeth's was designated a mission of the Cathedral Basilica of the Immaculate Conception.

== Architecture ==
Completed in 1898, the church features a prominent spire rising 162 feet (49 m) above the surrounding neighborhood. The structure is constructed of rusticated rhyolite and is one of Denver's best-known historic Catholic churches.

It has a spire which rises to 162 feet (49 m).
