= Auraria Library =

Academic library in Denver, Colorado

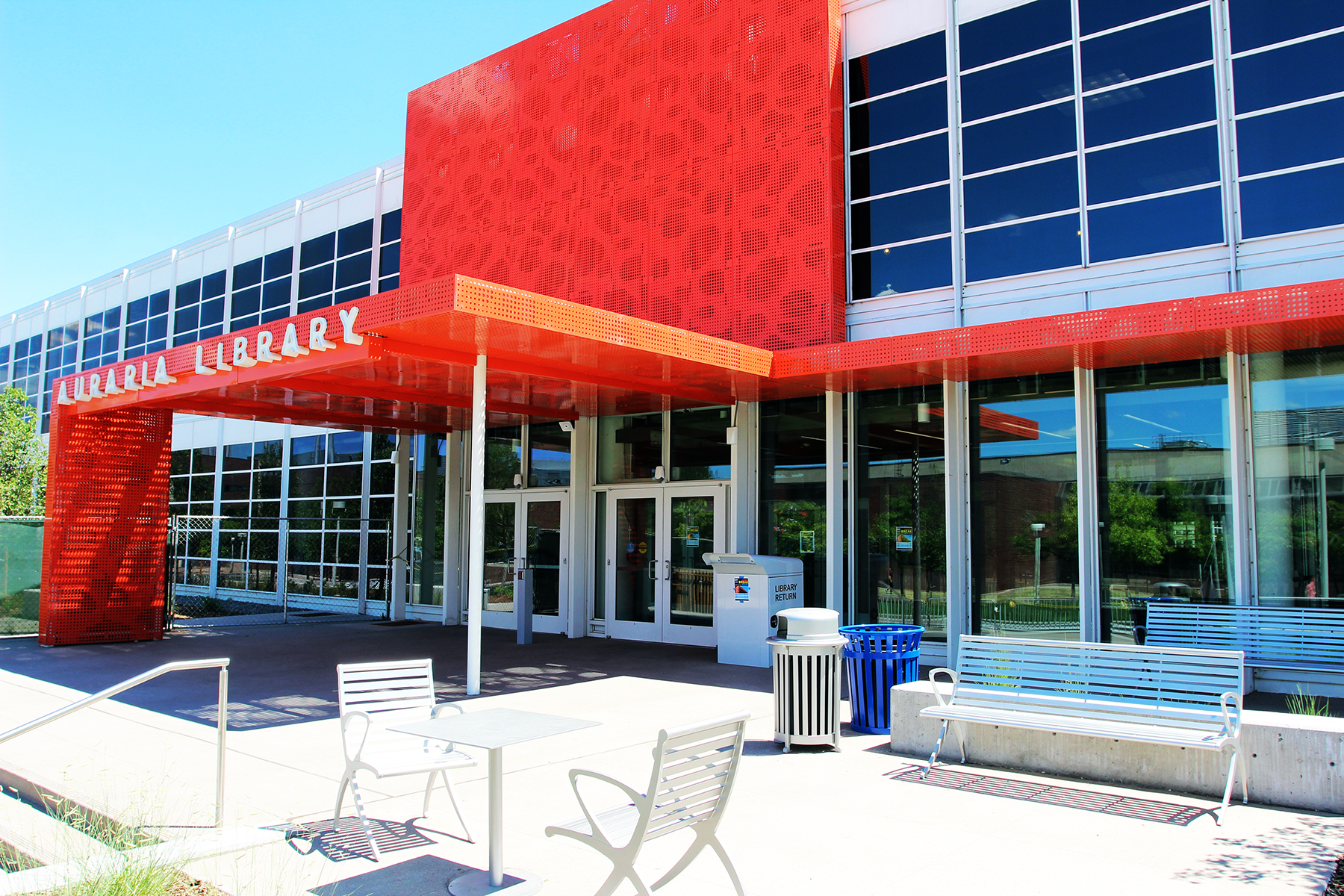
- The Lawrence Street entrance to Auraria Library
- 39.7434°N 105.0029°W
- Location: Denver, Colorado, United States
- Type: Academic
- Established: 1976

Collection
- Items collected: All formats
- Size: About 790,000 print and electronic books; about 87,000 electronic journal subscriptions

Access and use
- Population served: The library serves the 45,000 students on the Auraria Campus.

Other information
- Director: Jodi Shepherd
- Employees: 55
- Website: https://library.auraria.edu

Auraria Library is an academic library in downtown Denver, Colorado. It provides academic resources and research experiences to students, staff, and faculty at the University of Colorado Denver (CU Denver), the Metropolitan State University of Denver (MSU Denver), and the Community College of Denver (CCD) on the Auraria Higher Education Center (AHEC) campus, also called the Auraria Campus. The Library is administratively operated by CU Denver and occupies a building owned by the State of Colorado.

The Auraria Library is the largest tri-institutional college library in the world, serving more than 43,000 students, faculty, and staff from three institutions: Community College of Denver (CCD), Metropolitan State University of Denver (MSU Denver), and the University of Colorado Denver (CU Denver). The campus reflects the diversity of Colorado higher education—MSU Denver and CCD are federally designated Hispanic-Serving Institutions, and CU Denver is designated as an Asian American and Native American Pacific Islander-Serving Institution. Hispanic/Latina/o/x students comprise 44% of CCD’s student body and 36% of MSU Denver’s, while Asian/Pacific Islander students make up 13% of CU Denver’s enrollment. Graduates from these institutions play a key role in the Denver metropolitan area’s economic and civic life, with many choosing to remain in the region to live and work.

The library is known for its association with Beall's List, created by its former faculty member Jeffrey Beall and used by universities and libraries worldwide.

== Building ==
Auraria Library's $32.8 million renovation project came to a close in 2017. "The reconfigured and upgraded library, whose Lawrence Way entrance faces west under a colorful cayenne canopy, is now bright, roomy, innovative, study-friendly, artsy and still flexible enough to meet the changing needs of 21st century college students."

The building was originally designed by internationally recognized architect Helmut Jahn. Its design excellence was recognized by the Chicago chapter of the American Institute of Architects (AIA) in 1978. In 2009, it earned the Denver AIA 25-year Award, which recognizes the enduring quality of architectural design that has withstood the “test of time” and still functions in its original capacity.

== Renovation ==
Auraria Library's $32.8 million renovation project was funded by $26.8 million in state funds and $6 million in cash contributions including donations. The renovation was broken down into five phases:

- 2012-2011: Creating Community
- 2012: Transforming Learning Spaces
- 2013: Discovering Possibilities
- 2014: Exploring Library as Place
- 2015-2016: Innovating Dreams

The renovation created more collaborative space, improved technology and added many student-friendly amenities.

== Collections ==
The Library collection includes approximately 574,000 print books, 326,000 eBooks, 93,000 online journals, 99,000 streaming videos, and over 300 databases through its Summon Discovery service.

The Auraria Library receives money from the three schools on Auraria Campus – CU Denver, MSU Denver, and CCD. Each school's contribution is based on the number of full-time equivalent (FTE) students enrolled at the school. For the Fiscal Year (FY) 2024, Auraria Library had $3.3 million to spend on collections. This covers all databases, journals, news sources, books, streaming media, DVDs, and other resources the library purchases or subscribes. Over 80% of the $3.3 million goes towards journal and database subscriptions.

== Notable faculty ==
- Jeffrey Beall, founder of Beall's list
